= Naranjales =

Naranjales may refer to:

== Places ==
- Naranjales, Las Marías, Puerto Rico, a barrio
- Naranjales, Mayagüez, Puerto Rico, a barrio
