= Juan Alonso =

Juan Alonso may refer to:

- Juan Alonso (footballer, born 1927) (1927–1994), Spanish footballer
- Juan Alonso (footballer, born 1998), Mexican footballer
- Juan Alonso, Mayagüez, Puerto Rico, a barrio in the municipality of Mayagüez, Puerto Rico

== See also ==
- Juan Alonzo (1911–?), Cuban footballer.
