= Río Hondo, Mayagüez, Puerto Rico =

Barrio of Puerto Rico

Río Hondo
- Barrio
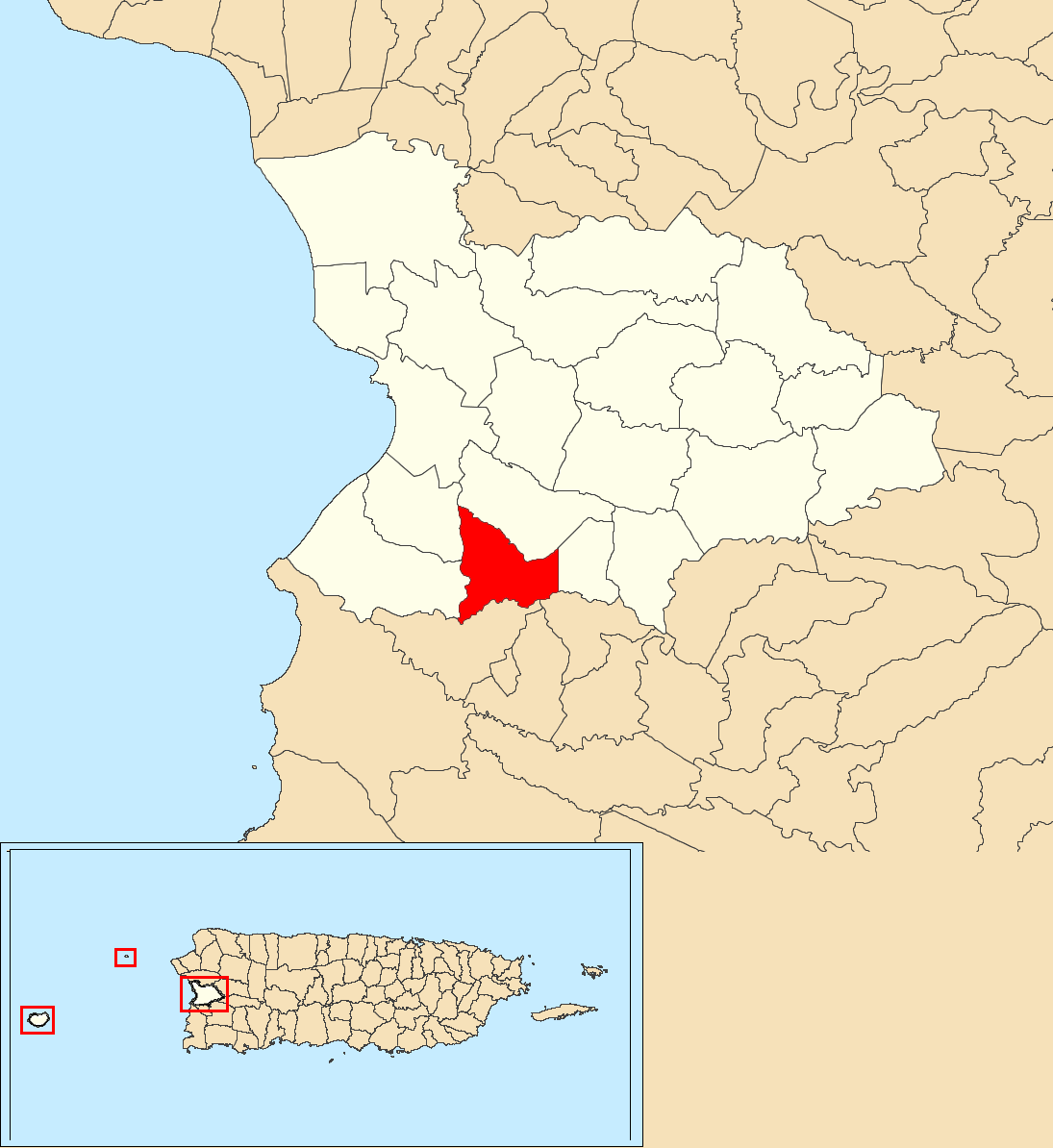
- Location of Río Hondo within the municipality of Mayagüez shown in red

- Location of Puerto Rico
- Coordinates: 18°09′56″N 67°07′38″W
- Commonwealth: Puerto Rico
- Municipality: Mayagüez

Area
  - Total: 1.72 sq mi (4.5 km^{2})
  - Land: 1.72 sq mi (4.5 km^{2})
  - Water: 0 sq mi (0 km^{2})
- Elevation: 92 ft (28 m)

Population (2010)
  - Total: 3,640
  - Density: 2,116.3/sq mi (817.1/km^{2})
- Source: 2010 Census
- Time zone: UTC−4 (AST)

Río Hondo is a barrio in the municipality of Mayagüez, Puerto Rico. Its population in 2010 was 3,640.

== History ==
Río Hondo was in Spain's gazetteers until Puerto Rico was ceded by Spain in the aftermath of the Spanish–American War under the terms of the Treaty of Paris of 1898 and became an unincorporated territory of the United States. In 1899, the United States Department of War conducted a census of Puerto Rico finding that the combined population of Río Hondo barrio and Malezas barrio was 1,072.

Historical population
Census	Pop.	Note	%±
1910	725		—
1920	729		0.6%
1930	844		15.8%
1940	948		12.3%
1950	731		−22.9%
1960	796		8.9%
1970	929		16.7%
1980	2,630		183.1%
1990	3,365		27.9%
2000	3,865		14.9%
2010	3,640		−5.8%
U.S. Decennial Census; 1900 (N/A) 1910-1930; 1930-1950 1980-2000 2010

== Features ==
In 2018, over 65 acres of forest land in Río Hondo barrio were acquired by The Autonomous Municipality of Mayagüez in Puerto Rico, in partnership with a local, non-profit conservation group. The preservation of the Río Hondo Community Forest (Bosque Comunitario Río Hondo) is managed by the Proyecto Agro Eco Turístico del Barrio Rio Hondo Inc.

== See also ==
- List of communities in Puerto Rico
