= Mayagüez, Puerto Rico =

City and municipality in Puerto Rico

Mayagüez Municipio Autónomo de Mayagüez Pueblo de Nuestra Señora de la Candelaria de Mayagüez
- Municipality
- Autonomous Municipality of Mayaguez
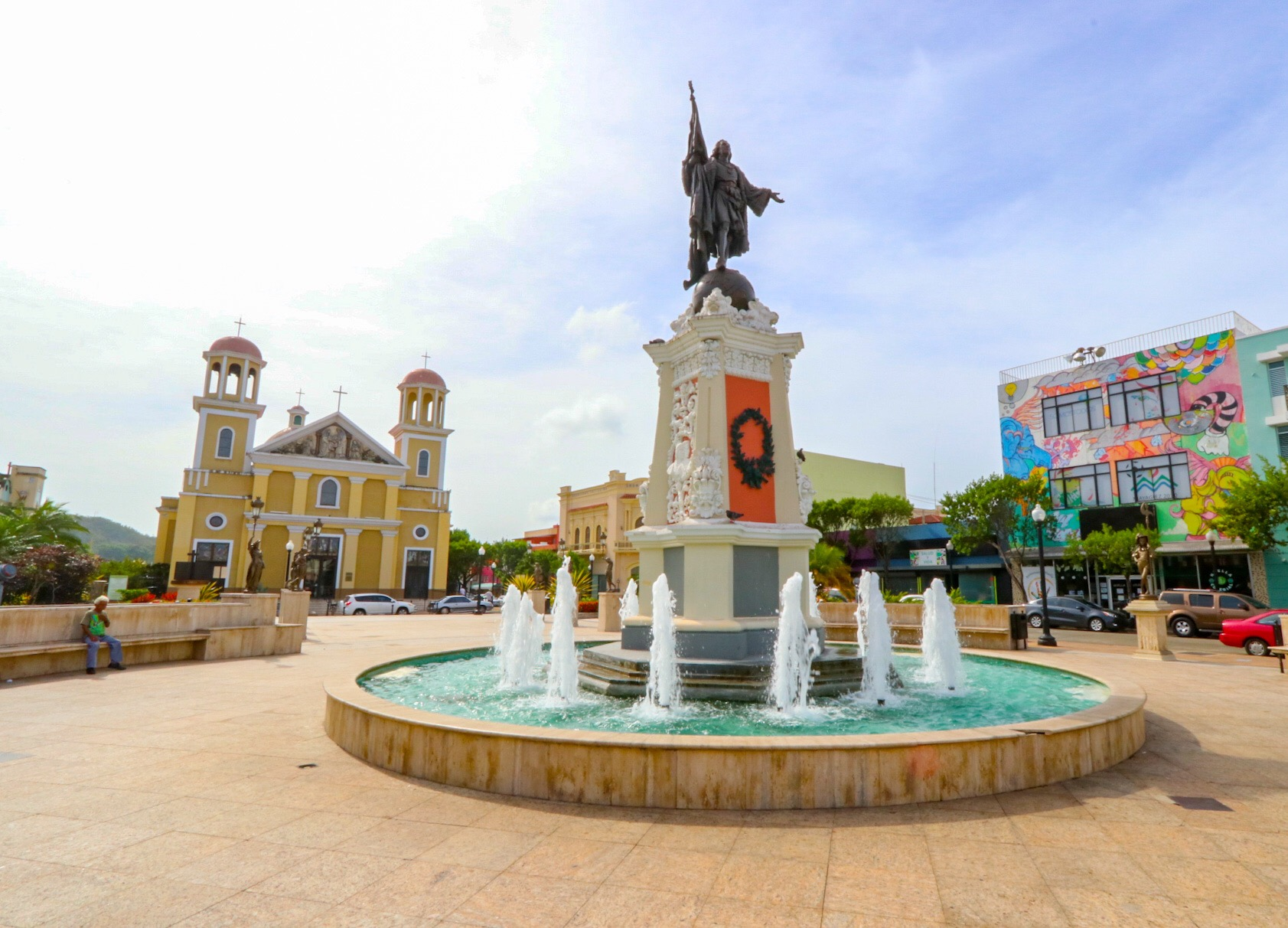
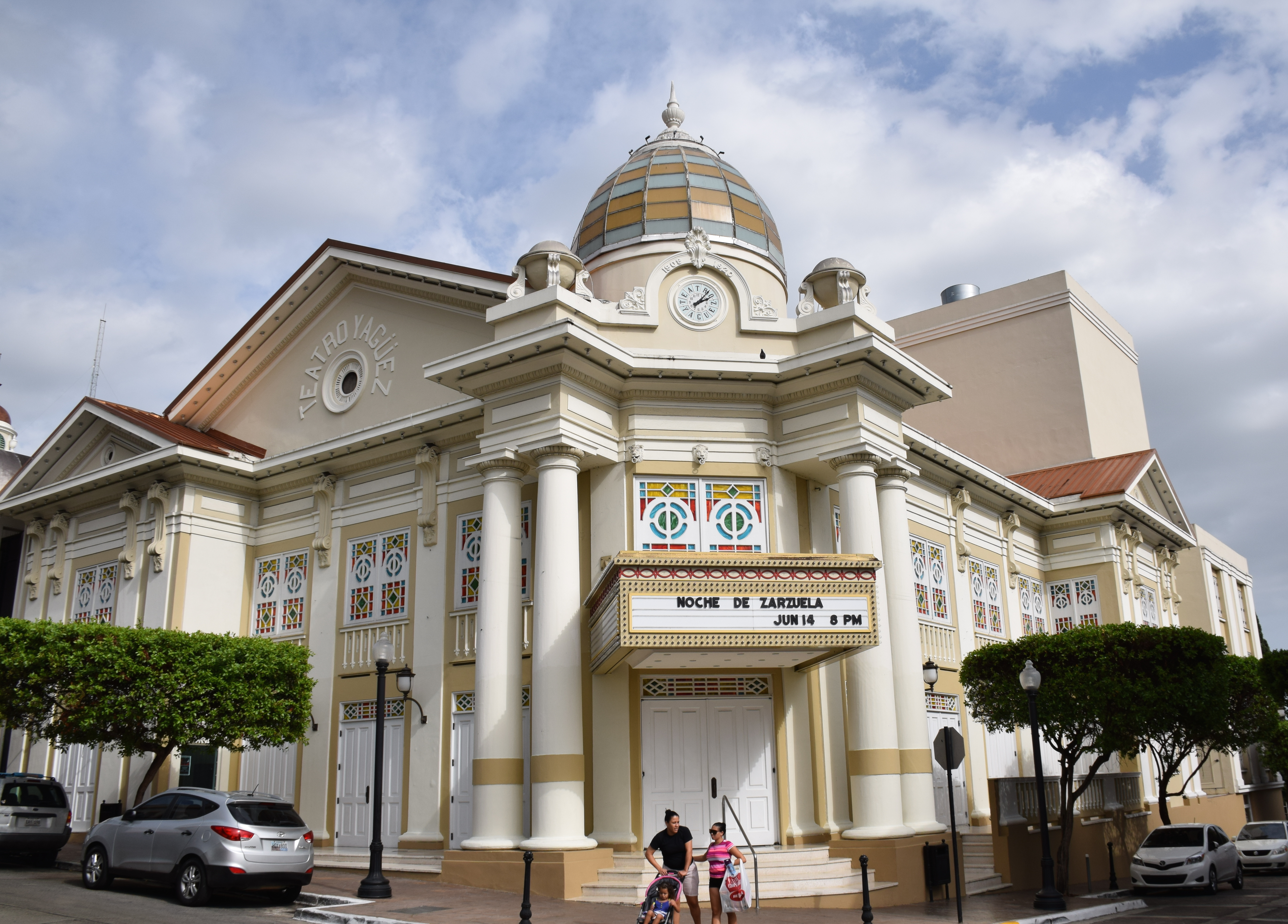
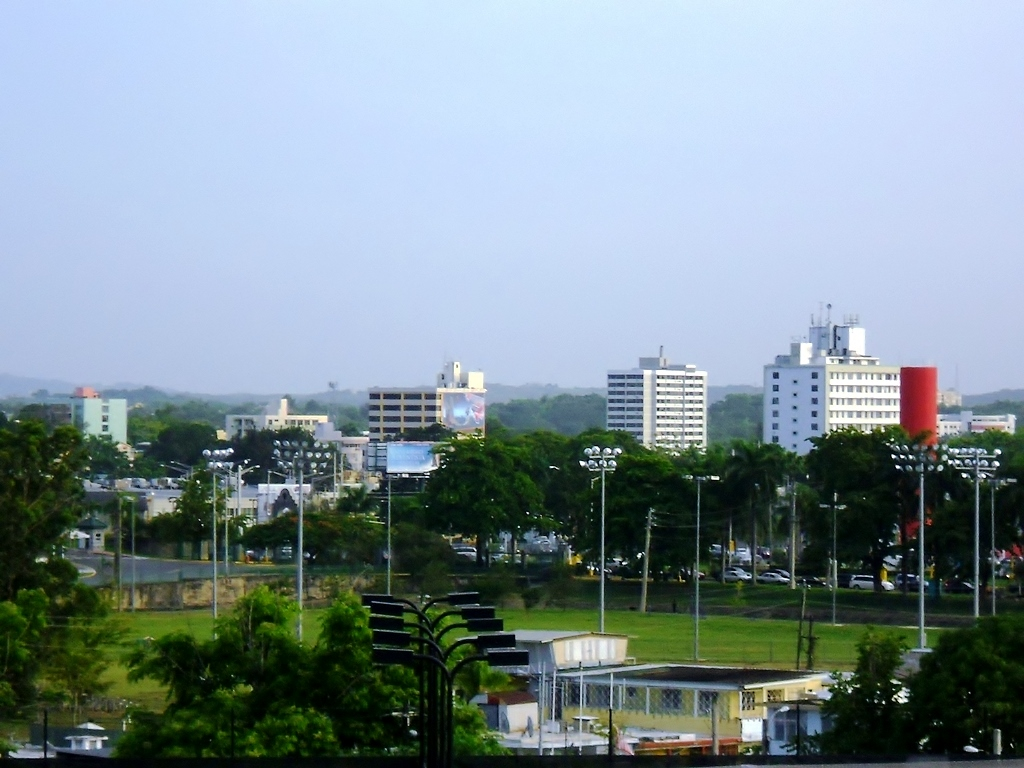
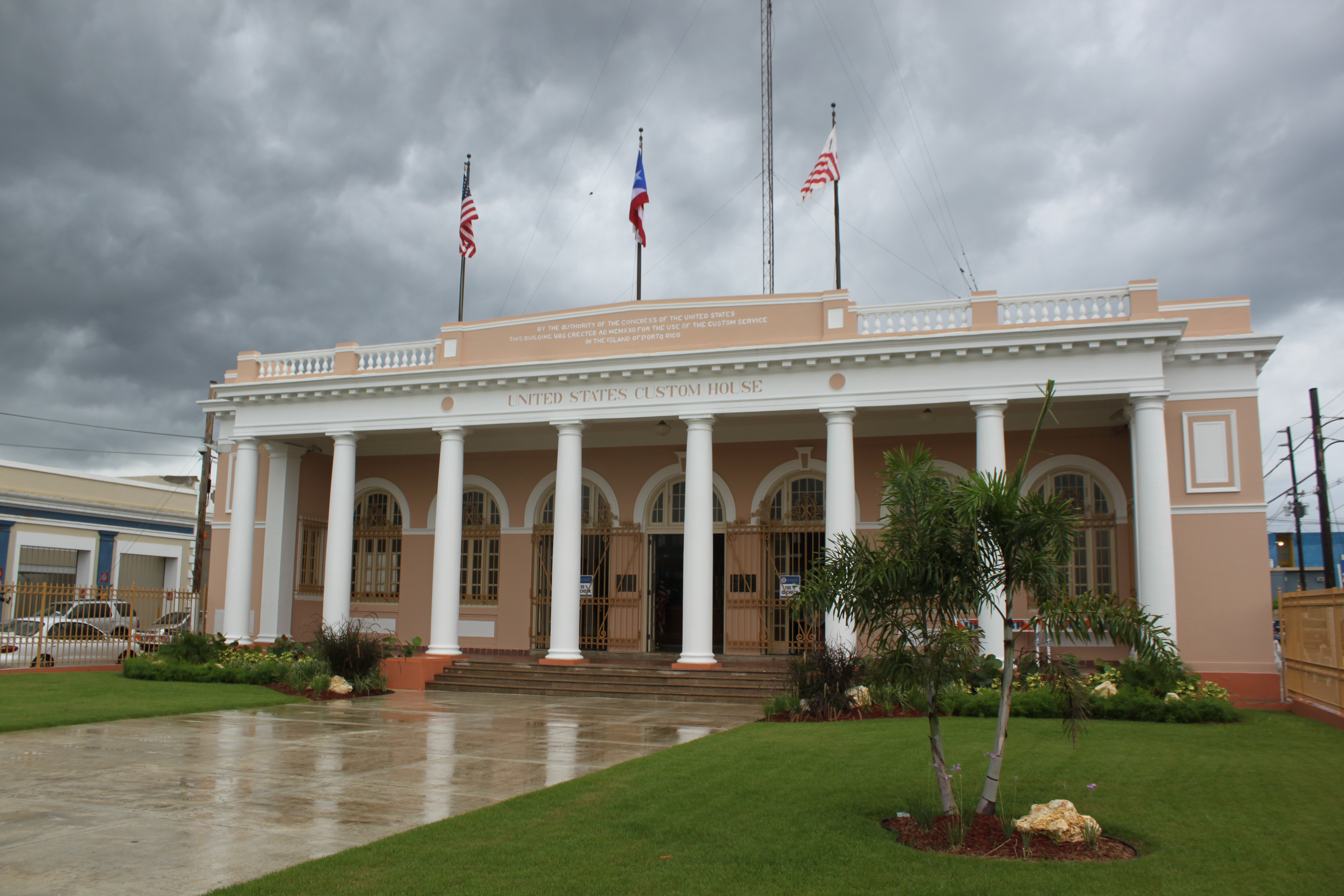
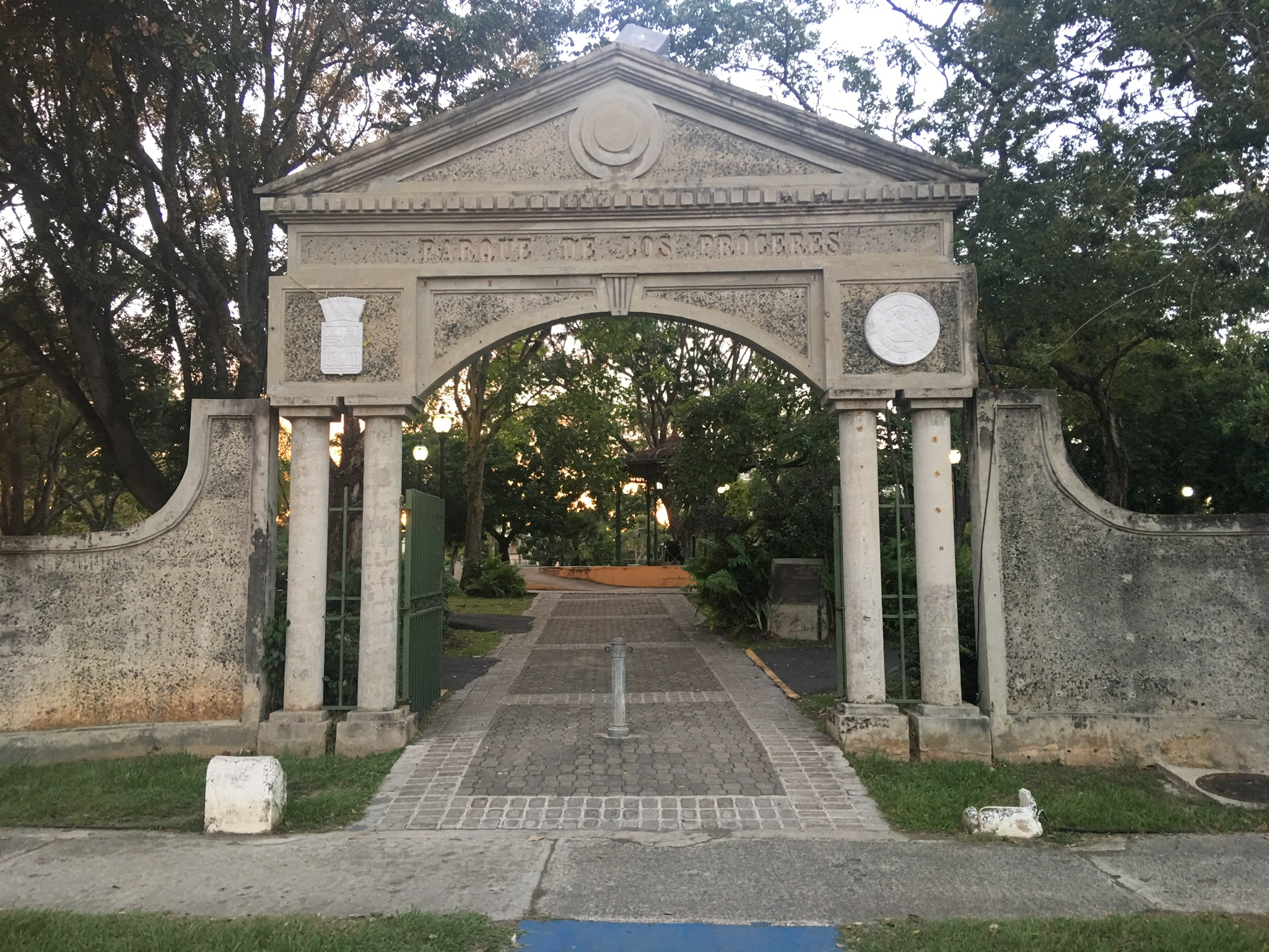
- From top, left to right: Plaza Colón Square and cathedral; Yagüez Theater; downtown Mayagüez; Old US Custom House; entrance portico to Próceres Park

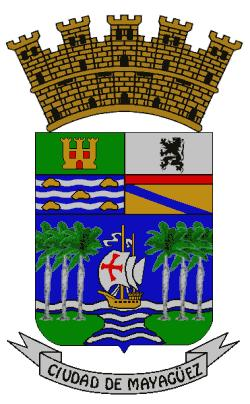
- Flag Coat of arms
- Nicknames: "La Sultana del Oeste", "La Ciudad de las Aguas Puras", "El Pueblo del Mangó"
- Motto: Nuevo Mundo dio Colon a Castilla y Leon
- Anthem: "Mi patria es un oasis"
- Map of Puerto Rico highlighting Mayagüez Municipality
- Coordinates: 18°12′04″N 67°08′23″W
- Sovereign state: United States
- Commonwealth: Puerto Rico
- Founded: September 18, 1760
- Founder: Faustino Martínez de Matos; Juan de Silva; Juan de Aponte
- Named for: Originally Virgin of Candelaria then local indigenous name variant.
- Seat: Casa Alcaldia de Mayaguez
- Barrios: 21 barrios: Algarrobos; Bateyes; Guanajibo; Isla de Mona e Islote Monito; Juan Alonso; Leguísamo; Limón; Malezas; Mayagüez Arriba; Mayagüez barrio-pueblo; Miradero; Montoso; Naranjales; Quebrada Grande; Quemado; Río Cañas Abajo; Río Cañas Arriba; Río Hondo; Rosario; Sábalos; Sabanetas

Government
  - Type: Mayor-council government
  - Mayor: Jorge Ramos Ruiz (PPD)
  - Senatorial dist.: Mayagüez
  - Representative dist.: 18 and 19

Area
  - Municipality: 274.09 sq mi (709.89 km^{2})
  - Land: 77.63 sq mi (201.07 km^{2})
  - Water: 196.46 sq mi (508.82 km^{2})
- Highest elevation: 1,577 ft (480.6 m)
- Lowest elevation: 0 ft (0 m)

Population (2020)
  - Municipality: 73,077
  - Estimate (2025): 68,905 ▼
  - Rank: 9th in Puerto Rico
  - Density: 941.31/sq mi (363.44/km^{2})
  - Metro: 97,605 (MSA)
  - CSA: 222,705
- Demonym: Mayagüezanos
- Time zone: UTC−4 (AST)
- ZIP Codes: 00680, 00681, 00682
- Area code: 787/939
- FIPS code: 72-52431
- GNIS feature ID: 1611495

Mayagüez (Spanish pronunciation: [maʝaˈɣwes], locally [maʝaˈweʔ]) is the ninth-largest municipality in Puerto Rico. It was founded as Pueblo de Nuestra Señora de la Candelaria de Mayagüez (Township of Our Lady of Candelaria), and is also known as La Sultana del Oeste (The Sultaness of the West), Ciudad de las Aguas Puras (City of Pure Waters), or Ciudad del Mangó (Mango City). On April 6, 1894, the Spanish Crown granted it the formal title of Excelente Ciudad de Mayagüez (Excellent City of Mayagüez). Mayagüez is located in the center of the western coast on the island of Puerto Rico. It has a population of 73,077, and it is the principal city of the Mayagüez Metropolitan Statistical Area (pop. 213,831) and the Mayagüez–Aguadilla, PR Combined Statistical Area (pop. 467,599).

== History ==
The Mayagüez Metro Area (and part of Añasco) lies today on two former Taíno Cacicazgos (chiefdoms): Yaguex and Yagüeca, a region noted for its record of colonial resistance (i.e., Urayoán and Legend of Diego Salcedo). The Tainos constituted the majority of the island's inhabitants at the time of contact with Europeans in 1493 and called it Boriquen or Borinquen. Today, this appellation and its variations continue to designate the Island of Puerto Rico and its people. The Taínos came from South American branches of Arawakan speakers, more specifically from modern-day Venezuela, and lived in small villages, organized their society in clans and named their chiefs Cacique. They were farmers who domesticated crops as pineapples, cassava, and sweet potatoes supplemented by fish and seafood.

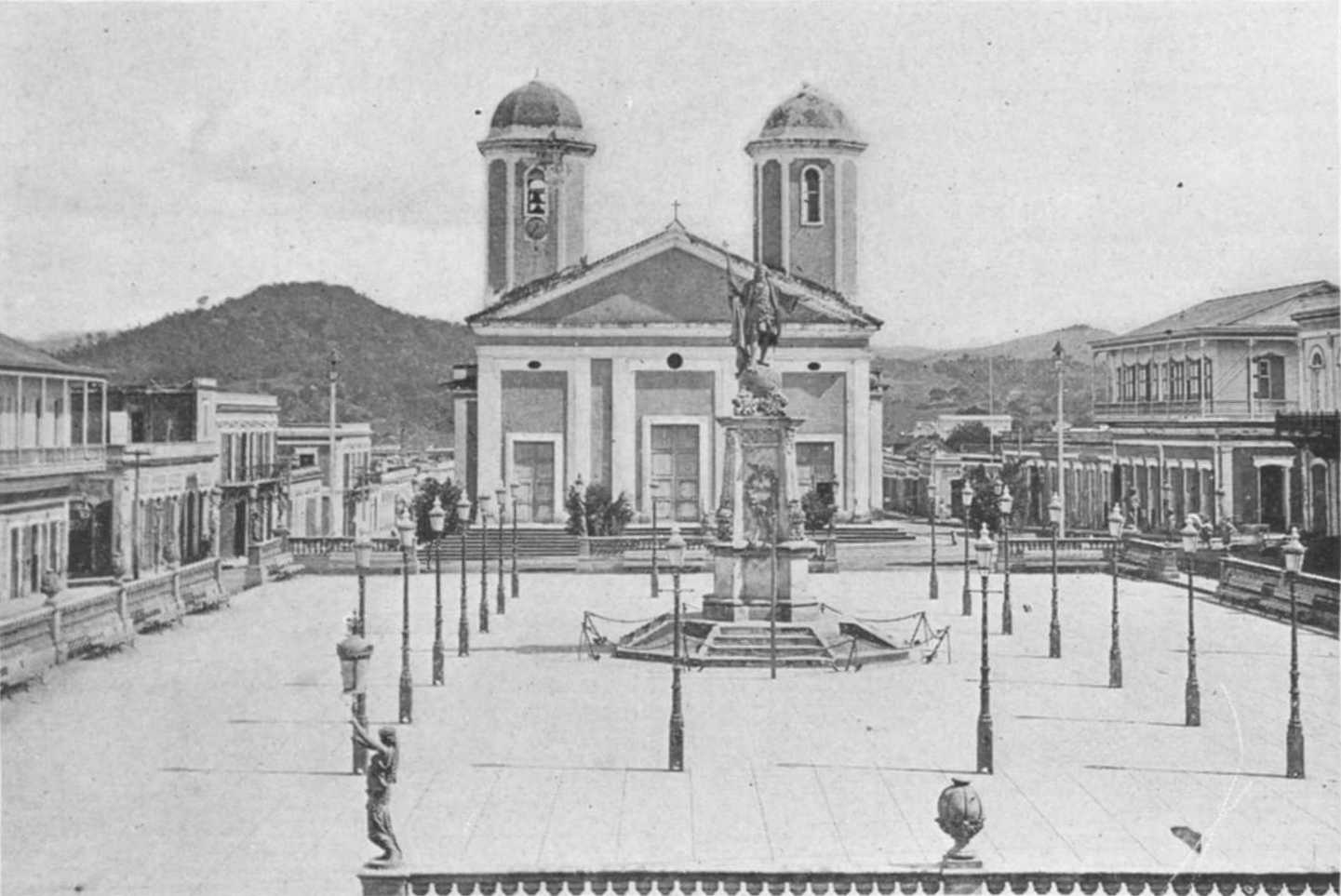
Mayagüez's Plaza Colón and Nuestra Señora de la Candelaria church (later cathedral), 1898

Mayagüez was founded on September 18, 1760, by a group led by brothers Faustino and Lorenzo Martínez de Matos, Juan de Silva and Juan de Aponte, at a hill located about one kilometer inland from Mayagüez Bay and the outlet of the Yagüez River. The Spanish Crown granted the founders the right to self-government in 1763, formally separating the town from the larger Partido de San Germán. The settlement was named Nuestra Señora de la Candelaria de Mayagüez (Our Lady of Candelaria of Mayagüez) to evoke an apparition of the Virgin Mary on the island of Tenerife, one of the Canary Islands. Most of the town's settlers, including its founders, migrated from the archipelago, whose patron saint is the Virgin of Candelaria.

On May 7, 1836, the settlement was elevated to the royal status of villa, and Rafael Mangual was named its first mayor. At the time, the villa's principal economic activity was agriculture. The famous patriot, educator, sociologist, philosopher, essayist and novelist Eugenio María de Hostos was born in Mayagüez in 1839. On July 10, 1877, the villa received its city charter from the Royal Crown of Spain.

Puerto Rico was ceded by Spain in the aftermath of the Spanish–American War under the terms of the Treaty of Paris of 1898 and became a territory of the United States. In 1899, the United States Department of War conducted a census of Puerto Rico finding that the population of Mayagüez was 35,700, making it one of the largest towns in Puerto Rico at the time.

The city's main Roman Catholic church, Our Lady of the Candelaria, was built in a plot consecrated on August 21, 1760. Its first masonry building was erected in 1780. The current church was built in 1836, and was rebuilt in 1922. The redesign by architect Luis Perocier sought to restore the building to its original splendor. The 1918 San Fermín earthquake had destroyed the temple's ceiling, and a lightning bolt struck and tore down a wedge-shaped corner of one of its two bell towers. However, lack of proper funding and the extent of the damage of the original structure forced the rebuilding to be scaled-down considerably.

In 1911, the College of Agriculture and Mechanic Arts was founded in Mayagüez. Today it is known as the University of Puerto Rico at Mayagüez (UPRM)—the Caribbean's leading engineering institution.

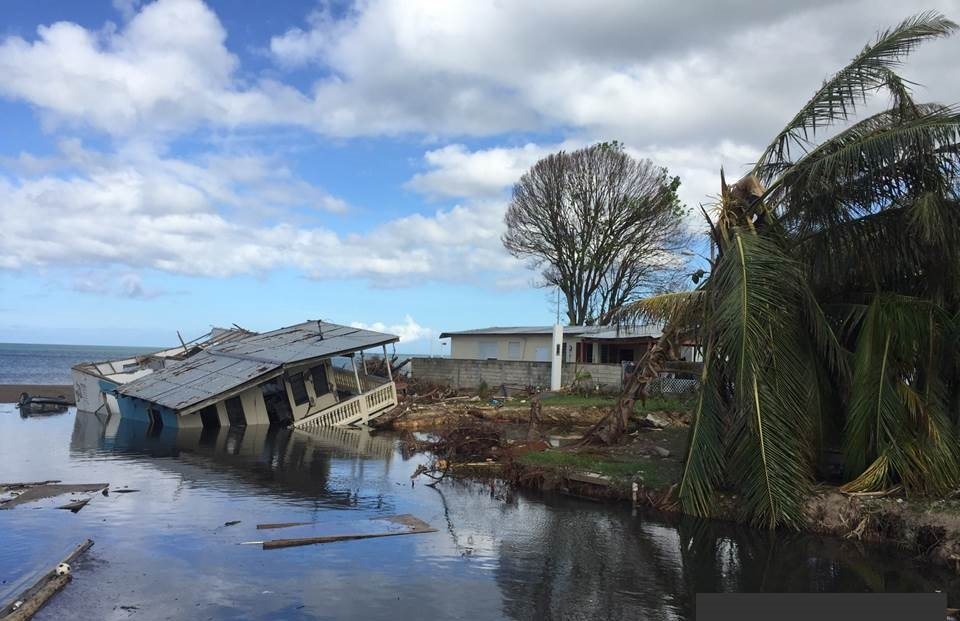
Structure in El Maní, Sabanetos, Mayagüez destroyed by Hurricane Maria

Between 1962 and 1998 Mayagüez was a major tuna canning and processing center. At one time, 80% of all tuna products consumed in the United States were packed in Mayagüez (the biggest employer, StarKist, had 11,000 employees working three daily shifts in the local plant's heyday). Mayagüez was also a major textile industry hub; almost a quarter of all drill uniforms used by the United States Army were sewn in the city. Today, Mayagüez is the fifth-largest city in Puerto Rico and is considered one of the most important cities in the island. The city is centered on the impressive Spanish-style main square Plaza Colón, a tribute to Christopher Columbus, whose statue stands in the middle of the square, surrounded by 16 bronze statues.

Mayagüez has become a major college town with the establishment of the UPRM, the now closed Eugenio María de Hostos Law School and the Pontifical Catholic University of Puerto Rico.

On September 20, 2017 Hurricane Maria struck Puerto Rico. In Mayagüez, losses were described as "catastrophic". The storm triggered numerous landslides in Mayagüez. In some areas of Mayagüez, there were over 25 landslides per square mile due to the deluge.

== Geography ==
Mayagüez is located near the geographical center of the western coast of Puerto Rico about two to three hours by automobile from San Juan. Its land area is 77.6 square miles (201.06 km^{2}). The municipality's terrain includes coast plains, river valleys, marshland, hills and mountains. The highest point is Pico San Bernardo (1,596.9 ft. / 487 m), located in the western edge of the Cordillera Central and close to the municipal border with Las Marías. Of its multiple rivers and streams, the two most important are the Yagüez River, which flows from the Central Mountain Range through downtown until it empties into the Mona Passage; and the Río Guanajibo, which flows through several neighborhoods in the southern portion of the municipality until it empties in the Mona Passage.

=== National protected areas ===
The Desecheo National Wildlife Refuge on Desecheo Island is a protected area.

To the north of the El Maní community in Mayagüez is the Boquilla Creek Wildlife Reserve (Reserva Natural del Caño de la Boquilla), a protected area and the habitat of endangered species.

== Climate ==
Mayagüez has a tropical savanna climate (Köppen climate classification Aw). The city has the most extreme weather of the island. The high frequency of severe storms in the summer can produce strong winds, floods, waterspouts, and sometimes hail and even tornadoes. The average annual temperature is 75 °F or 23.9 °C. Winter is usually quite dry and warm, with temperatures between 82 °F or 27.8 °C and 55 °F or 12.8 °C. Summer is usually very hot and humid, with temperatures reaching 95 °F or 35 °C, with heat index of up to 115 °F or 46.1 °C. From May to October, most evenings experience strong thunderstorms, due to heat, humidity and the topography of the area.

Climate data for Mayagüez, Puerto Rico (1991-2020 normals, extremes 1900-present)
Month	Jan	Feb	Mar	Apr	May	Jun	Jul	Aug	Sep	Oct	Nov	Dec	Year
Record high °F (°C)	99 (37)	96 (36)	97 (36)	98 (37)	98 (37)	98 (37)	98 (37)	99 (37)	99 (37)	102 (39)	98 (37)	96 (36)	102 (39)
Mean daily maximum °F (°C)	85.0 (29.4)	85.7 (29.8)	86.8 (30.4)	87.2 (30.7)	88.5 (31.4)	90.2 (32.3)	90.0 (32.2)	90.2 (32.3)	90.1 (32.3)	89.8 (32.1)	88.2 (31.2)	86.1 (30.1)	88.1 (31.2)
Daily mean °F (°C)	76.3 (24.6)	76.3 (24.6)	77.2 (25.1)	78.0 (25.6)	79.7 (26.5)	80.5 (26.9)	81.3 (27.4)	81.3 (27.4)	81.2 (27.3)	81.2 (27.3)	79.7 (26.5)	77.6 (25.3)	79.2 (26.2)
Mean daily minimum °F (°C)	67.6 (19.8)	66.9 (19.4)	67.6 (19.8)	68.9 (20.5)	71.0 (21.7)	70.8 (21.6)	72.6 (22.6)	72.4 (22.4)	72.3 (22.4)	72.5 (22.5)	71.3 (21.8)	69.0 (20.6)	70.2 (21.2)
Record low °F (°C)	51 (11)	43 (6)	50 (10)	57 (14)	57 (14)	60 (16)	58 (14)	58 (14)	59 (15)	61 (16)	59 (15)	55 (13)	43 (6)
Average rainfall inches (mm)	1.19 (30)	1.81 (46)	2.08 (53)	3.88 (99)	6.00 (152)	5.15 (131)	5.81 (148)	6.80 (173)	6.64 (169)	6.49 (165)	3.08 (78)	2.33 (59)	51.26 (1,302)
Average rainy days (≥ 0.01 in)	4.9	6.6	7.5	10.8	11.0	12.0	13.4	14.8	15.1	13.6	9.0	6.4	125.1
Source: NOAA

== Cityscape ==
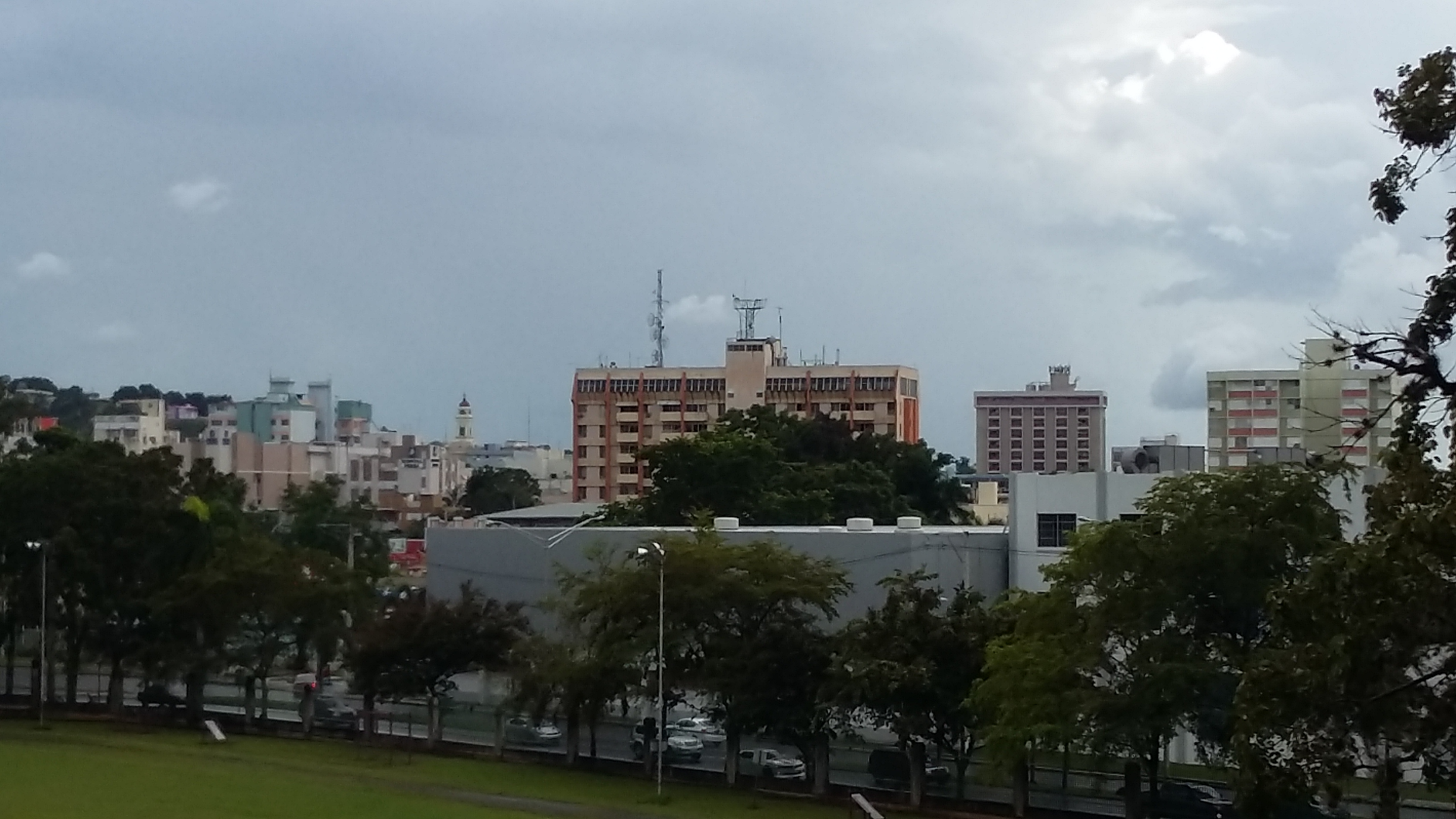
Downtown seen from the campus of the University of Puerto Rico at Mayagüez

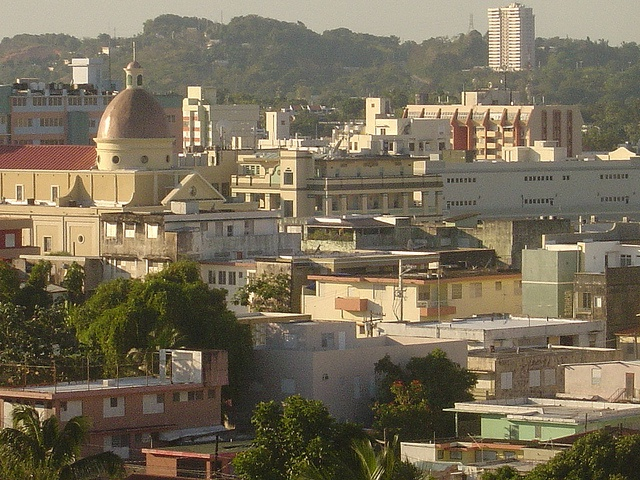
View from the center of Mayagüez

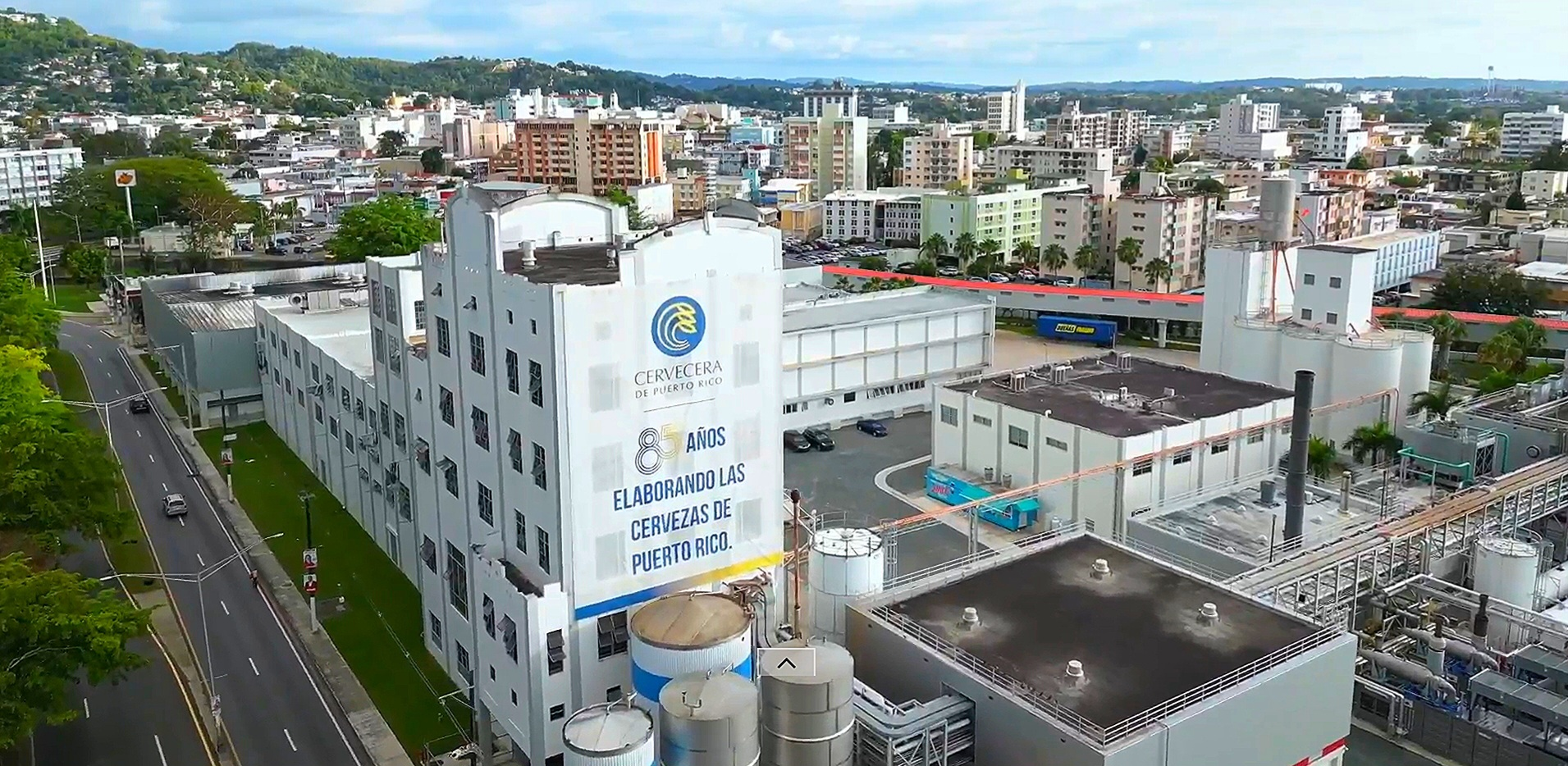
View of Downtown Mayagüez

=== Barrios ===
The municipio has an estimated population of just over 100,000 spread over 21 barrios (barrios) including Mayagüez Pueblo (The downtown area and the administrative center of the city). One of the barrios is Isla de Mona e Islote Monito, which consists of the offshore islands of Mona Island and Monito Island. This is the largest ward by land area and at the same time the only one without any permanent population. Also, uninhabited Desecheo Island belongs to the municipality as part of Sabanetas barrio.

1. Algarrobos
2. Bateyes
3. Guanajibo
4. Isla de Mona e Islote Monito
5. Juan Alonso
6. Leguísamo
7. Limón
8. Malezas
9. Mayagüez Arriba
10. Mayagüez barrio-pueblo
11. Miradero
12. Montoso
13. Naranjales
14. Quebrada Grande
15. Quemado
16. Río Cañas Abajo
17. Río Cañas Arriba
18. Río Hondo
19. Rosario
20. Sábalos
21. Sabanetas

Mayagüez Pueblo is further subdivided into these barrios:

- Candelaria
- Cárcel
- Marina Septentrional
- Marina Meridional
- Río
- Salud

=== Sectors ===
Barrios (which are, in contemporary times, roughly comparable to minor civil divisions) are further subdivided into smaller areas called sectores (sectors in English). The types of sectores may vary, from normally sector to urbanización to reparto to barriada to residencial, among others.

The sectors that comprise Mayagüez City are:

- Balboa
- Barcelona
- El Seco
- El Liceo
- El Pueblo
- La Mineral
- La Quinta
- París
- Trastalleres

Other notable neighborhoods or sectors:

- El Maní—community in Sabanetas
- Mayagüez Terrace—development in Algarrobo, near the UPRM Campus
- Alturas de Mayagüez—development in Algarrobo, near the Holiday Inn Hotel and the Regional Distribution Center
- El Cerro de las Mesas—known for being the home of "CROEM" and for its picture perfect views of the city from Camino Berrios.
- Buena Vista—a hilltop picturesque community next to the downtown area.
- Colombia—a famous former slum, alongside a Government Center.
- Columbus Landing—the second oldest public housing project (caserio) in Puerto Rico.
- Dulces Labios—a picturesque community alongside PR-2 famous for its history and its musical activities.
- Ensanche Martínez (La Bosque)—student area, near the UPRM Campus.
- Ensanche Ramírez—a hilltop high class development, near the UPRM Campus.
- Ensanche Vivaldi—student area, near the UPRM Campus.
- La Riviera—student area.
- Ponce de León—development in Mayagüez Arriba next to Luis Muñoz Rivera Park (eastern outskirts).
- Santurce—community next to the Old Municipal Cemetery.
- Vadi-Cristy—community alongside PR-2 and the downtown area.

=== Special Communities ===
Comunidades Especiales de Puerto Rico (Special Communities of Puerto Rico) are marginalized communities whose citizens are experiencing a certain amount of social exclusion. A map shows these communities occur in nearly every municipality of the commonwealth. Of the 742 places that were on the list in 2014, the following barrios, communities, sectors, or neighborhoods were in Mayagüez: Balboa, Barrio Salud, Buena Vista, Central Igualdad, Dulces Labios, El Maní, El Quemado, Felices Días, La Chorra, La Quinta, Leguízamo, Mayagüez Arriba, Parcelas Rolón, Polvorín, Quebrada Grande, Río Cañas, Río Hondo, Rosario, and Trastalleres.

== Demographics ==
Historical population
Year	Pop.	±%
1772	1,800	—
1782	1,791	−0.5%
1797	2,210	+23.4%
1828	18,267	+726.6%
1836	19,356	+6.0%
1877	26,446	+36.6%
1899	38,915	+47.1%
1910	42,429	+9.0%
1920	41,612	−1.9%
1930	58,270	+40.0%
1940	76,487	+31.3%
1950	87,307	+14.1%
1960	83,850	−4.0%
1970	85,857	+2.4%
1980	96,193	+12.0%
1990	100,371	+4.3%
2000	98,434	−1.9%
2010	89,080	−9.5%
2020	73,077	−18.0%
2025 (est.)	68,905	−5.7%

According to 2009 U.S. Census Bureau estimates, there were 92,156 people (down from 98,434 in 2000) in 38,469 housing units residing in Mayagüez. The population density was 1,187 inhabitants per square mile (458/km^{2}). The city has a considerable "college population" adding approximately 10,000 people to the year round population of Mayagüez. People of Hispanic or Latino origin, who may be of any race, composed 98.9% of the population.

Of the 31,877 households in 2007 in Mayagüez, 38.6% were married couples living together, 22.3% had a female householder with no husband present, and 33.7% were non-families. 33.3% had children under the age of 18 living in them. Of all households 27.8% were made up of individuals, and 9.8% had someone living alone who was 65 years of age or older. The average household size was 2.75 and the average family size was 3.41.

In Mayagüez, the population was spread out, with 26.9% under the age of 18, 10.3% from 18 to 24, 30.8% from 25 to 44, 20.6% from 45 to 64, and 11.5% who were 65 years of age or older. The median age was 33 years. Mayagüez had more women, with 88.4 males for every 100 females.

As of 2000, speakers of English as a first language accounted for 15.14% of the population.

Mayagüez 2020 census
Race	Population	%
White	14,372	19.7
Black	3,331	4.6
American Indian and Alaska Native	306	0.4
Asian	102	0.1
Native Hawaiian/Pacific Islander	24	0.0
Some other race	16,878	23.1
Two or more races	38,064	52.1

== Economy ==
The city has had several natural disasters. It faced a major economic downturn due to the closure of its textile factories and tuna industry, which were the principal industries of the city for the greater part of the 20th century. Over 11,000 permanent jobs in these two industries were lost in the city during the 1990s, and because of this, Mayagüez became the jurisdiction of the United States with the second most industrial job losses during the time, second only to Flint, Michigan. Once the third city in population and importance in Puerto Rico, population numbers for it have been relatively stagnant, and it has lost population.

Mayagüez has a floating population due to its universities, principally the University of Puerto Rico- Mayagüez Campus of about 15,000–20,000 which contributes considerably to its economy.

In 2005 Winston-Salem Industries for The Blind was the first industry to move into the city's industrial park in many years. In July 2007 Honeywell opened a customer support service center for its aerospace and information technology divisions in the city.

As of 2023, Bureau of Labor Statistics data revealed that the Mayagüez metropolitan area had the worst-paid lawyers in the United States, with an annual average salary of only $62,380.

== Culture ==
=== Contributions to Puerto Rican gastronomy ===
Mayagüez's contributions to Puerto Rican gastronomy have been many, and a few of these are known outside Puerto Rico. Besides being host to one of the largest concentrations of mango trees in the island, the city has been a host to various food enterprises whose products are popular in Puerto Rico (and elsewhere):

- Brazo gitano – literally "gypsy arm", is the locally produced Swiss or jelly roll, originally from Spain. E. Franco & Co., a bakery, food importer, and restaurant established in the late 1850s, is the best-known provider of brazos gitanos in town. Another (more recent) provider is Ricomini Bakery, whose central store in downtown Mayagüez has been open for over 100 years.
- Sangría de Fido – the heirs of Wilfrido Aponte still bottle "Sangría de Fido", a powerful concoction inspired by sangria, but made with fruit juices, Bacardi 151 rum and burgundy wine (technically not from Bourgogne, but produced by E & J Gallo Winery in Modesto, California). It had been bottled by hand by the bartender since the mid-1970s. "Sangría de Fido" has a sizeable reputation outside Puerto Rico, and can claim tasters from as far away as California and Spain. E & J Gallo once awarded Aponte with a "Customer of the Year" award and flew him to their headquarters. Aponte was reportedly offered $250,000 by Bacardi to sell his original recipe once, to which he refused.
- Bolo's Sorullitos – a now-defunct operation that originated at Bolo's Restaurant, a seaside eatery next to Mayagüez Bay, which produced sorullitos, or fried cornsticks, along with mayo-ketchup, a dip made of mayonnaise, ketchup, and garlic extract. The restaurant was popular in Puerto Rico between the late 1970s and mid-1980s (its custom-made building now houses WORA-TV, one of the local television stations). For a while the frozen cornsticks were sold commercially in stores.
- Flan-Es-Cedó' – Elmec Industries, Inc. has been the local flan producer for over thirty years
- India / Medalla beer – the only remaining mass-produced Puerto Rican beer is brewed by "Cervecería India", one of the largest employers in town. Mayagüezanos are queued into morning rush hour, lunch and afternoon rush hour by the company's whistle, which rings at 7:00 am, 8:00 am, 12:00 pm, 1:00 p.m. and 5:00 p.m. (all times AST)
- Rex Cream's Ice Cream – established in the mid-1960s by Chinese migrants who came to Puerto Rico by the way of Costa Rica, Rex Cream is a chain of ice cream parlors that had its heyday in the late 1970s. The two flagship stores in Mayagüez, however, are still popular (particularly on Good Friday, since one of the stores is the endpoint for a Good Friday religious procession) for producing alternative ice cream flavors, particularly a corn sherbet.
- Tuna fish – At one time, StarKist, Chicken of the Sea, and Bumble Bee produced 80% of their collective production for consumption in the United States in Mayagüez. The last remaining tuna fish cannery closed in 2012 when Bumble Bee shuttered their operation.
- A new distillery was founded in Mayagüez in 2009, Destilería Coquí. Its production is limited to 100 bottles a day, their main product is artisan rum called pitorro.

A defunct cola bottling operation in town produced "Vita Cola", a popular soft drink in Puerto Rico between the late 1940s and early 1960s.

Mayagüez was a major rum producing city in Puerto Rico between the 1930s and 1970s. Several brands were produced by the city's three rum distillers. The most successful rum producing operation at the time was José González Clemente y Co., the bottlers of Ron Superior Puerto Rico, an award-winning dark rum that was bottled between 1909 and the late-1970s.

=== Festivals and events ===
Mayagüez celebrates its patron saint festival in late January / early February. The Fiestas Patronales Virgen de la Candelaria is a religious and cultural celebration that generally features parades, games, artisans, amusement rides, regional food, and live entertainment.

Other festivals and events celebrated in Mayagüez include:

- Three Kings Day Festival – January
- Romance on the Boulevard – February
- Bomba and plena festival – February/March
- Mothers Day concert – May
- Fathers Day concert – June
- Mayagüez Carnival – May
- Danza Festival – May
- Celebration of the founding of Mayagüez – September
- Crafts fair – November
- Christmas festivities – December
- Anniversary of the Puerto Rican flag – December
- Pedestrian Mayagüez at Plaza Colon – third Sunday of the month

=== Sports ===
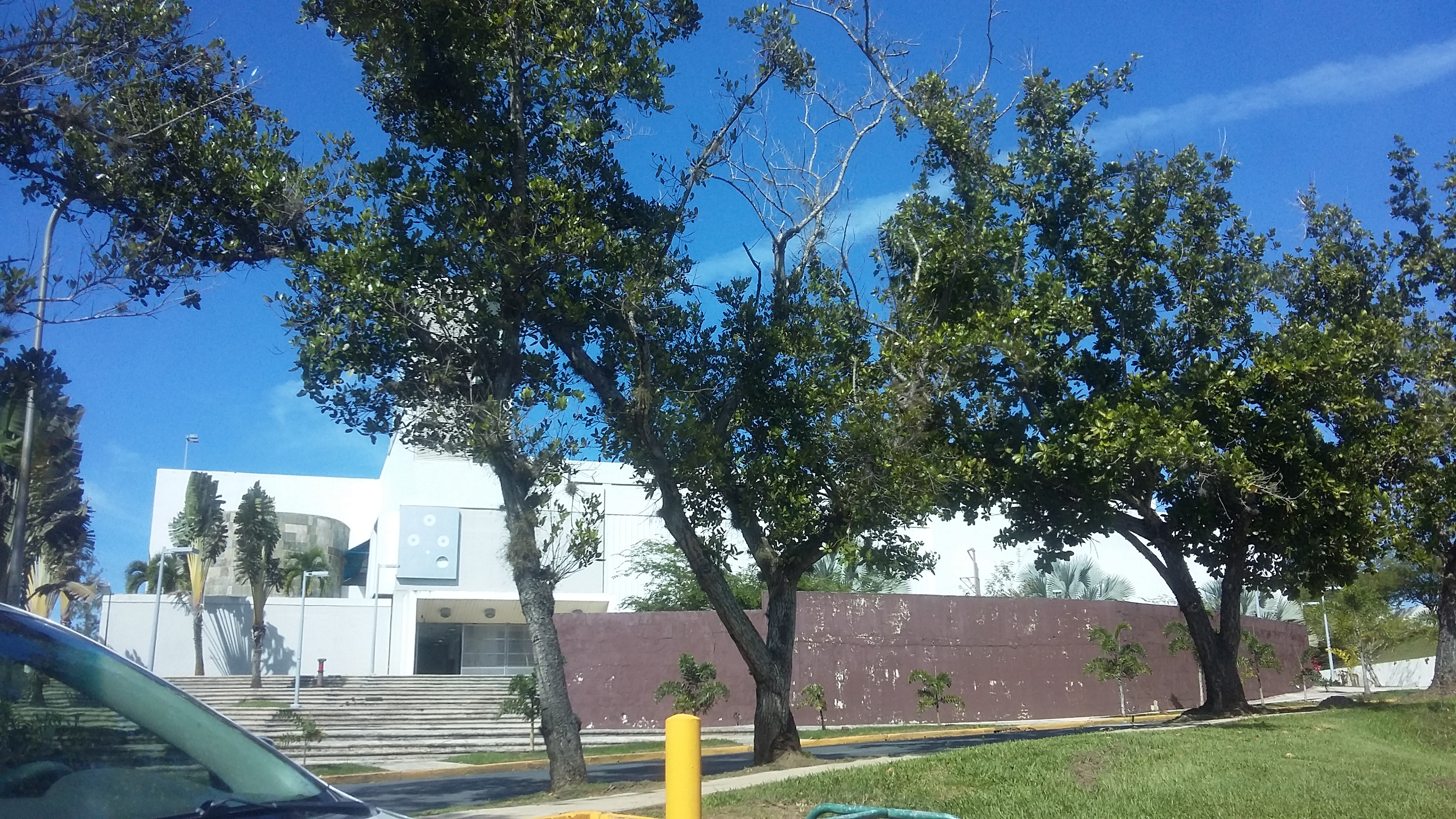
Natatorium built for the 2010 games at the UPR Mayagüez Campus

Mayagüez hosted the 2010 Central American and Caribbean Games for which the local and commonwealth governments have provided an investment of $250 million for, among other things, building two new stadiums (the first a re-built Isidoro García Baseball Stadium the second next to it a track and field and soccer stadium. Mayagüez also hosted the 2011 Caribbean Series.

Mayagüez's National Superior Basketball League (BSN) professional basketball team, the Indios de Mayagüez, are named in honor of the city's Indian heritage. Its baseball winter league team (LBPPR), the Indios de Mayagüez, honor their Indian heritage and the home town's Cervecería India brewery. The professional soccer club Puerto Rico Sol, plays locally at local Mayagüez Athletics Stadium. The professional volleyball team Indias de Mayagüez from Liga de Voleibol Superior Femenino, plays locally at local Palacio de Recreación y Deportes.

The "Justas" or inter-university games of the Liga Atlética Interuniversitaria de Puerto Rico, were held in Mayagüez in 2010 in preparation for the Central American and Caribbean Games. Subsequently they were held in Mayagüez in 2016 and 2017 before it was announced in 2023 that Mayagüez would become the permanent host of the event at least until 2028.

== Tourism ==
There are 13 beaches in Mayagüez.

=== Landmarks and places of interest ===
- Centro Cultural Baudilio Vega Berríos (Municipal Cultural Center)
- Casa Consistorial De Mayagüez (City Hall & City Council Chambers)
- Casa Grande Museum
- Gomez Residence
- India Brewery
- Plaza Colón
- Customs House (U.S. Customs and Border Protection)
- Parque del Litoral Israel "Shorty" Castro
- Saint Andrew's Episcopal Church
- Eugenio María de Hostos Monument
- Central Presbyterian Church (Presbyterian Church (USA)
- Hostos Museum at Río Cañas Arriba barrio
- José de Diego Park
- Mayagüez Children's Library
- Mayagüez Mall
- Mayagüez Resort & Casino
- TRYP by Wyndham Mayagüez
- Holiday Inn and Tropical Casino
- Western Plaza
- Parque de los Próceres (Notable's Park)
- Parque Infantil del Milenio (Millennium Child Park)
- Public Library (at Municipal Cultural Center)
- Tropical Agricultural Research Station(USDA ARS Station)
- Teatro Yagüez (Yaguez Theater/Municipal Theater)
- University of Puerto Rico at Mayagüez (El Colegio)
- Urayoán Monument
- RUM Planetarium
- RUM General Library
- Teatro Balboa. (Second Municipal Theater)
- Tienda-Almacén Siempreviva

=== Gallery ===
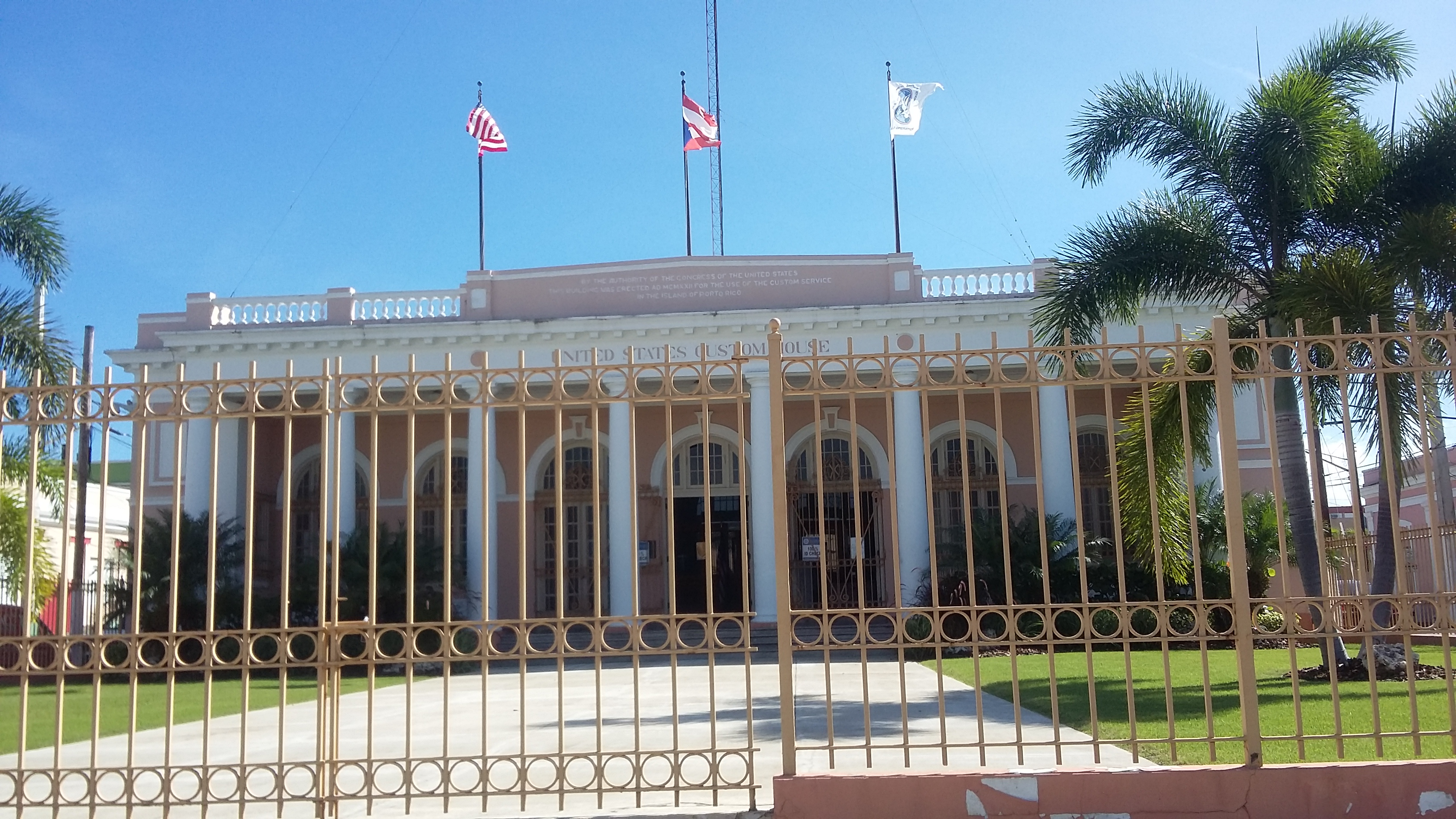
Customs House in Marina sector. Register of Historic Places

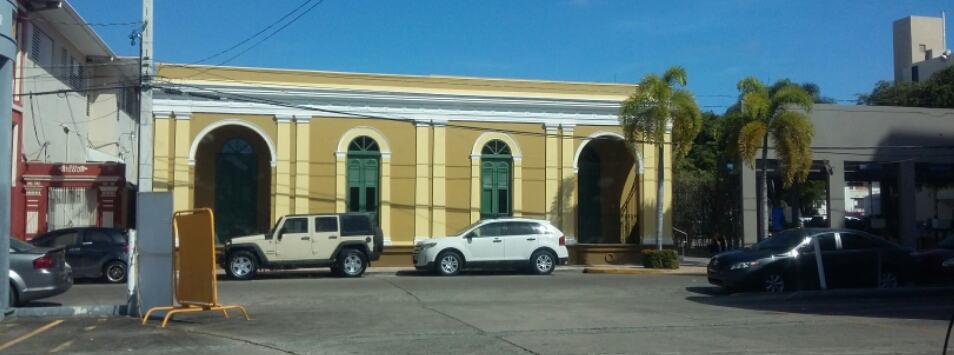
Museum House of Pilar Defilló (mother of Pablo Casals)

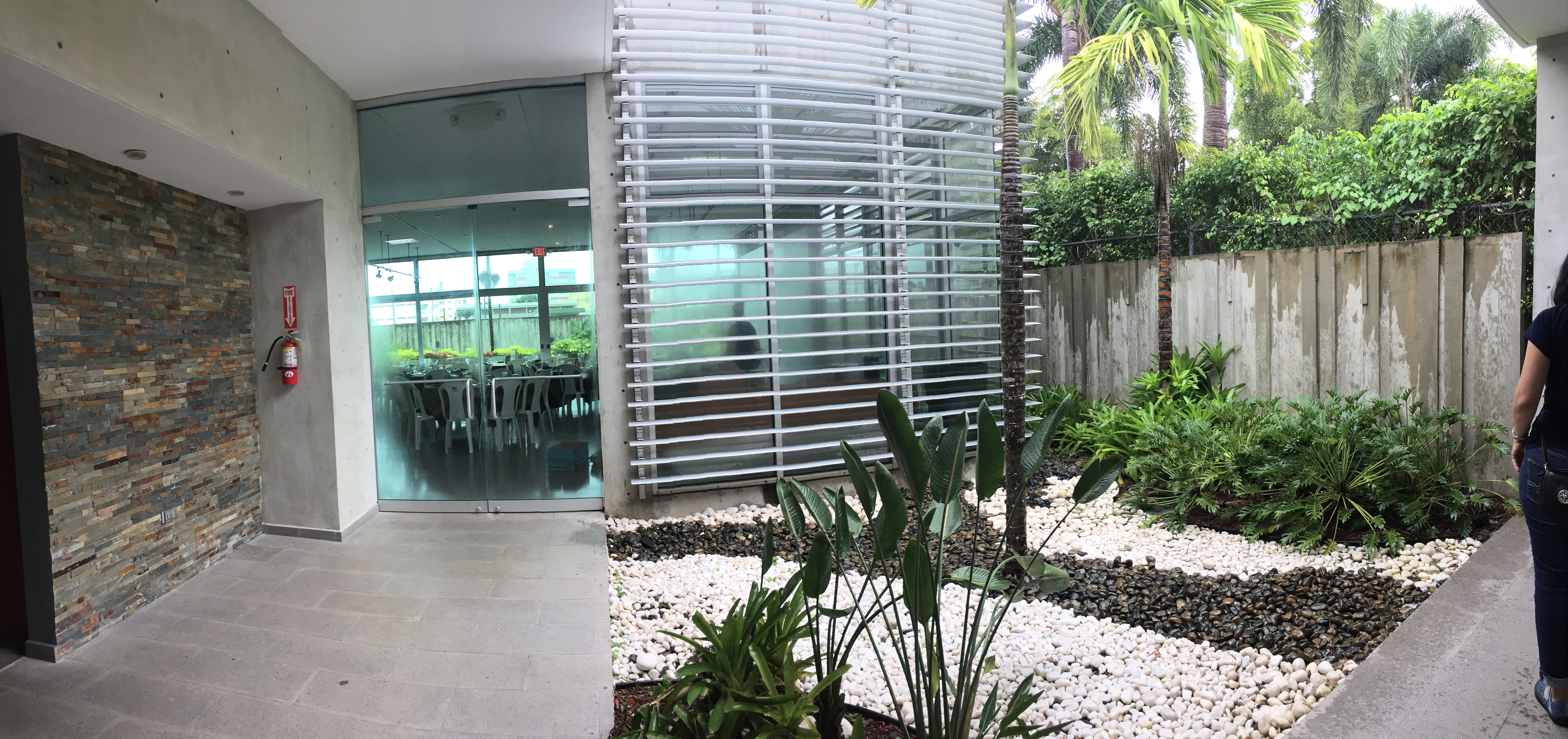
Entrance to the House Museum of Pilar Defilló

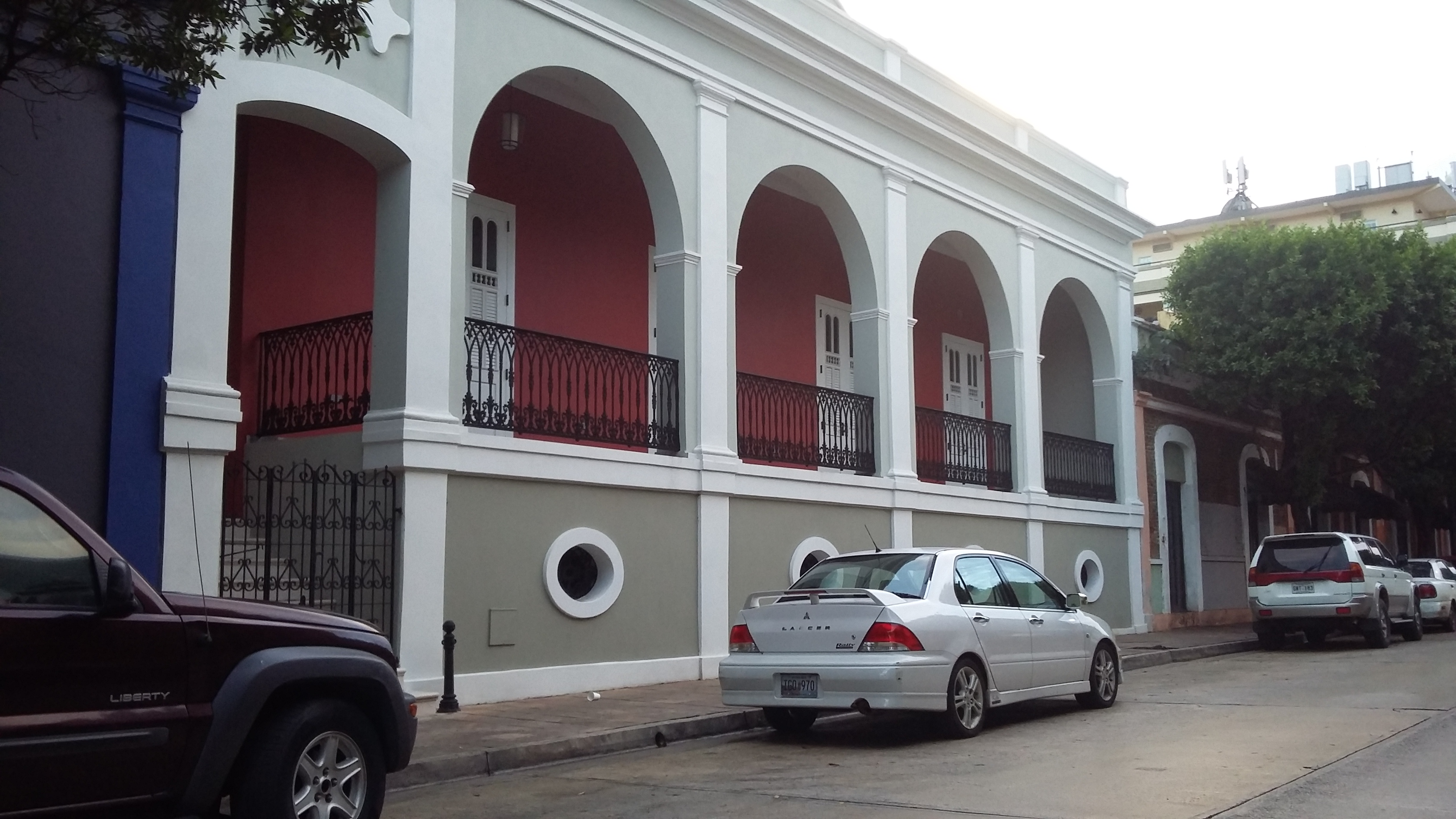
Casa Grande museum at Mendez Vigo Street

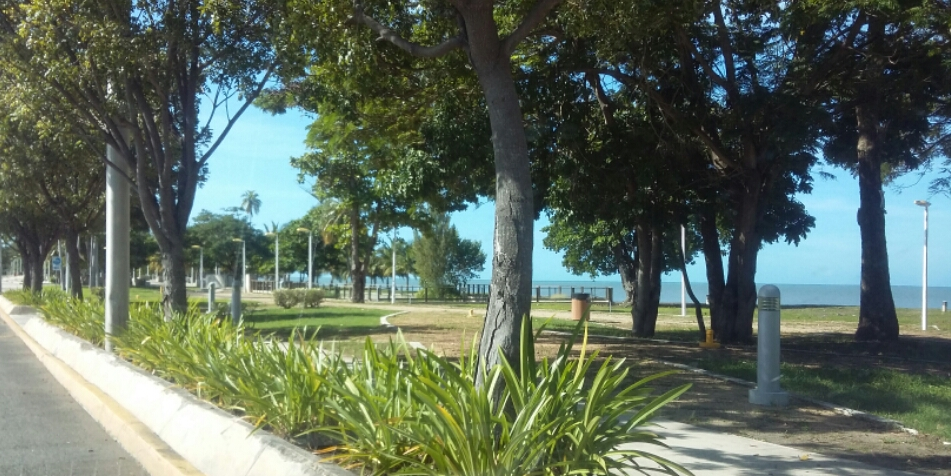
Parque del Litoral

Plaza Colón with City Hall on background, Christmas 2006

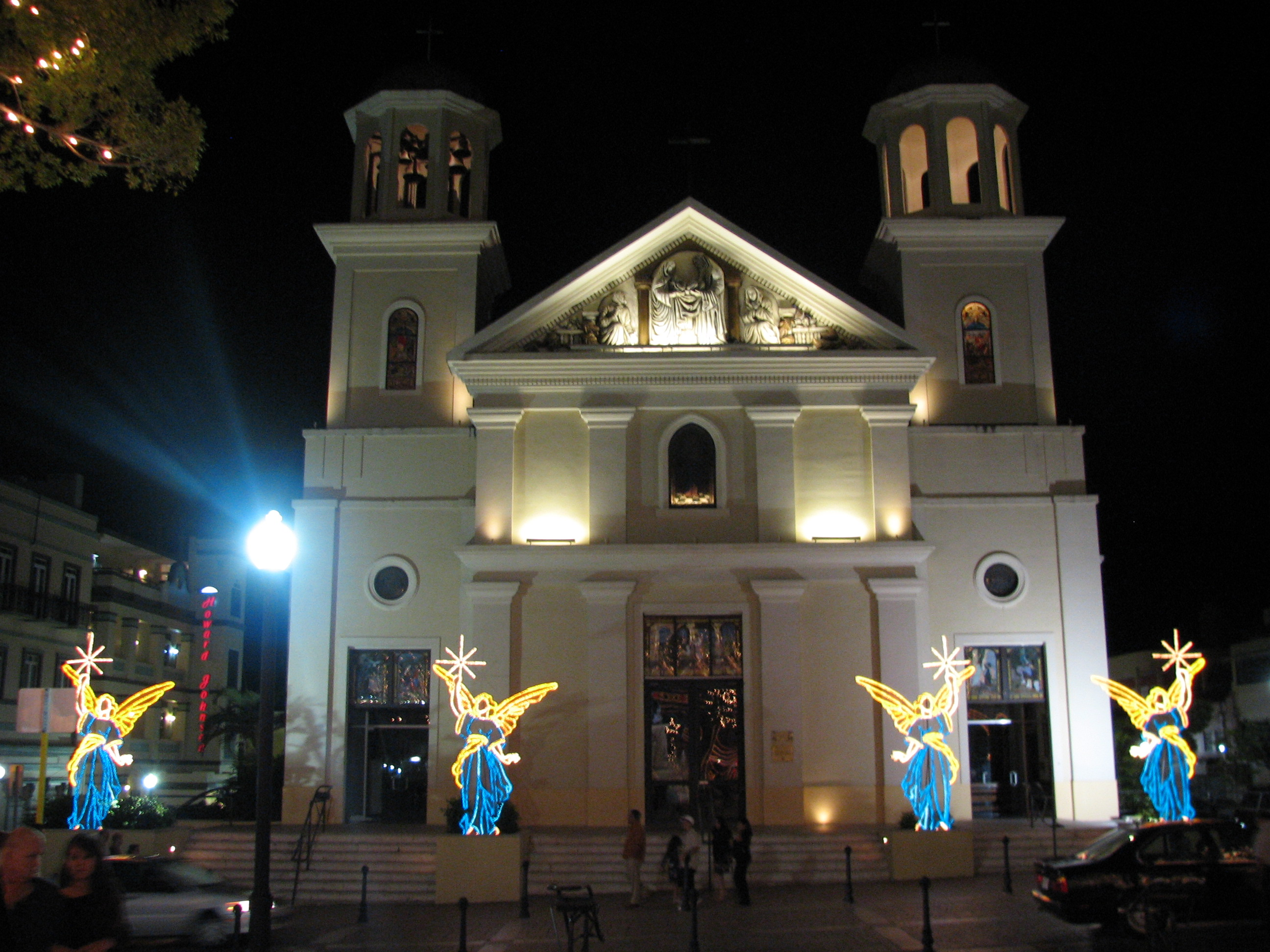
Nuestra Señora de la Candelaria Cathedral, Christmas 2006

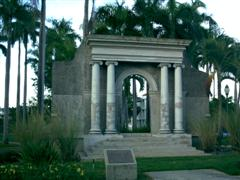
University of Puerto Rico, Mayagüez – Portico

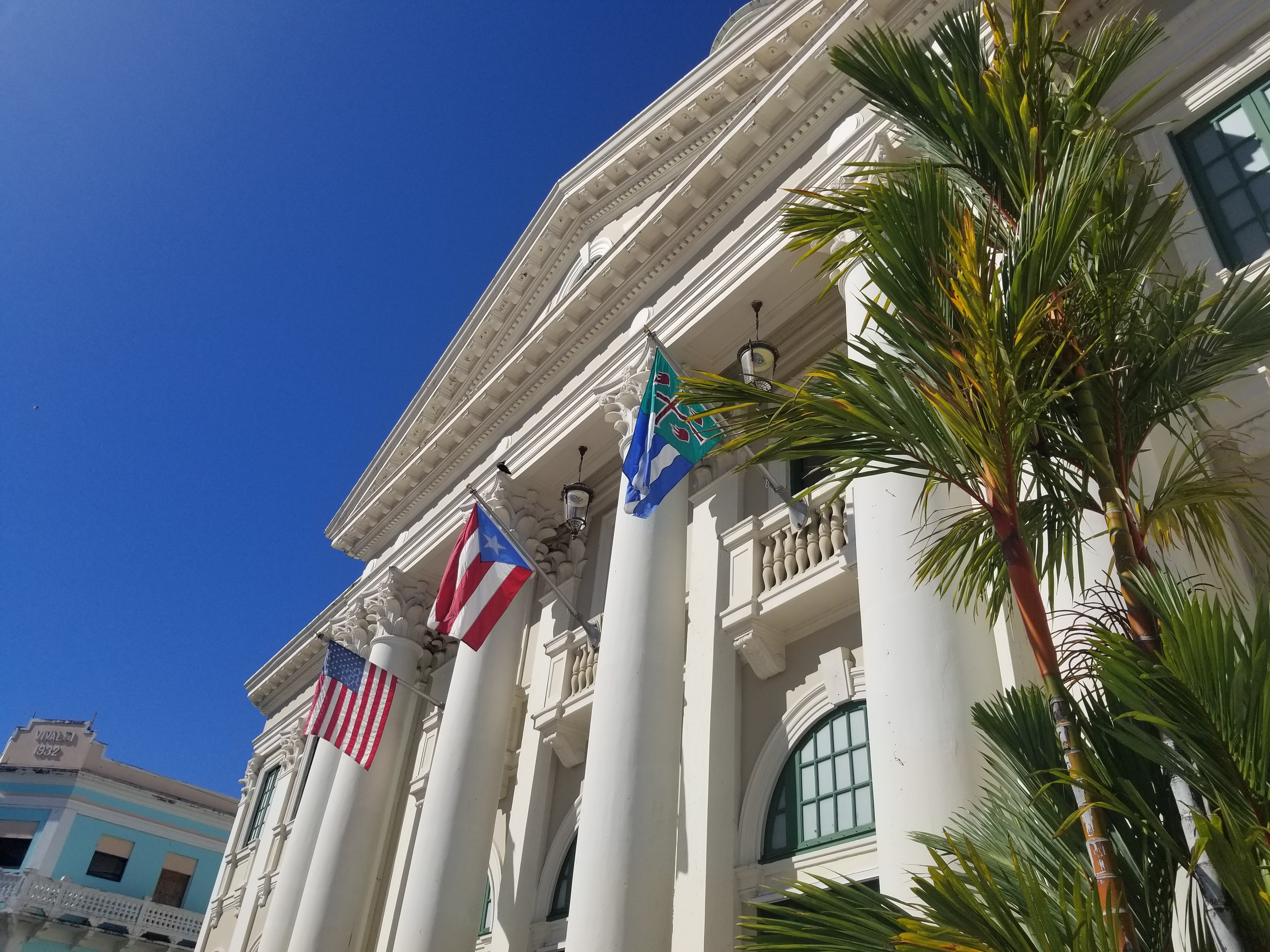
Close up of city hall

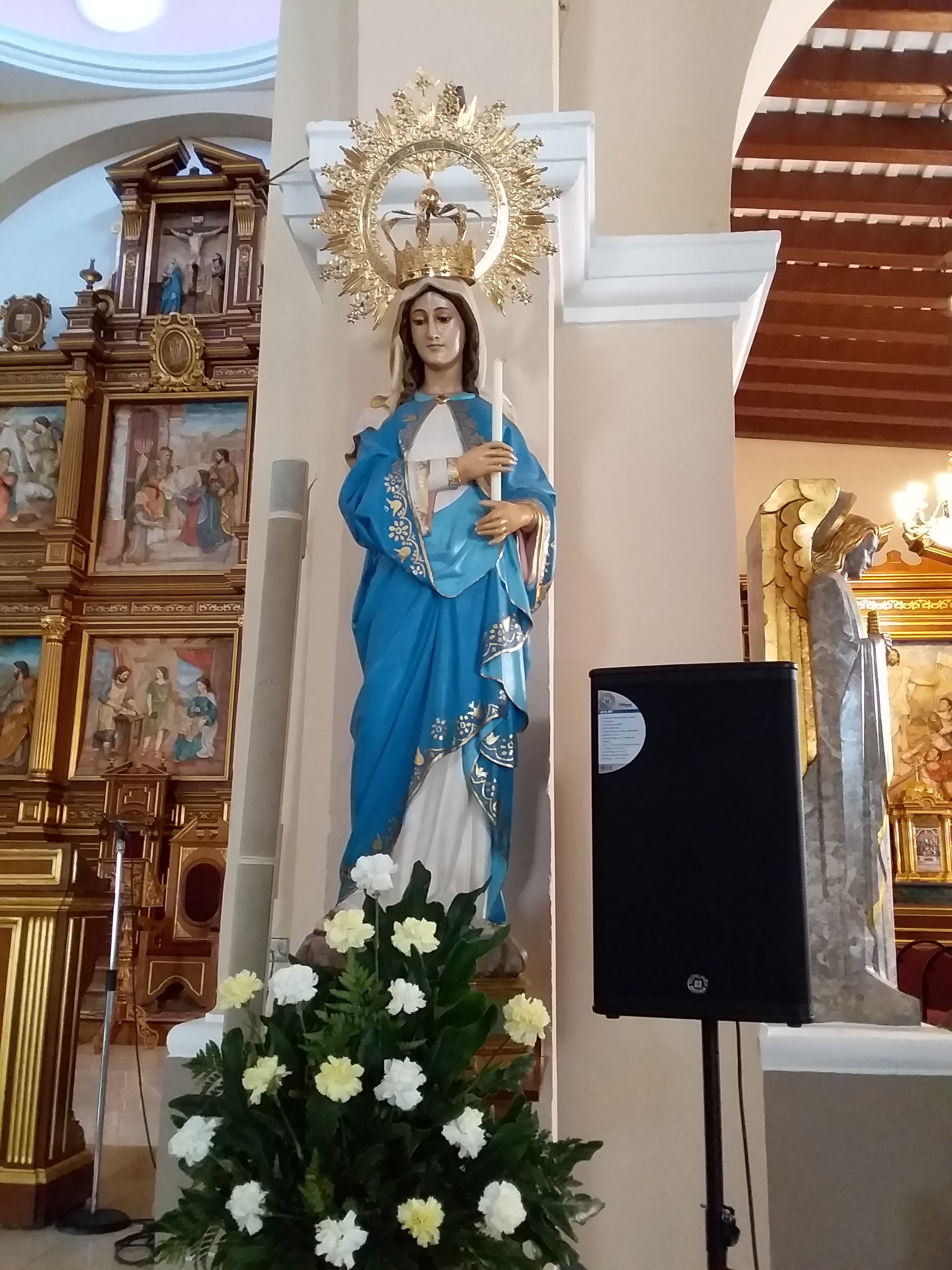
Statue of Our Lady of the Candles(Candelaria), in the Cathedral.

== Government ==
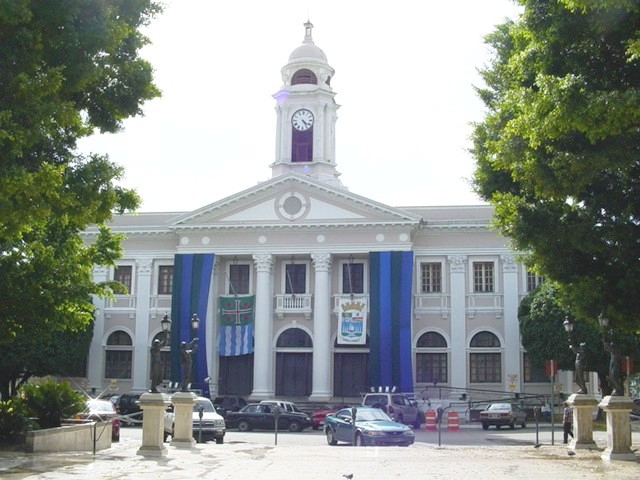
Alcaldía de Mayagüez (Mayagüez City Hall), 2005

As one of Puerto Rico's 78 municipalities, Mayagüez's government has two executive and legislative branches. Those citizens eligible to vote, directly elect a mayor and the municipal assembly for four-year terms. The municipal government is housed in Mayagüez City Hall or Casa Alcaldia, which faces the south side of the Plaza de Colon.

A popularly elected mayor heads the executive branch, currently Jorge Luis Ramos Ruiz, serves in the position as Mayor. In addition to running the city's day-to-day operations and supervising associated departments, the mayor is also responsible for appointing a secretary-auditor and a treasurer.

In the 2024 general elections, Ramos Ruiz was elected to serve a full, four-year term after serving as Interim Mayor since 2022.

Mayagüez's Municipal Assembly comprises sixteen elected officials, as defined in the Puerto Rico Law of Autonomous Municipalities of 1991.

The city belongs to the Puerto Rico Senatorial district IV, which is represented by two Senators. In 2024, Jeison Rosa and Karen Michelle Román Rodríguez, both from the New Progressive Party (PNP), were elected as District Senators.

=== Public services ===
Law enforcement in Mayagüez is the joint responsibility of the Mayagüez Municipal Police Department and the Puerto Rico Police Department. The first fire fighters corps in the city was created in 1876.

The city has three Puerto Rico Police (State Police) facilities and one Municipal Police station, it also has the regional office of the State Emergency Management Bureau(NMEAD) as well as the offices of the Puerto Rico Seismic Network(Red Sismica de Puerto Rico) and the Caribbean Tsunami Warning Program who share facilities in the University of Puerto Rico Mayagüez Campus.

It has numerous private ambulance service organizations which covered wide parts of the western coast of Puerto Rico and choose Mayagüez for its central location to the region.

There are small volunteer organizations dedicated to aiding police and emergency services as requested by such.

== Symbols ==
The municipio has an official flag and coat of arms.

=== Flag ===
The wide cross represents Christianity brought to the New World by Christopher Columbus, who signed his documents with the phrase and the motto Christ Ferens, which means: "He who has Christ." The blue and white waves between the third and fourth quarters recall the coat of arms granted to Columbus by kings Ferdinand and Isabella. The waves represent the ocean (and particularly the Mona Passage) through which he sailed to bring the gospel to these new lands. The blue and white waves symbolize the Yagüez River and evokes the nickname City of Pure Waters. The red and white flames on the flag symbolize the traditional bonfires of Day of Our Lady of Candelaria ("Día de La Candelaria"), ignited in honor of the city's patron saint (a tradition started for Spanish settlers from the Canary Islands). The flag was officially adopted with the signing of City Ordinance 38, signed December 3, 1996.

=== Coat of arms ===
According to the Puerto Rican historian Federico Cedó Alzamora, the original version of the coat of arms of Mayagüez was given to the city December 19, 1894, by the Queen Regent of Spain Maria Christina of Austria. The upper half of the coat of arms shows the columbine coat of arms recalls and commemorates the discovery of the Island of Borinquén (Puerto Rico) by Columbus in his second trip to the New World in 1493. The lower half of the coat of arms shows a stylized version of Columbus's landing on Puerto Rico. The explorer's crew disembarked at the western coast of the island, where several rivers spill their waters in the Mona Passage, among them the Yagüez, from which the name of Mayagüez is derived. The present version was reinterpreted by heraldist Roberto Biascochea Lota.

=== Anthem ===
The city's anthem was written by pianist and former music teacher Luciano Quiñones, a long-time resident and now "adopted son" of the city. Until this song's adoption, the plena "A Mayagüez", written by César Concepción, was used by many as an unofficial city song. Quiñones' composition was the winner of a contest sponsored by the city's municipality in 2003.

Mayor José Guillermo Rodríguez and the Municipal Legislature entrusted the Advisory Board of Art and Culture of Mayagüez to hold a contest to select an anthem for the city. The selected composition was a danza by Mr Luciano Quiñones, who has a bachelor's degree in music, a piano professor the Escuela Libre de Música de Mayagüez, he is a music composer already winning nineteen abarrios in competitions held by the Institute of Puerto Rican culture, and the Circulo de Recreo de San Germán. The lyrics alludes to the emblematic symbols of Mayagüez; its nicknames, to its Patron Saint, its taste of mango, to its sunsets in the bay, to the Taíno, to Eugenio María de Hostos, their role as cultural cradle, the sympathy of the ladies and the dream of its valleys and its mountains.

The anthem was presented to the people in a memorable concert held in commemoration of the 239 anniversary of the founding of the city on the night of September 18, 1999, interpreted by tenor, Mayagüez adopted son, Rafael José Díaz, Mayagüezana lyric soprano, Hilda Ramos, accompanied by the Puerto Rico Symphony Orchestra conducted by its Associate Director, Mayagüezana Roselyn Pabón, in the same place where such Symphony Orchestra offered his first concert forty years earlier: the Plaza Colón. This danza was recognized as the official anthem of Mayagüez through the Municipal Ordinance number 58, series 1999–2000, adopted on December 20, 1999, by the City Council, which was signed by the Mayor, Honorable José Guillermo Rodríguez on December 24, 1999.

MIDI and recorded versions of the anthem can be listened to here.

== Education ==
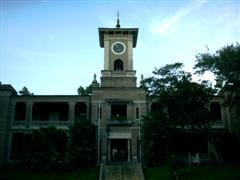
UPRM Central Administration Building

=== Public schools ===
The Residential Center for Educative Opportunities of Mayagüez, (CROEM) is one of only two public boarding schools in Puerto Rico. The largest public high school in town is Eugenio María de Hostos High School. The other public high school in Mayagüez is Dr. Pedro Perea Fajardo Vocational High School. The former José De Diego High School was finally closed in 2009.

=== Private schools ===
The non-profit Southwestern Educational Society (SESO) maintains the Southwestern Community School, an English language college preparatory school. Other private schools include: Colegio San Benito, (CSB) (Saint Benedict College), the Academia de la Inmaculada Concepción (Academy of the Immaculate Conception), Colegio De La Milagrosa (College of Our Lady of Miracles), the Academia Adventista del Oeste (Western Adventist Academy) and Academia Adventista de Bella Vista (Bella Vista Adventist Academy), Theopolis Christian Academy (TCA)

=== Colleges and universities ===
Mayagüez has become a major college town, due in part to various higher learning institutions in the city.

- University of Puerto Rico at Mayagüez
- Pontifical Catholic University of Puerto Rico at Mayagüez
- Antillean Adventist University
- Carlos Albizu University

There are also a number of junior colleges in the city:

- ICPR Junior College
- Northbridge University - División Técnica
- Northbridge University
- Escuela Hotelera de San Juan - Recinto de Mayagüez
- Mayagüez Institute

=== Health care and hospitals ===
- Mayagüez Medical Center
- Hospital Perea
- Mayagüez Medical Center: San Antonio
- Hospital Bella Vista
- Clinica Yaguez
- Policlinica Bella Vista

== Transportation ==
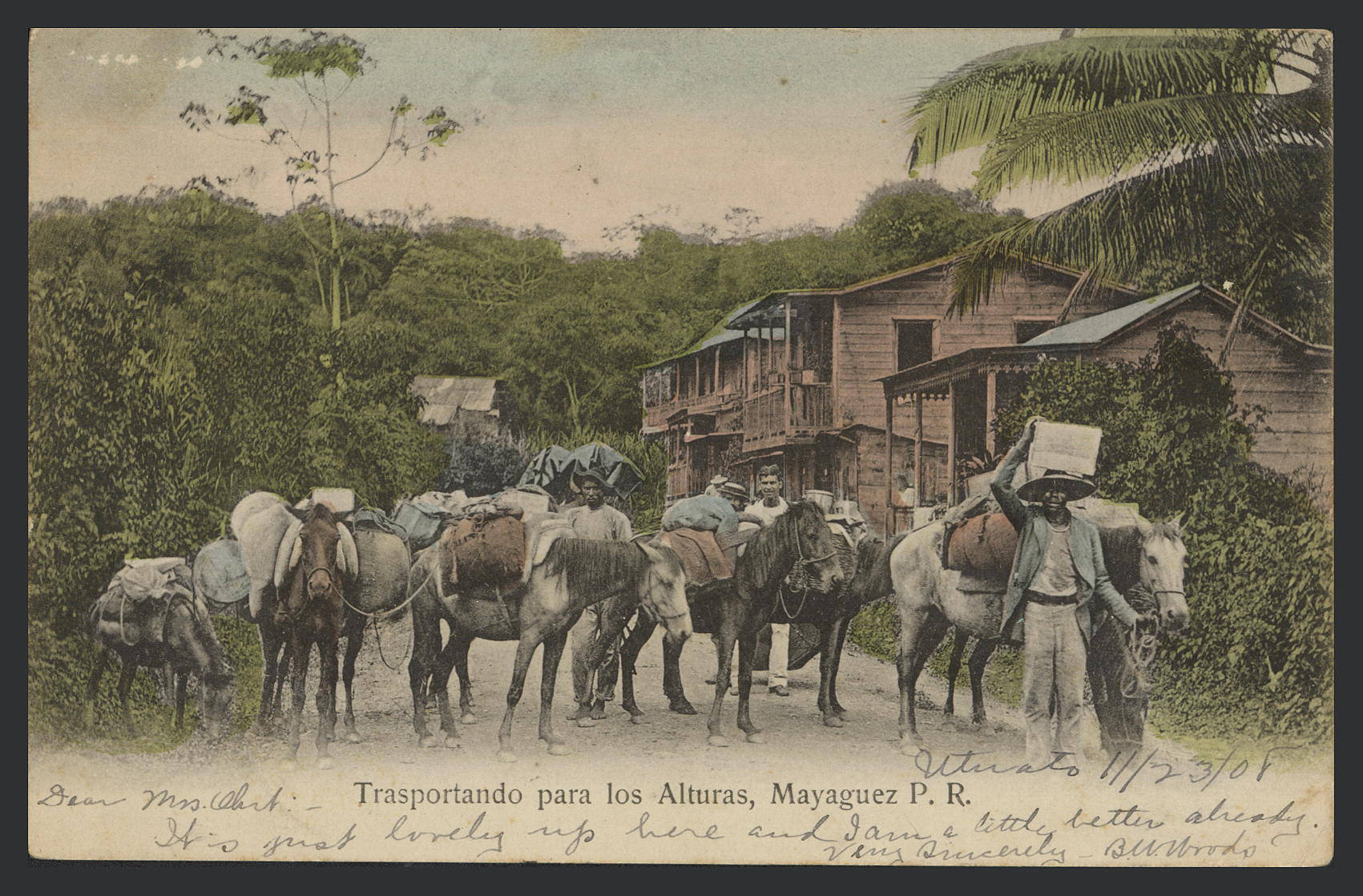
Across the mountains, 1908

=== Roads and highways ===
The dominant mode of transportation in Puerto Rico is the automobile. Mayagüez is served by two highways linking it to other parts of the island.

Puerto Rico Highway 2 existing as an arterial road is a primary route between Ponce to the south-east and Aguadilla and Arecibo to the north and north-east respectively. PR-2 is undergoing a conversion to a freeway between Ponce and Mayagüez.

Another important route in Mayagüez is PR-102. It begins at an intersection with PR-2, about 2 miles north of Mayagüez Pueblo at the Mar y Sol development and runs along Mayagüez's coastal industrial areas to Joyuda, where it then turns east and terminates in Sabana Grande.

The portion of the highway adjacent to the Estadio Isidoro Garcia was upgraded from a two-lane road into an urban boulevard in anticipation of the 2010 Centro-American and Caribbean Games celebrated in Mayagüez. In addition to this upgrade, an elevated by-pass was constructed from the coastal park site over the Yagüez River ending at the Concordia Housing Project.

There are 41 bridges in Mayagüez.

=== Public transportation ===
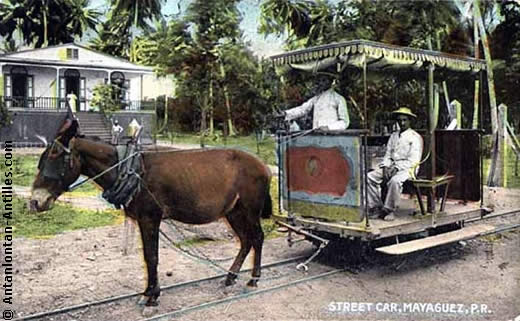
Horse-driven tram, Mayagüez

Transportation in Mayagüez is limited to a trolley service, various private taxi companies and an occasional daytime syndicated público service named Mayagüez Urbano (Urban Mayagüez) that provide transportation between the main points of the city at a cost of $2.00 per route. Passenger transportation between Mayagüez and San Juan is operated by the Linea Sultana, another syndicated service.

The city operates three trolleys, free of charge, which run as shuttles between the downtown area and the Palacio de Recreación y Deportes.

The University of Puerto Rico at Mayagüez (UPRM) also runs an internal network of trolleys to carry its students inside campus and between UPRM's Mayagüez Terrace development and Palacio de Recreación y Deportes, linking here with the city's trolley service. There are some proposals to expand the municipal trolley service to serve inside the UPRM.

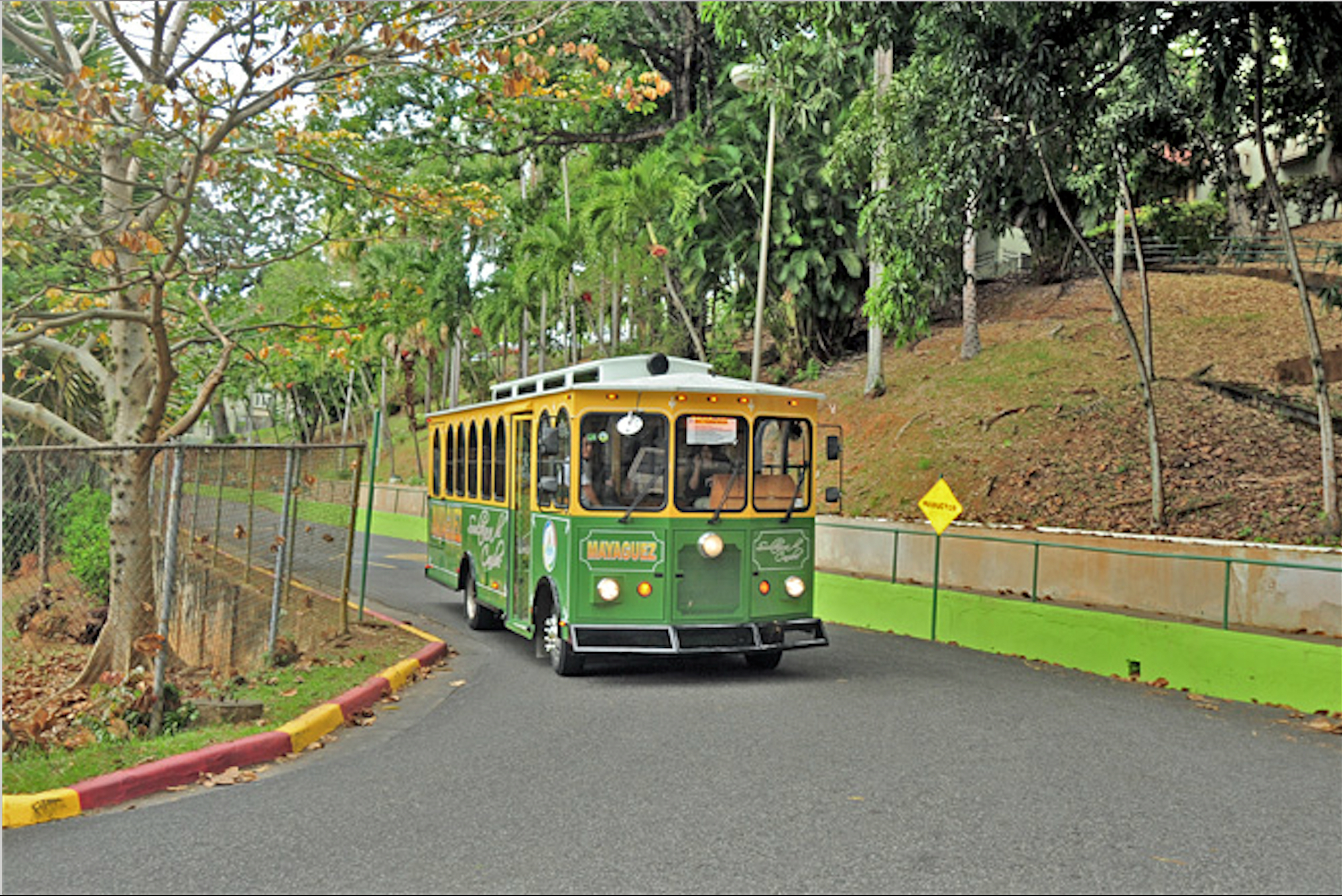
Trolley passing through the university (CAAM)

For the 2010 Central American and Caribbean Games the Puerto Rico's Department of Transportation and Public Works released an express public bus system operated with Autoridad Metropolitana de Autobuses (San Juan's Metropolitan Bus Authority) buses specially assigned to serve the city of Mayagüez. During the Mayagüez 2010 Games, this bus network was carrying passengers in a corridor along Highway 2 and some main roads. The UPRM trolleybus network was integrated into this service too. Although suspended after the Mayagüez 2010 Games ended, the system is expected to be re-established shortly.

=== Seaport ===
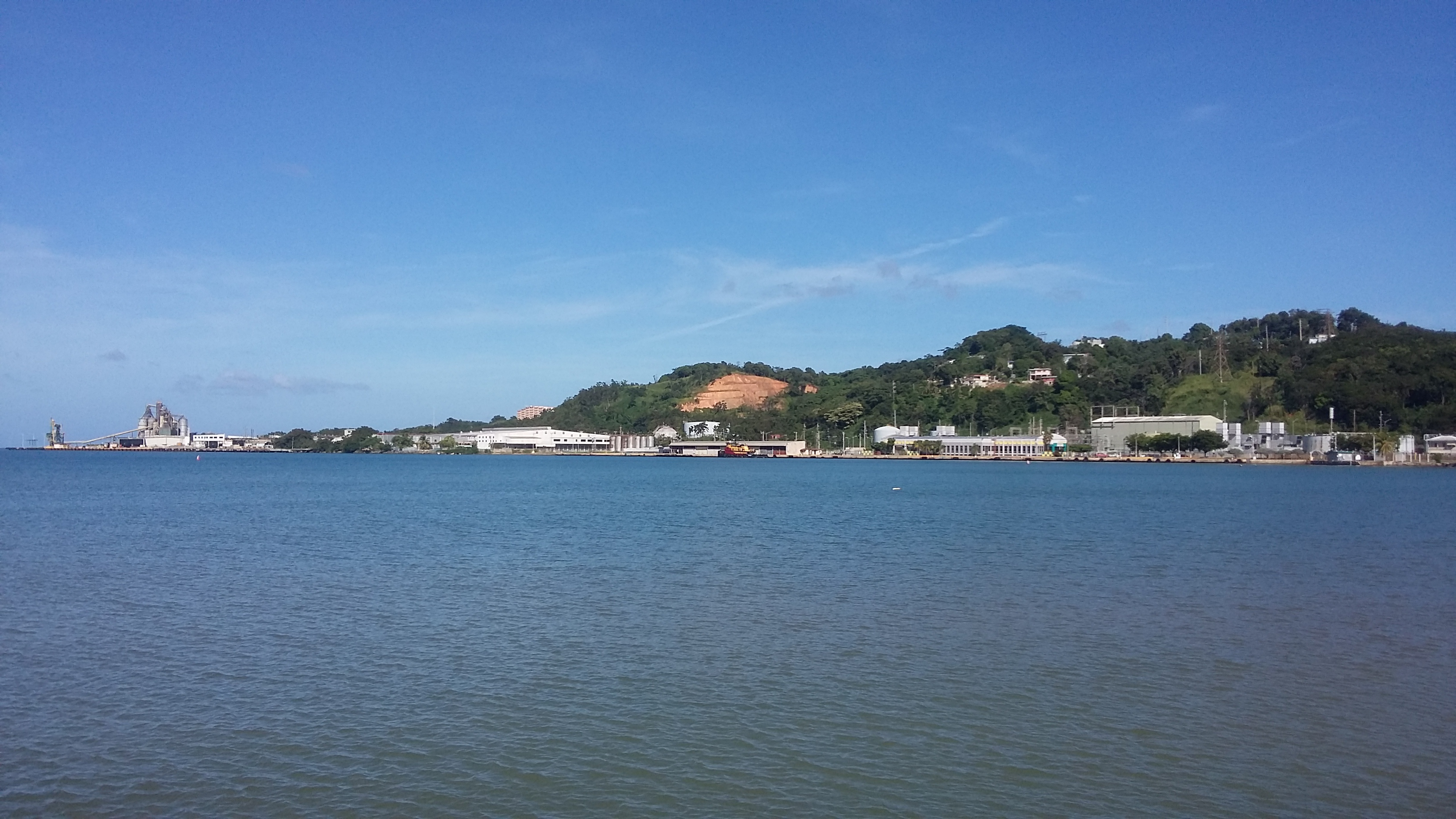
View of Mayagüez port from Ferry terminal to silos pier

The Port of Mayagüez is the third busiest port in Puerto Rico. It was base for several years to several tuna and fish companies who made the port a considerable busy one. It was normal to see 3 to 4 ships docked at any given day but due to the Section 936 termination the industries started to leave until 2000 approximately when only the ferry and the Federacion de Industria Agropecuaria silos pier were left. It is located northwest of the central business district along Puerto Rico routes 64, 341, and 3341, and stretches for 3.8 miles (6.1 km) along the coast. Its main canal is 0.4 miles (0.64 km) wide and its depth ranges from 47 to 120 feet (14 to 37 m), the water's depth along the piers ranges between 28 and 29 feet (8.5 and 8.8 m). The port is protected from rough seas by reefs which run along its northern and western sections.

On March 16, 2011, a new ferry service to the Dominican Republic was launched by America Cruise Ferries. Late 2016 the municipal administration awarded an administration contract to a private company after years of legal disputes and non-complying groups involved. The municipal administration had plans of development for the port back to 2004 when they received a portion of port area from the central government (the ferry pier and terminal) but 12 years later the port has seen little to no progress.

=== Airport ===
Mayagüez's airport, Eugenio María de Hostos Airport, also known as El Maní Airport, has had regular airline services for more than thirty years. It is located 4 miles (6.4 km) north of the central business district in the Sabanetas barrio. Before being inaugurated in 1955, the airport served as a military base. In the 1970s it had domestic service from Prinair, then from American Eagle and Eastern Air Lines's regional carrier Eastern Metro Express in the 1980s. After Eastern went bankrupt in 1991, American Eagle remained the only airline serving the airport until it ended service to the city on April 30, 2005, due to poor loads. For a while, Fina Air served flights to the Dominican Republic before the airline went bankrupt. Cape Air currently serves the airport with five daily flights to San Juan during the high season and three daily flights during the low season.

== Notable people ==
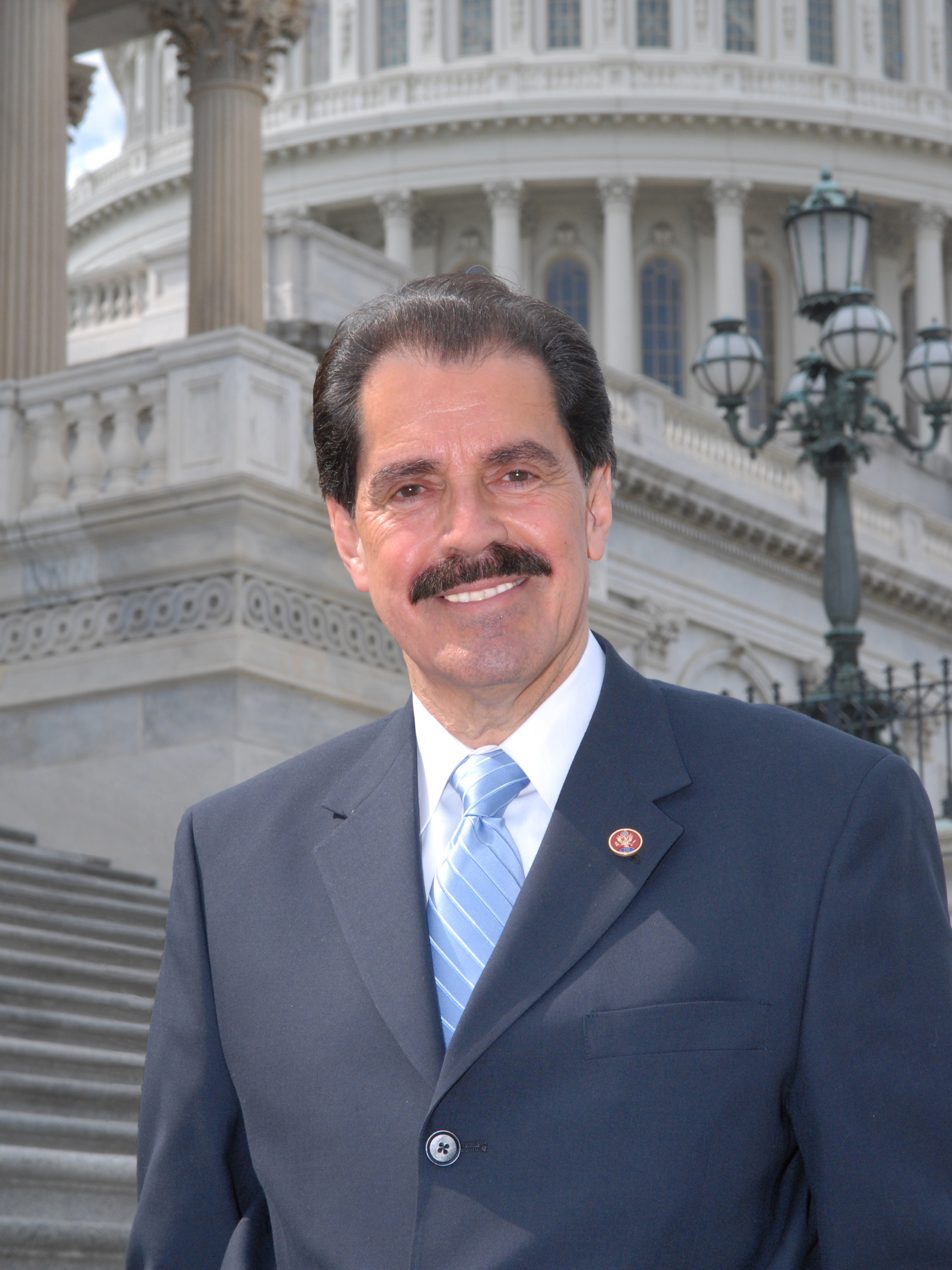
Congressman José Serrano

- Wilkins – Is a Puerto Rican pop music singer and composer.
- Maria Arrillaga – is a Puerto Rican poet who has been a professor at the University of Puerto Rico.
- María Luisa Arcelay
- J. J. Barea – former professional basketball player for the Dallas Mavericks and Minnesota Timberwolves
- Lucy Boscana – actress and a pioneer in Puerto Rico's television industry.
- Baudilio Vega Berríos
- Antonio Duvergé – was a Dominican general of French origin who served in the Dominican War of Independence.
- Carlos Vargas Ferrer
- Eugenio María de Hostos – a Puerto Rican educator, philosopher, intellectual, lawyer, sociologist, novelist, and Puerto Rican independence advocate.
- Keylla Hernández
- Gina Lynn – Hall of fame Puerto Rican former pornographic actress, model, and stripper.
- Alicia Moreda – a soap opera actress, comedian, and a pioneer in Puerto Rico's television industry.
- Olga A. Méndez
- Hernán Padilla
- Frankie Ruiz – was an American salsa singer and songwriter. He was a major figure in the salsa romántica era of 80's, 90's.
- Noemí Ruiz
- Roberto Roena
- Roberto Sanchez Vilella
- José E. Serrano, U.S. Congressman, 1990 to 2021
- Kobbo Santarrosa
- Martín Travieso
- Rawy Torres – Puerto Rican singer, composer, and guitarist, who was a member of the boy band Menudo
- Madeline Willemsen

== International relations ==
Mayagüez serves as a host city for two foreign consulates with business in Puerto Rico:

- Dominican Republic
- Hungary (Honorary Consulate)

=== Sister cities ===
- Quiroga, Michoacán, Mexico
- Cartagena, Colombia

== Book ==
- Gaudier, Martín, Genealogías, Biografías e Historia del Mayagüez de Ayer y Hoy y Antología de Puerto Rico, 1957.

== See also ==
- Timeline of Mayagüez, Puerto Rico
- Territories of the United States
- List of Puerto Ricans
- History of Puerto Rico
- National Register of Historic Places listings in Mayagüez, Puerto Rico
- Did you know-Puerto Rico?
