= Mayagüez Arriba =

Barrio of Mayagüez, Puerto Rico

- Barrio
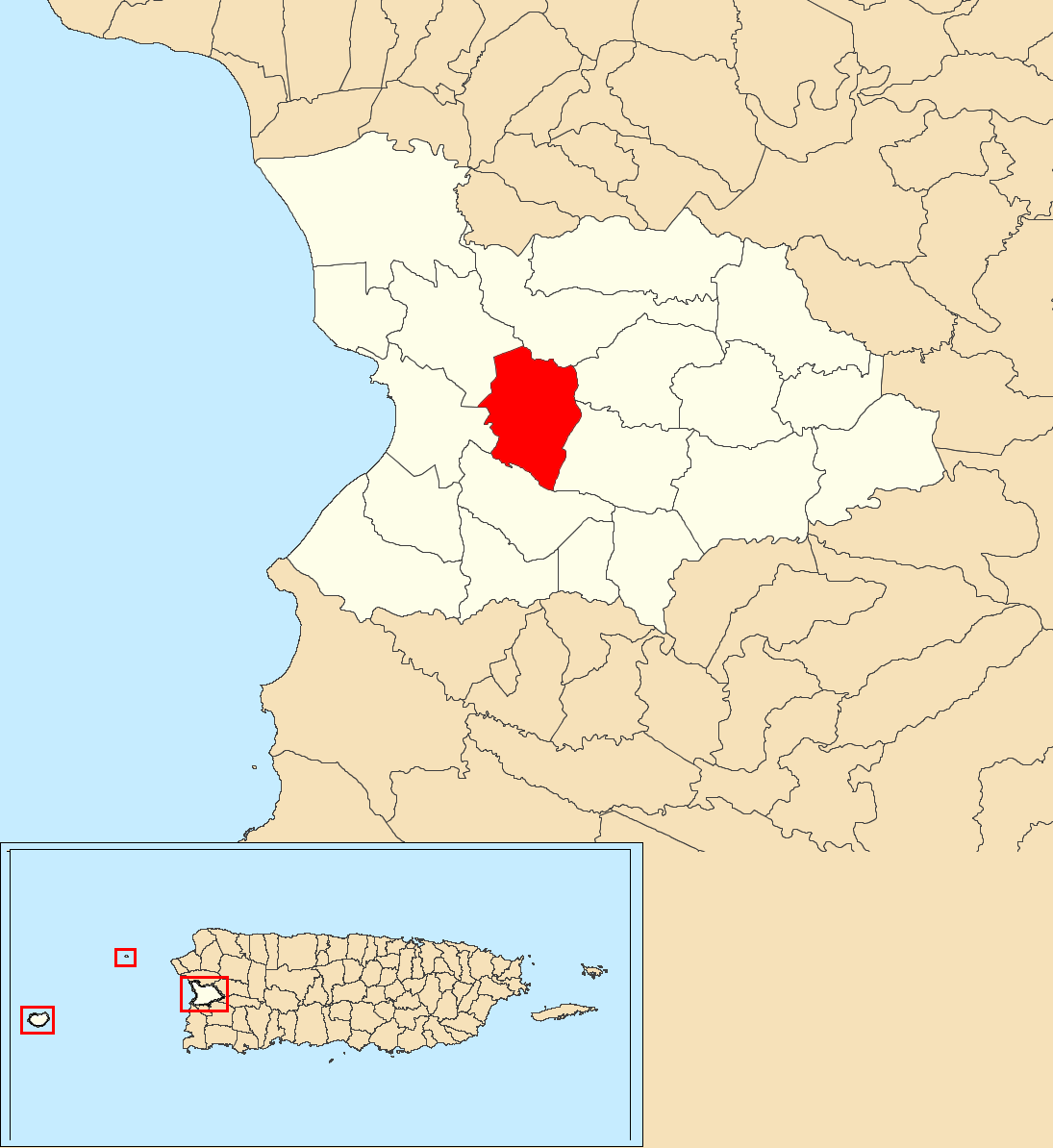
- Location of Mayagüez Arriba within the municipality of Mayagüez shown in red

- Location of Puerto Rico
- Coordinates: 18°12′19″N 67°07′15″W
- Commonwealth: Puerto Rico
- Municipality: Mayagüez

Area
  - Total: 2.58 sq mi (6.7 km^{2})
  - Land: 2.58 sq mi (6.7 km^{2})
  - Water: 0 sq mi (0 km^{2})
- Elevation: 121 ft (37 m)

Population (2010)
  - Total: 5,341
  - Density: 2,078.2/sq mi (802.4/km^{2})
- Source: 2010 Census
- Time zone: UTC−4 (AST)

Mayagüez Arriba is a barrio in the municipality of Mayagüez, Puerto Rico. Its population in 2010 was 5,341.

== History ==
Mayagüez Arriba was in Spain's gazetteers until Puerto Rico was ceded by Spain in the aftermath of the Spanish–American War under the terms of the Treaty of Paris of 1898 and became an unincorporated territory of the United States. In 1899, the United States Department of War conducted a census of Puerto Rico finding that the population of Mayagüez Arriba barrio was 2,187.

Historical population
Census	Pop.	Note	%±
1900	2,187		—
1910	3,157		44.4%
1920	2,616		−17.1%
1930	2,590		−1.0%
1940	2,588		−0.1%
1950	4,915		89.9%
1960	5,596		13.9%
1970	6,055		8.2%
1980	5,811		−4.0%
1990	5,905		1.6%
2000	6,098		3.3%
2010	5,341		−12.4%
U.S. Decennial Census; 1899 (shown as 1900) 1910-1930; 1930-1950 1980-2000 2010

== See also ==
- List of communities in Puerto Rico
