= Quebrada Grande, Mayagüez, Puerto Rico =

Barrio of Puerto Rico

Quebrada Grande
- Barrio
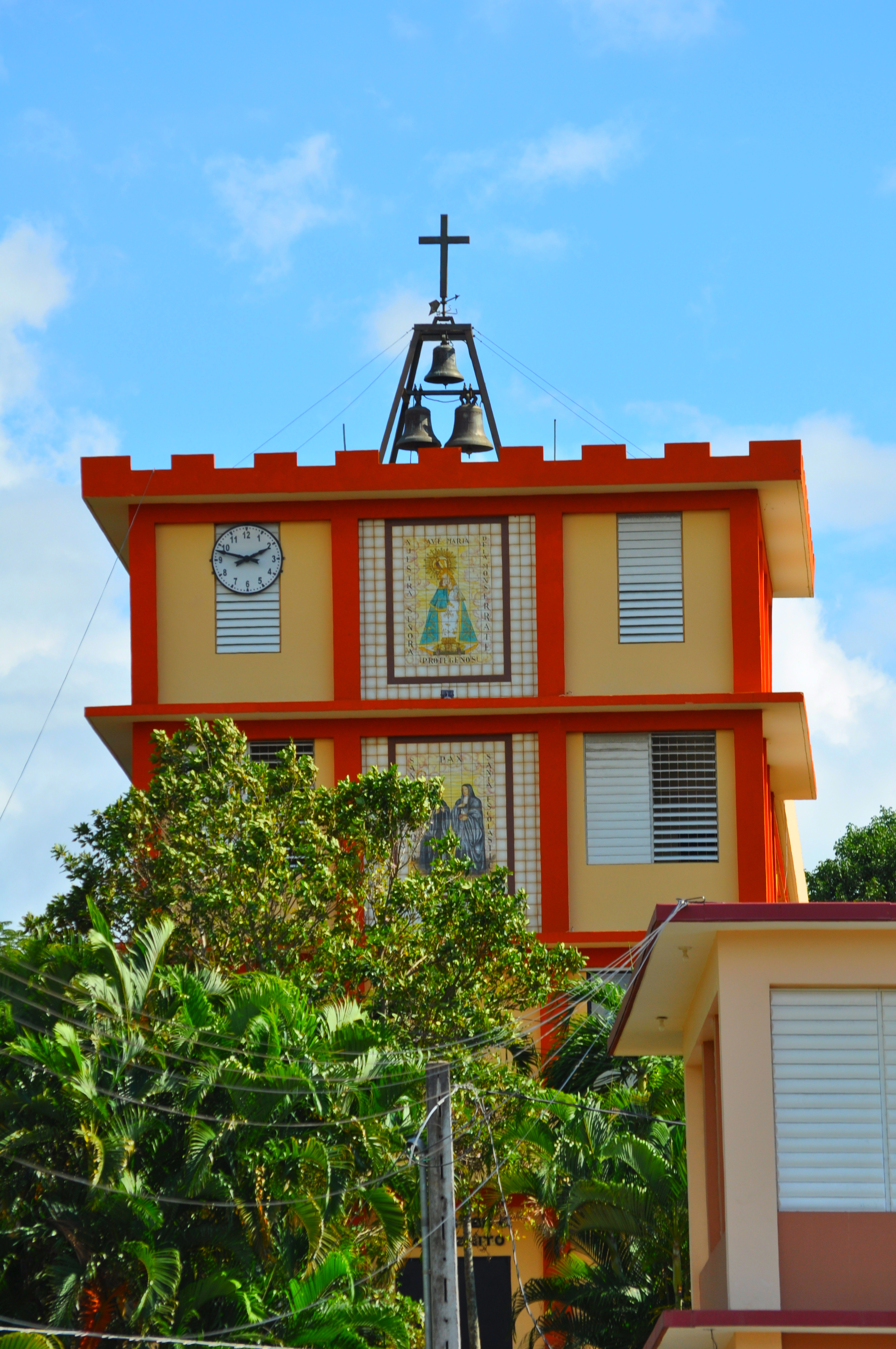
- Church at Colegio San Benito in Quebrada Grande

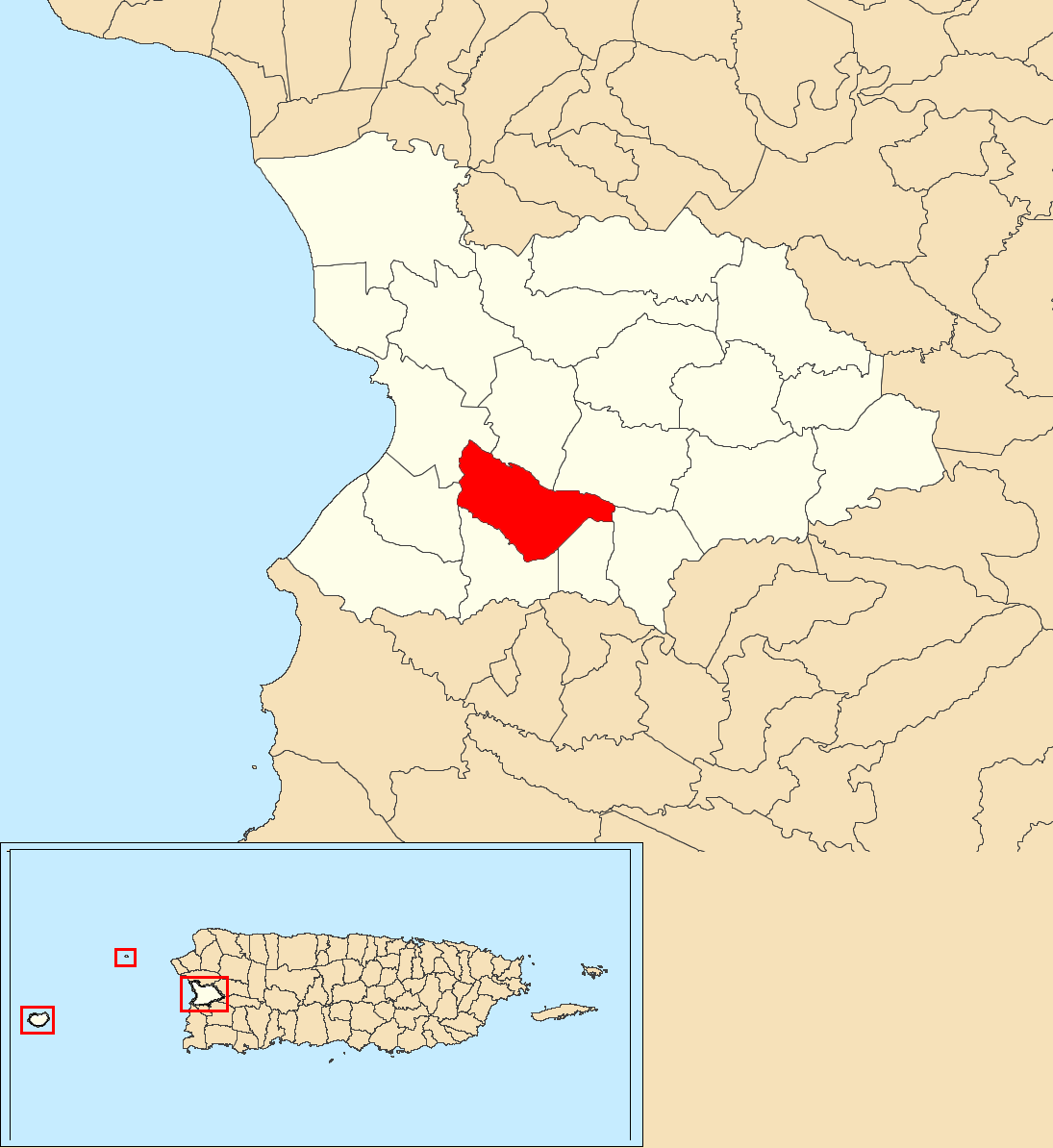
- Location of Quebrada Grande within the municipality of Mayagüez shown in red

- Location of Puerto Rico
- Coordinates: 18°10′54″N 67°07′18″W
- Commonwealth: Puerto Rico
- Municipality: Mayagüez

Area
  - Total: 2.47 sq mi (6.4 km^{2})
  - Land: 2.47 sq mi (6.4 km^{2})
  - Water: 0 sq mi (0 km^{2})
- Elevation: 295 ft (90 m)

Population (2010)
  - Total: 5,558
  - Density: 2,250.2/sq mi (868.8/km^{2})
- Source: 2010 Census
- Time zone: UTC−4 (AST)

Quebrada Grande is a barrio in the municipality of Mayagüez, Puerto Rico. Its population in 2010 was 5,558.

== History ==
Quebrada Grande was in Spain's gazetteers until Puerto Rico was ceded by Spain in the aftermath of the Spanish–American War under the terms of the Treaty of Paris of 1898 and became an unincorporated territory of the United States. In 1899, the United States Department of War conducted a census of Puerto Rico finding that the population of Quebrada Grande barrio was 1,035.

Historical population
Census	Pop.	Note	%±
1900	1,035		—
1910	1,135		9.7%
1920	1,425		25.6%
1930	1,466		2.9%
1940	2,052		40.0%
1950	2,465		20.1%
1960	2,788		13.1%
1970	3,772		35.3%
1980	4,579		21.4%
1990	5,882		28.5%
2000	6,333		7.7%
2010	5,558		−12.2%
U.S. Decennial Census; 1899 (shown as 1900) 1910-1930; 1930-1950 1980-2000 2010

== See also ==
- List of communities in Puerto Rico
