= Juan Alonso, Mayagüez, Puerto Rico =

Barrio of Puerto Rico

Juan Alonso
- Barrio
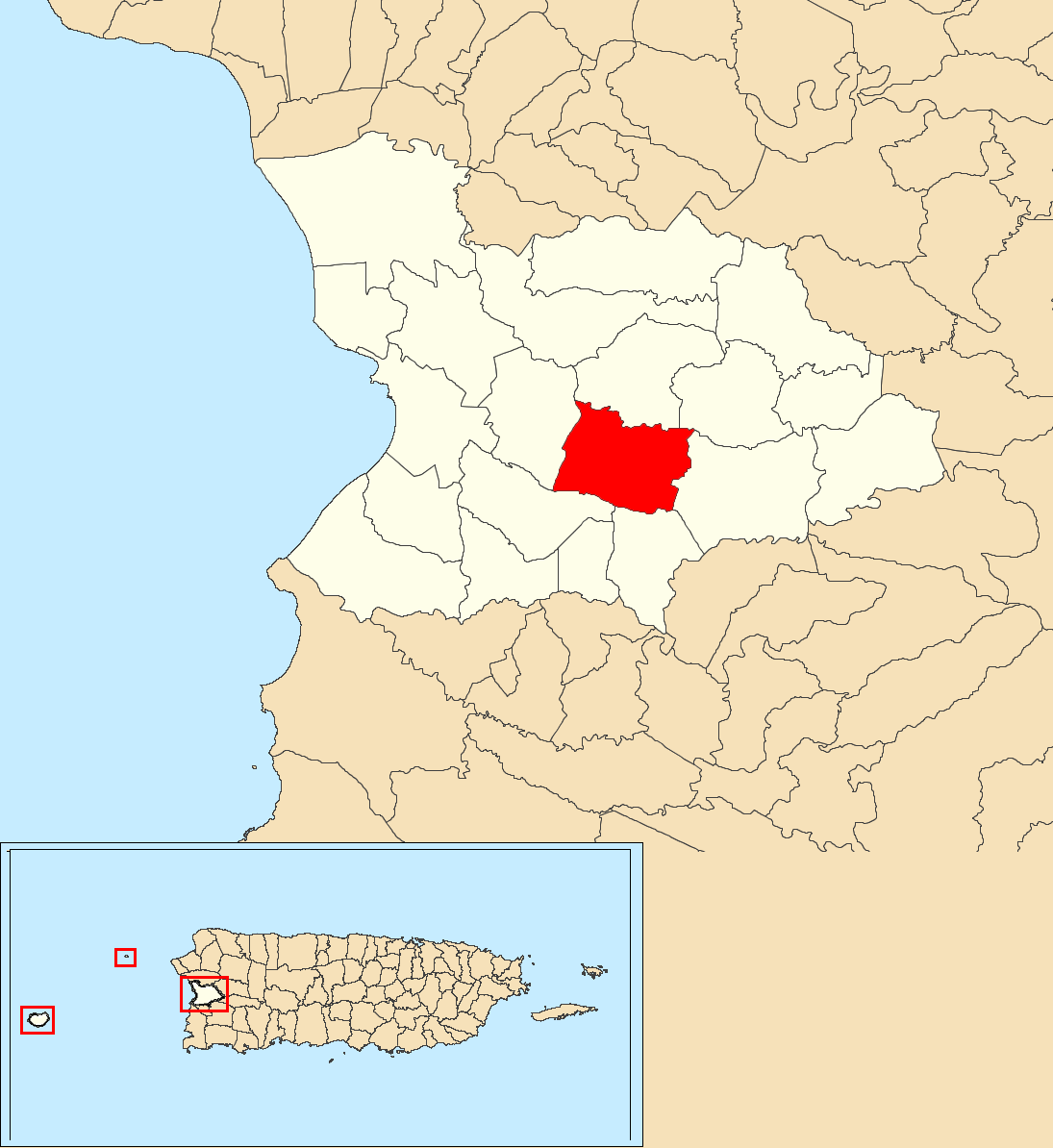
- Location of Juan Alonso within the municipality of Mayagüez shown in red

- Location of Puerto Rico
- Coordinates: 18°11′33″N 67°05′55″W
- Commonwealth: Puerto Rico
- Municipality: Mayagüez

Area
  - Total: 2.79 sq mi (7.2 km^{2})
  - Land: 2.79 sq mi (7.2 km^{2})
  - Water: 0 sq mi (0 km^{2})
- Elevation: 627 ft (191 m)

Population (2010)
  - Total: 1,158
  - Density: 415.1/sq mi (160.3/km^{2})
- Source: 2010 Census
- Time zone: UTC−4 (AST)

Juan Alonso is a barrio in the municipality of Mayagüez, Puerto Rico. Its population in 2010 was 1,158.

== History ==
Juan Alonso was in Spain's gazetteers until Puerto Rico was ceded by Spain in the aftermath of the Spanish–American War under the terms of the Treaty of Paris of 1898 and became an unincorporated territory of the United States. In 1899, the United States Department of War conducted a census of Puerto Rico finding that the population of Juan Alonso barrio was 1,041.

Historical population
Census	Pop.	Note	%±
1900	1,041		—
1910	879		−15.6%
1920	747		−15.0%
1930	696		−6.8%
1940	792		13.8%
1950	723		−8.7%
1960	730		1.0%
1970	1,066		46.0%
1980	1,222		14.6%
1990	1,482		21.3%
2000	1,371		−7.5%
2010	1,158		−15.5%
U.S. Decennial Census; 1899 (shown as 1900) 1910-1930; 1930-1950 1980-2000 2010

== See also ==
- List of communities in Puerto Rico
