= Malezas =

Barrio of Mayagüez, Puerto Rico

- Barrio
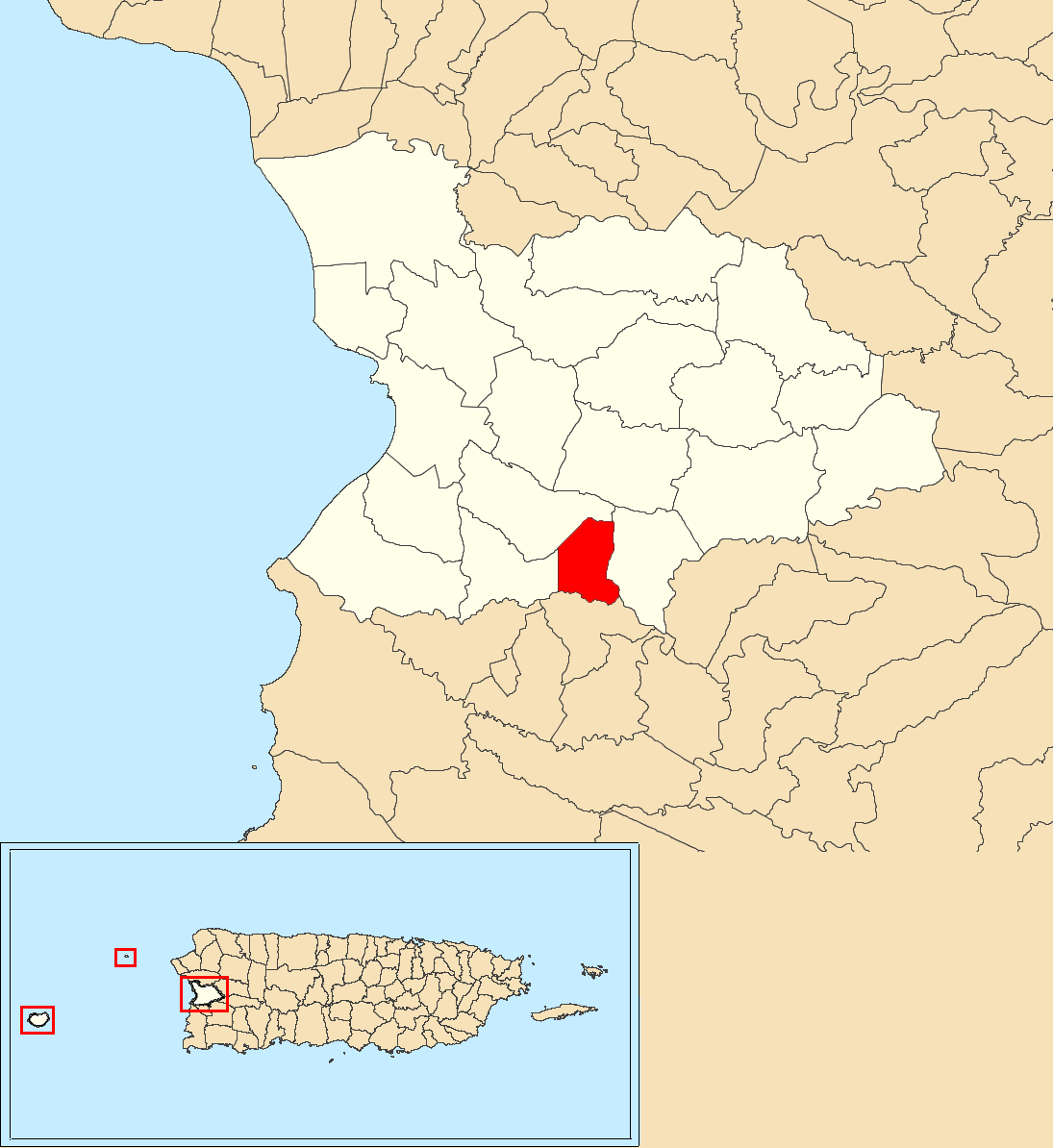
- Location of Malezas within the municipality of Mayagüez shown in red

- Location of Puerto Rico
- Coordinates: 18°10′02″N 67°06′20″W
- Commonwealth: Puerto Rico
- Municipality: Mayagüez

Area
  - Total: 1.06 sq mi (2.7 km^{2})
  - Land: 1.06 sq mi (2.7 km^{2})
  - Water: 0 sq mi (0 km^{2})
- Elevation: 335 ft (102 m)

Population (2010)
  - Total: 1,072
  - Density: 1,011.3/sq mi (390.5/km^{2})
- Source: 2010 Census
- Time zone: UTC−4 (AST)

Malezas is a barrio in the municipality of Mayagüez, Puerto Rico. Its population in 2010 was 1,072.

== History ==
Malezas was in Spain's gazetteers until Puerto Rico was ceded by Spain in the aftermath of the Spanish–American War under the terms of the Treaty of Paris of 1898 and became an unincorporated territory of the United States. In 1899, the United States Department of War conducted a census of Puerto Rico finding that the combined population of Malezas barrio and Río Hondo barrio was 1,072.

Historical population
Census	Pop.	Note	%±
1910	443		—
1920	472		6.5%
1930	462		−2.1%
1940	545		18.0%
1950	604		10.8%
1960	622		3.0%
1970	941		51.3%
1980	959		1.9%
1990	682		−28.9%
2000	1,143		67.6%
2010	1,072		−6.2%
U.S. Decennial Census; 1900 (N/A) 1910-1930; 1930-1950 1980-2000 2010

== See also ==
- List of communities in Puerto Rico
