= Naranjales, Mayagüez, Puerto Rico =

Barrio of Puerto Rico

Naranjales
- Barrio
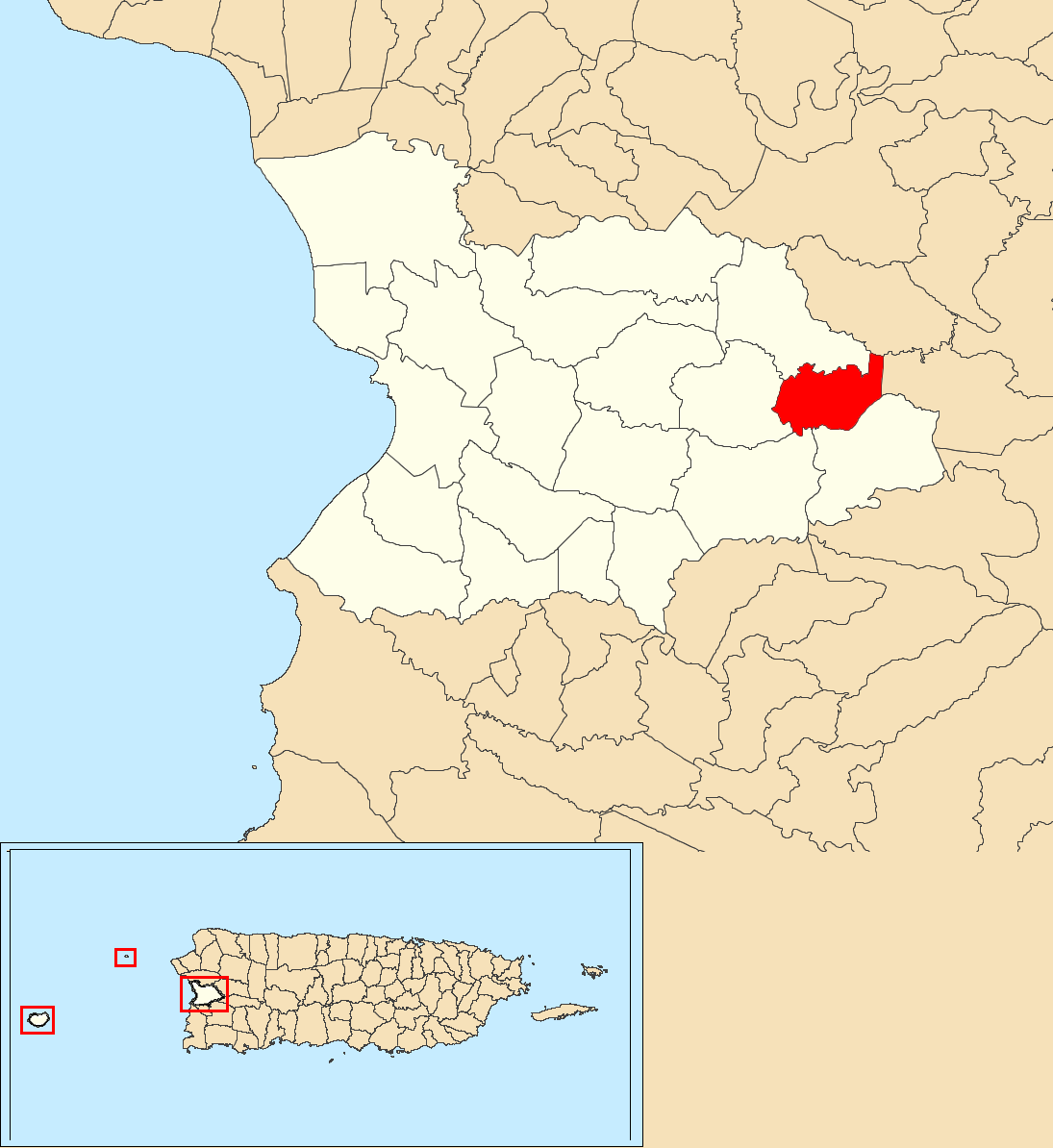
- Location of Naranjales within the municipality of Mayagüez shown in red

- Location of Puerto Rico
- Coordinates: 18°12′20″N 67°02′32″W
- Commonwealth: Puerto Rico
- Municipality: Mayagüez

Area
  - Total: 1.53 sq mi (4.0 km^{2})
  - Land: 1.53 sq mi (4.0 km^{2})
  - Water: 0 sq mi (0 km^{2})
- Elevation: 1,099 ft (335 m)

Population (2010)
  - Total: 1,109
  - Density: 724.8/sq mi (279.8/km^{2})
- Source: 2010 Census
- Time zone: UTC−4 (AST)

Naranjales (Naranjales barrio) is a barrio in the municipality of Mayagüez, Puerto Rico. Its population in 2010 was 1,109.

== History ==
Naranjales was in Spain's gazetteers until Puerto Rico was ceded by Spain in the aftermath of the Spanish–American War under the terms of the Treaty of Paris of 1898 and became an unincorporated territory of the United States. In 1899, the United States Department of War conducted a census of Puerto Rico finding that the combined population of Naranjales barrio and Río Cañas Arriba barrio was 1,048.

Historical population
| Census | Pop. | Note | %± |
|---|---|---|---|
| 1910 | 418 | | — |
| 1920 | 351 | | −16.0% |
| 1930 | 222 | | −36.8% |
| 1940 | 496 | | 123.4% |
| 1950 | 575 | | 15.9% |
| 1960 | 518 | | −9.9% |
| 1970 | 566 | | 9.3% |
| 1980 | 576 | | 1.8% |
| 1990 | 1,039 | | 80.4% |
| 2000 | 1,197 | | 15.2% |
| 2010 | 1,109 | | −7.4% |
U.S. Decennial Census; 1900 (N/A) 1910-1930; 1930-1950 1980-2000 2010

== See also ==
- List of communities in Puerto Rico
