= Puerto Rico Highway 105 =

Highway in Puerto Rico

Highway 105
- Ruta 105

Route information
- Maintained by Puerto Rico DTPW
- Length: 43.4 km (27.0 mi)

Major junctions
- West end: Calle Tamarindo in Mayagüez barrio-pueblo
- PR-339 in Limón; PR-119 / PR-357 in Montoso; PR-119 in Montoso; PR-120 in Maricao Afuera; PR-357 in Maricao Afuera–Maricao barrio-pueblo; PR-120 in Maricao barrio-pueblo; PR-425 in Indiera Fría; PR-4409 in Bucarabones; PR-426 in Indiera Alta–Indiera Baja; PR-365 in Indiera Alta–Indiera Baja–Rubias
- East end: PR-128 in Indiera Alta

Location
- Country: United States
- Territory: Puerto Rico
- Municipalities: Mayagüez, Maricao, Yauco

Highway system
- Roads in Puerto Rico; List
| ← PR-104 | → PR-106 |

Puerto Rico Highway 105 (PR-105) is a road that travels from Mayagüez, Puerto Rico to Maricao. It begins at its intersection with PR-239 (former PR-2R) in downtown Mayagüez and ends at its junction with PR-128 in eastern Maricao, close to Yauco municipal limit.

== Major intersections ==
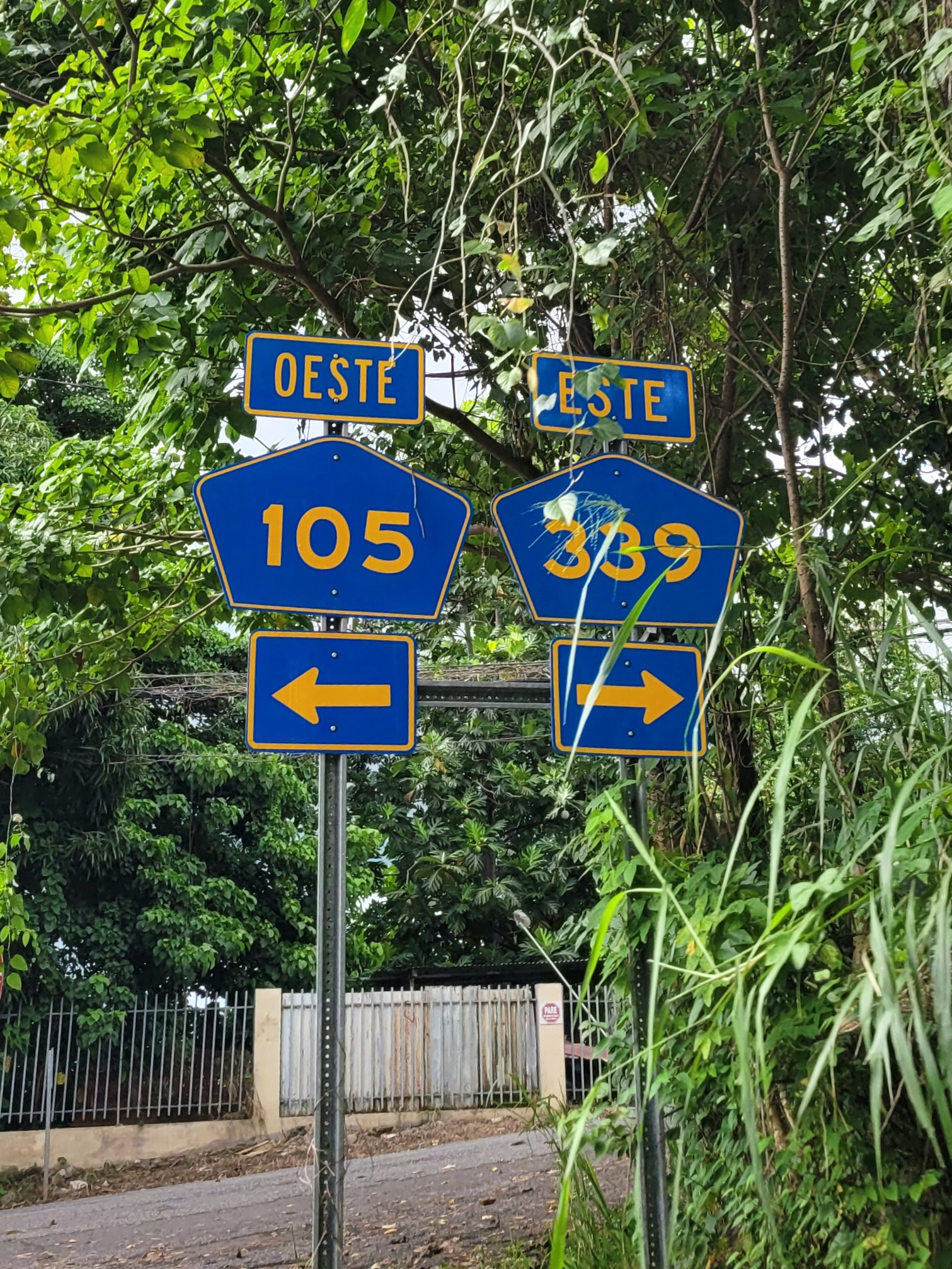
PR-105 west at PR-339 junction in Limón, Mayagüez

| Municipality | Location | km | mi | Destinations | Notes |
|---|---|---|---|---|---|
| Mayagüez | Mayagüez barrio-pueblo | 0.0 | 0.0 | PR-Calle Tamarindo – Mayagüez | Western terminus of PR-105 and the Ruta Panorámica |
| Mayagüez | Limón | 9.6 | 6.0 | PR-339 east (Ruta Panorámica) – Limón | Eastern terminus of the Ruta Panorámica concurrency; the Ruta Panorámica continues toward Las Marías |
| Mayagüez | Montoso | 15.6 | 9.7 | PR-119 north / PR-357 east – Las Marías, Maricao | Northern terminus of PR-119 concurrency |
| Maricao | Montoso | 17.4 | 10.8 | PR-119 – San Germán | Southern terminus of PR-119 concurrency |
| Maricao | Maricao Afuera | 23.1 | 14.4 | PR-120 south (Ruta Panorámica) – Sabana Grande | Western terminus of PR-120 and the Ruta Panorámica concurrencies; the Ruta Panorámica continues toward San Germán |
| Maricao | Maricao Afuera–Maricao barrio-pueblo line | 24.4 | 15.2 | PR-357 west (Avenida Pedro Albizu Campos) – Mayagüez | |
| Maricao | Maricao Afuera–Maricao barrio-pueblo line | 24.5 | 15.2 | PR-410 (Calle Celis Aguilera) – Maricao | |
| Maricao | Maricao barrio-pueblo | 24.7 | 15.3 | PR-120 north (Avenida Luchetti) – Las Marías | Eastern terminus of PR-120 and the Ruta Panorámica concurrencies |
| Maricao | Río Bonelli | 28.6– 28.7 | 17.8– 17.8 | Puente Orama | |
| Maricao | Indiera Fría | 28.7 | 17.8 | PR-425 – Indiera Fría | |
| Maricao | Río Guabá | 29.0– 29.1 | 18.0– 18.1 | Puente del Río Guabá | |
| Maricao | Bucarabones | 32.3 | 20.1 | PR-4409 north – Bucarabones | |
| Maricao | Indiera Alta–Indiera Baja line | 41.0 | 25.5 | PR-426 – Indiera Baja | |
| Maricao–Yauco municipal line | Indiera Alta–Indiera Baja– Rubias tripoint | 42.7 | 26.5 | PR-365 (Ruta Panorámica) – Indiera Baja | Western terminus of the Ruta Panorámica concurrency; the Ruta Panorámica continues toward Yauco |
| Maricao | Indiera Alta | 43.4 | 27.0 | PR-128 – Yauco, Lares | Eastern terminus of PR-105; eastern terminus of the Ruta Panorámica concurrency; the Ruta Panorámica continues toward Lares |
1.000 mi = 1.609 km; 1.000 km = 0.621 mi: Concurrency terminus
