= Bucarabones =

Bucarabones may refer to:

== Places ==
- Bucarabones, Las Marías, Puerto Rico, a barrio
- Bucarabones, Maricao, Puerto Rico, a barrio
