= Montoso =

Montoso may refer to the following places:

- Montoso, Maricao, Puerto Rico, a barrio
- Montoso, Mayagüez, Puerto Rico, a barrio
