= Maricao, Puerto Rico =

Town and municipality in Puerto Rico

Maricao Municipio Autónomo de Maricao
- Town and Municipality
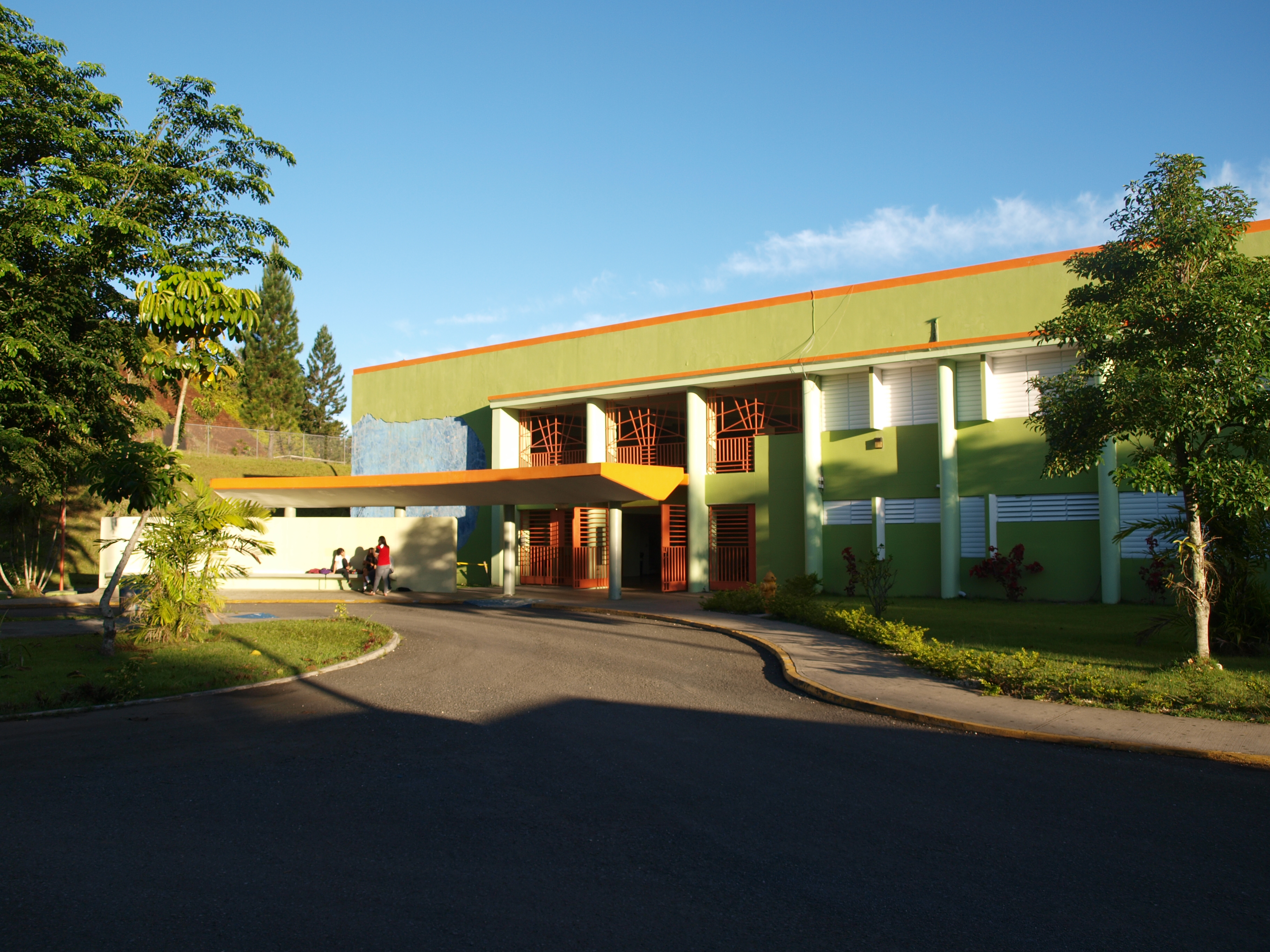
- Maricao High School

- Flag Coat of arms
- Nicknames: "Pueblo de las Indieras", "Ciudad del Monte del Estado", "Ciudad de Leyenda y Romance", "Tierra del Café"
- Anthem: "Sobre las verdes altura"
- Map of Puerto Rico highlighting Maricao Municipality
- Coordinates: 18°10′51″N 66°58′48″W
- Sovereign state: United States
- Commonwealth: Puerto Rico
- Settled: 1848
- Founded: April 10, 1874
- Barrios: 7 barrios: Bucarabones; Indiera Alta; Indiera Baja; Indiera Fría; Maricao Afuera; Maricao barrio-pueblo; Montoso

Government
  - Mayor: Wilfredo (Juny) Ruiz (PPD)
  - Senatorial dist.: 5 - Ponce
  - Representative dist.: 21

Area
  - Total: 37.1 sq mi (96.0 km^{2})
  - Land: 37 sq mi (96 km^{2})
  - Water: 0 sq mi (0 km^{2})

Population (2020)
  - Total: 4,755
  - Estimate (2025): 4,336 ▼
  - Rank: 77th in Puerto Rico
  - Density: 130/sq mi (50/km^{2})
- Demonym: Maricaeños
- Time zone: UTC−4 (AST)
- ZIP Code: 00606
- Area code: 787/939

Maricao (Spanish pronunciation: [maɾiˈkao]) is a town and the second-least populous municipality of Puerto Rico; it is located at the western edge of the Cordillera Central. It is a small town set around a small square in hilly terrain, north of San Germán, Sabana Grande and Yauco; south of Las Marías and Lares, southeast of Mayagüez, and west of Adjuntas. Maricao has 7 barrios including Maricao Pueblo (the downtown area and the administrative center of the city).

The town borders the Maricao Fish Hatchery, a fish hatchery made up of tanks and pools in a garden setting, where some 25,000 fish are raised yearly to stock farm fishponds and island lakes. The hatchery is part of the Maricao State Forest, also known as Monte del Estado. Though of dryer vegetation than the other mountain forest, Maricao is home to large number of bird species. Its stone observation tower provides far-flung views to the coast and the Mona Passage.

Maricao has a 2020 census population of 4,455.

== History ==
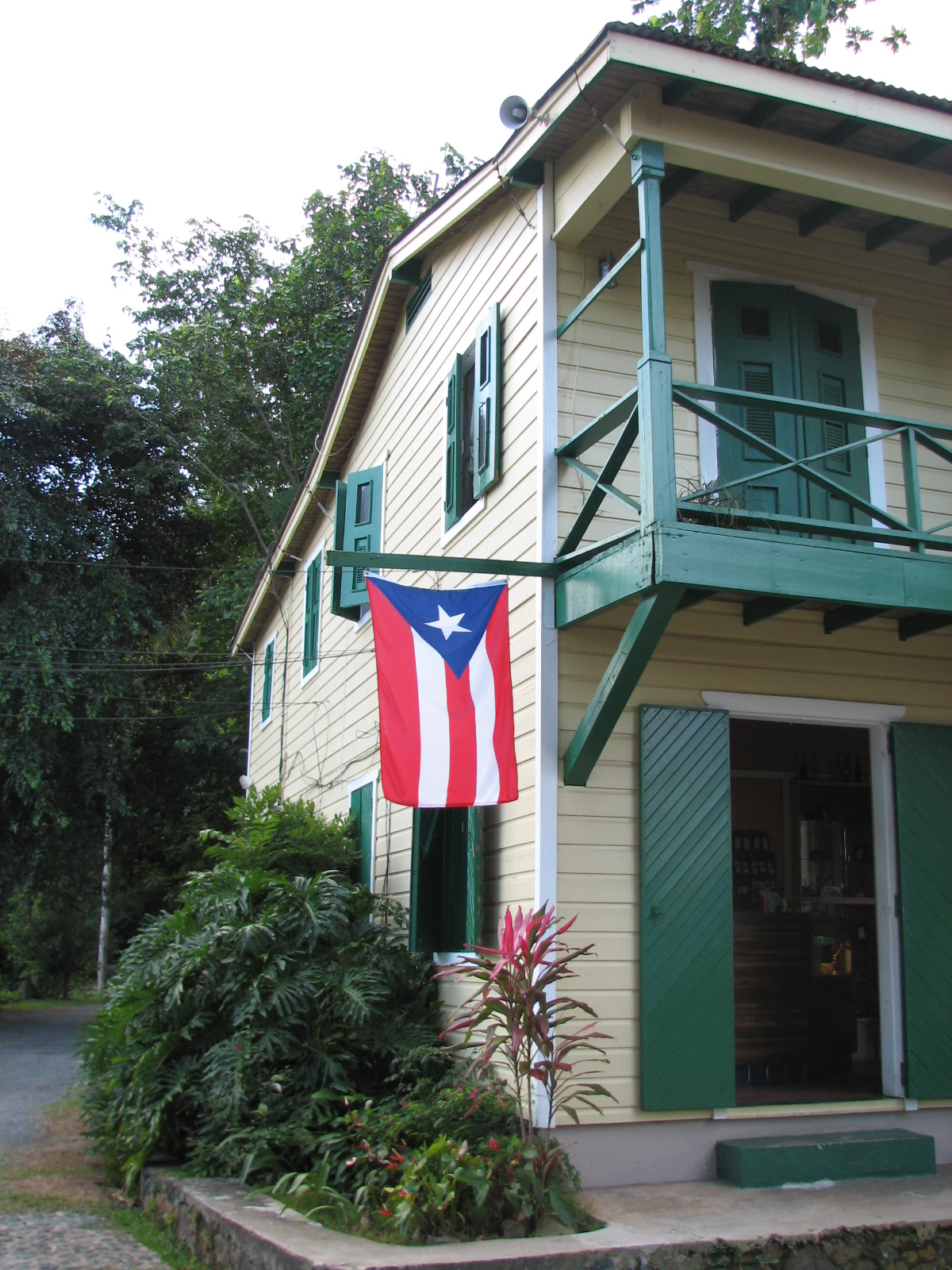
Hacienda Juanita in Maricao

Maricao was founded on April 1, 1874, when Bernardo Collado, Julián Ayala, Francisco M. Sojo, Napoleón Pietri and Leoncio S. Martínez requested the Provincial Deputation authorization to establish an official town. It originally belonged to the district of San Germán, but they alleged the roads were too long and almost impassable. Their request made references to a parish already established in 1866.

During the 19th century coffee boom, Maricao and other regions surged economically. When the spurt of coffee in the island ended by the start of the 20th century, the economic conditions deteriorated again. Many of the old plantation houses have been turned into museums to stimulate the tourism industry. While Puerto Rico still has a niche in the gourmet coffee market, the large scale coffee growing which built Maricao is no longer economically feasible.

Puerto Rico was ceded by Spain in the aftermath of the Spanish–American War under the terms of the Treaty of Paris of 1898 and became a colony of the United States. In 1899, the United States Department of War conducted a census of Puerto Rico finding that the population of Maricao was 8,312.

On September 20, 2017 Hurricane Maria struck Puerto Rico. Several major landslides covered roads into Maricao. Highways and bridges were washed away by flooding rivers. Residents were left incommunicado. In some areas of Maricao there were more than 25 landslides per square mile. Elderly were especially affected.

== Geography ==
Maricao is mountainous and rugged and belongs to the Western portion of the Cordillera Central. The highest point in the municipality is an unnamed summit located at 3,260 feet (994 m) west of Monte Membrillo, at the municipal boundary with Yauco. The highest and most prominent peaks include Las Tetas de Cerro Gordo (2,986 ft / 910 m) and Alto del Descanso (2,518 ft / 767 m), both located in Monte del Estado.

=== Barrios ===
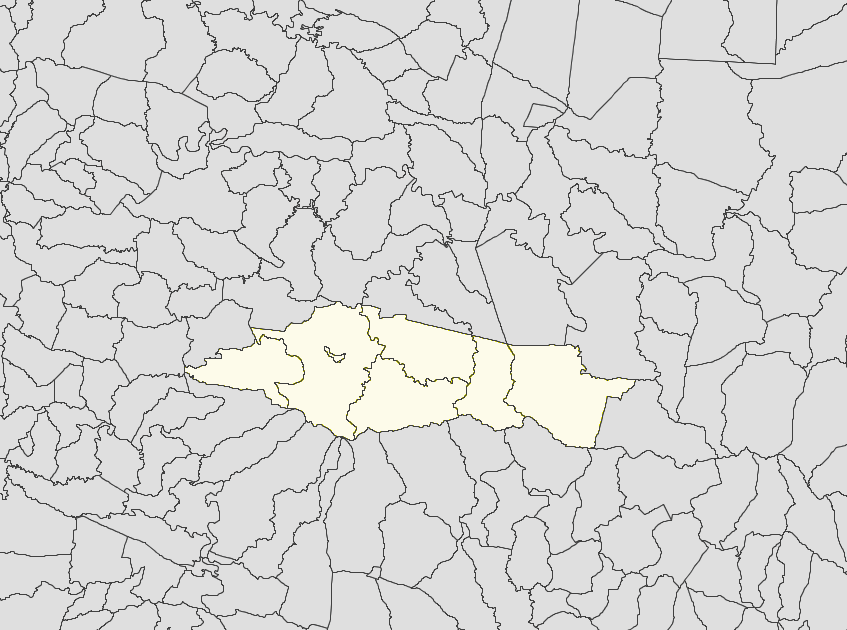
Subdivisions of Maricao.

Like all municipalities of Puerto Rico, Maricao is subdivided into barrios. The municipal buildings, central square and large Catholic church are located in a barrio referred to as "el pueblo".

1. Bucarabones
2. Indiera Alta
3. Indiera Baja
4. Indiera Fría
5. Maricao Afuera
6. Maricao barrio-pueblo
7. Montoso

=== Sectors ===
Barrios (which are, in contemporary times, roughly comparable to minor civil divisions) and subbarrios, are further subdivided into smaller areas called sectores (sectors in English). The types of sectores may vary, from normally sector to urbanización to reparto to barriada to residencial, among others.

=== Special Communities ===
Comunidades Especiales de Puerto Rico (Special Communities of Puerto Rico) are marginalized communities whose citizens are experiencing a certain amount of social exclusion. A map shows these communities occur in nearly every municipality of the commonwealth. Of the 742 places that were on the list in 2014, the following barrios, communities, sectors, or neighborhoods were in Maricao: Llanadas, El 30 (Sector Los Mercados) in Indiera Alta, La Cuchilla, Los Cuadros-Montoso, and Villa Esperanza.

== Culture ==
=== Tourism ===
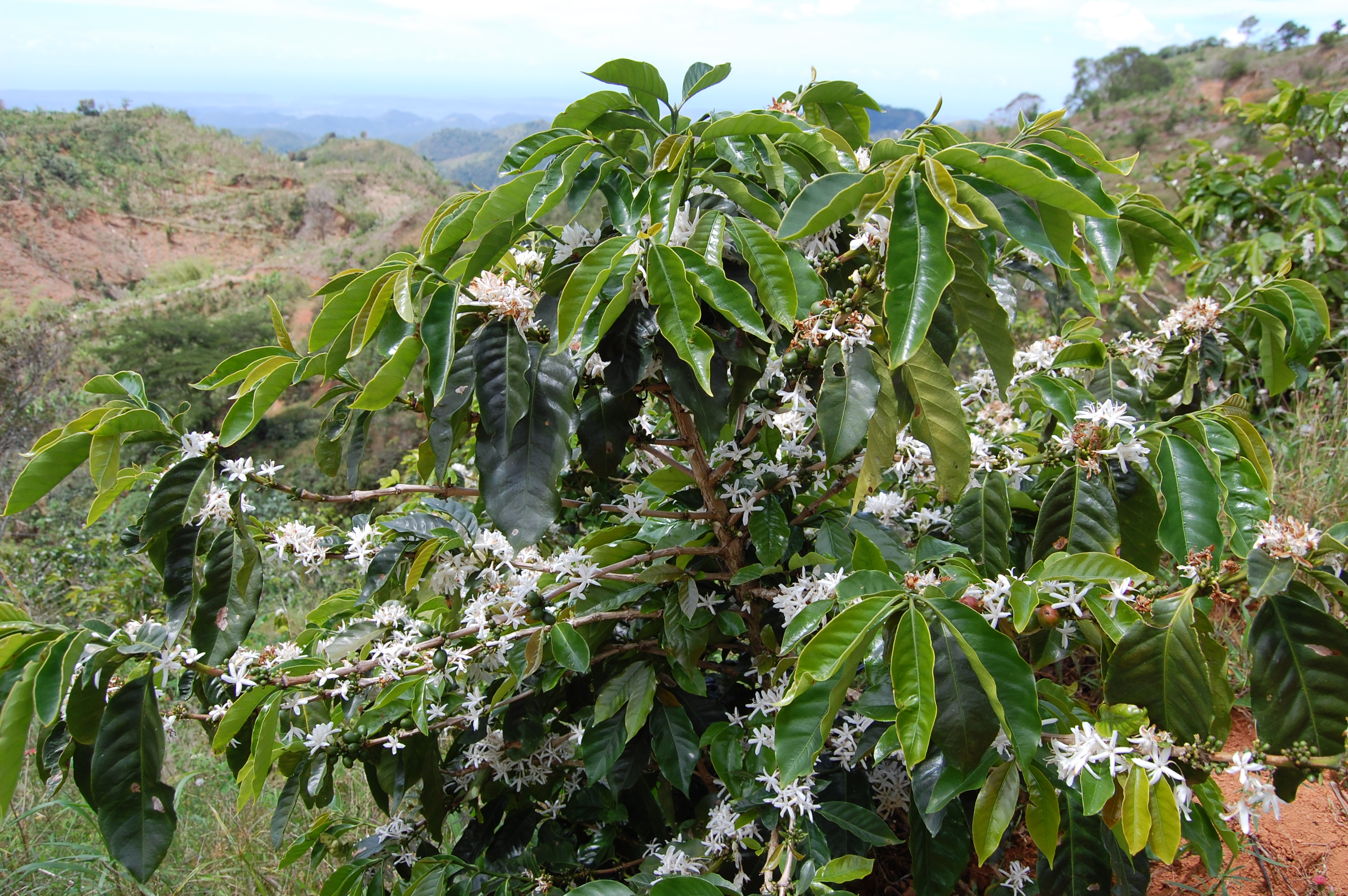
Coffee tree atop the Maricao mountains

Due to its importance as a coffee producer in the past, some of Maricao's coffee haciendas were turned into museums or guest houses: Hacienda Delicias and Hacienda Juanita, which has since closed. Other places for tourists to visit are the Bambúa Recreational Center and the Maricao Fish Nursery. Some natural spots to visit are the Monte del Estado forest reserve, the Maricao River Natural Protected Area, the Prieto Lake and the Salto de Curet waterfall.

=== Festivals and events ===
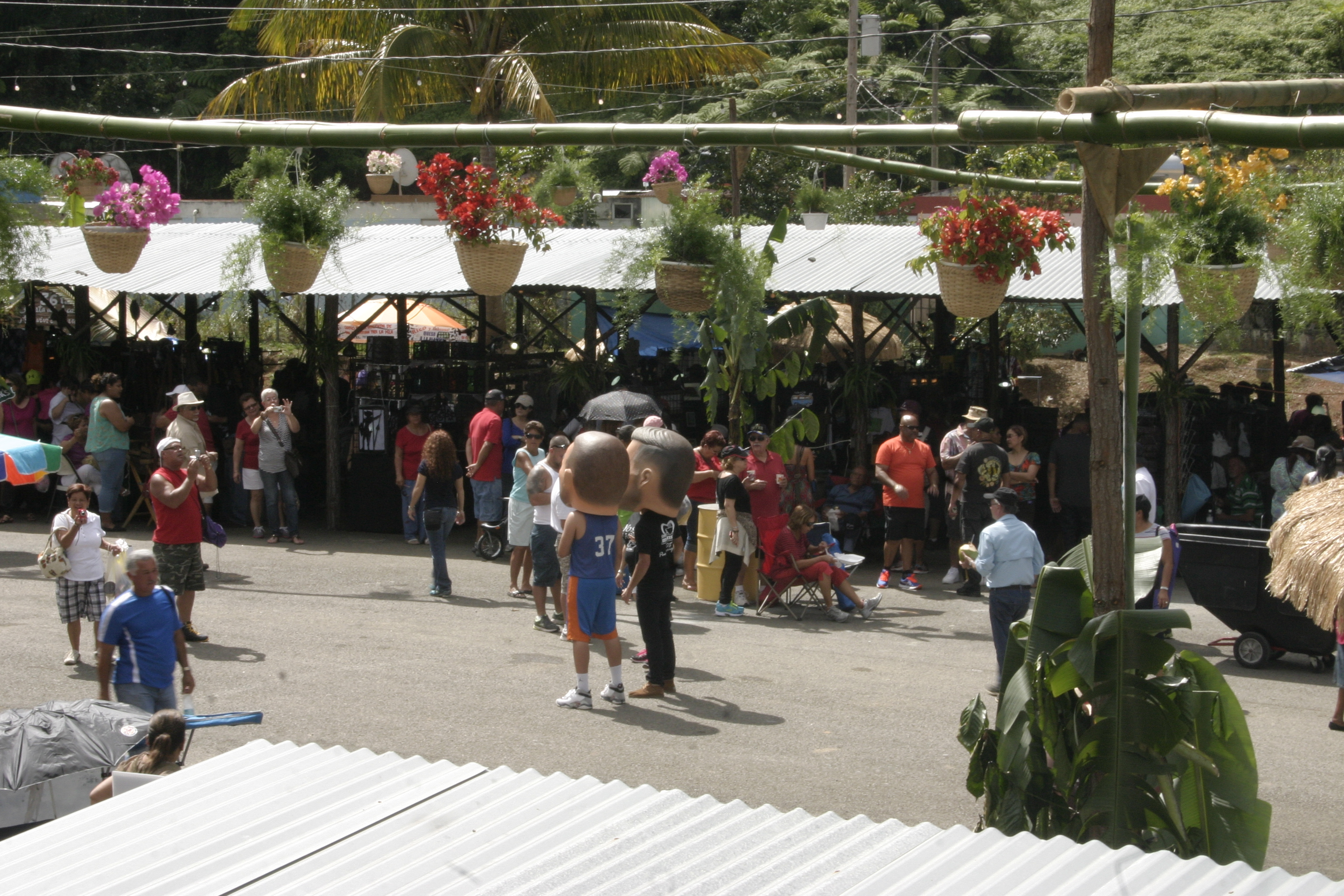
Fiesta del Acabe del Café in Maricao in 2014

Maricao celebrates its patron saint festival in June. The Fiestas Patronales de San Juan Bautista is a religious and cultural celebration that generally features parades, games, artisans, amusement rides, regional food, and live entertainment.

Known locally as the Festival del Acabe de Café, the End of the Coffee Harvest Festival is celebrated on President's Day weekend in February. It celebrates the tradition wherein the Hacienda owners would provide a feast for their workers at the end of the coffee harvest. The festival was founded in 1977 by then mayor, Vicente Byron.

Other festivals and events celebrated in Maricao include:

- Indigenous Day Festival - April - celebrated in the Indiera barrios of Maricao
- Homage to Mothers – May
- Youth Festival – July
- New Year's Eve celebrations – December

== Economy ==
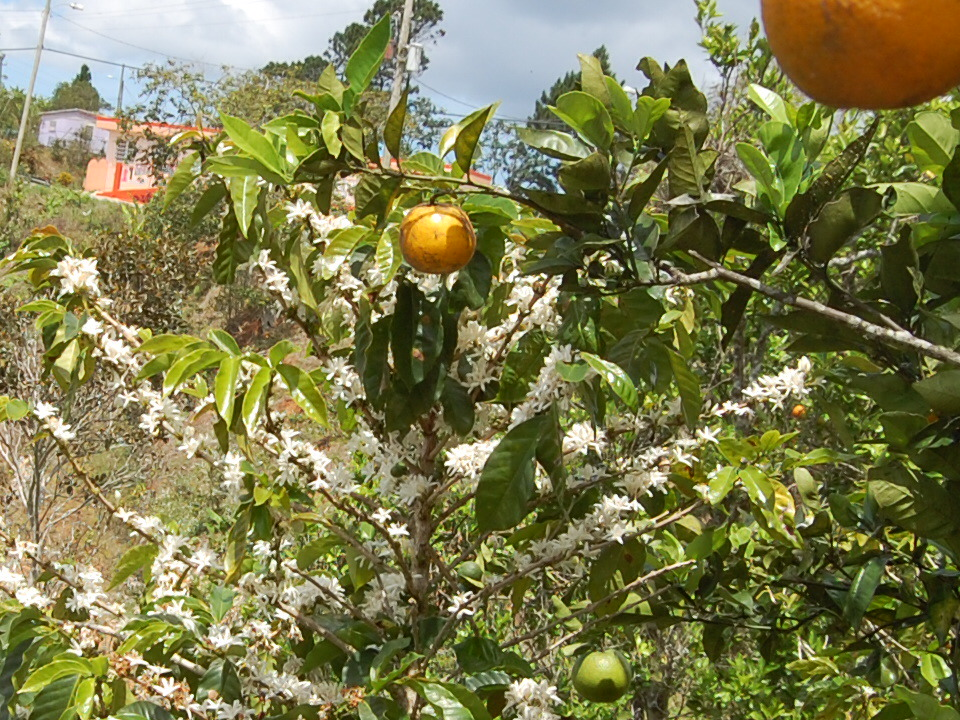
Multi-crop farm in Maricao

For decades, Maricao's economy has relied on agriculture, specifically coffee plantations. Fruits and vegetables are also grown in the town. Currently only one factory is established in Maricao, Fenwal Blood Technologies. Devices and materials that are used in blood donation, transfusion, transportation and storage are produced there. Tourism has also played an important role in the town's economy.

For two decades, this municipality has had the highest level of children living in poverty in Puerto Rico.

== Demographics ==
Historical population
Census	Pop.	Note	%±
1900	8,312		—
1910	7,158		−13.9%
1920	8,291		15.8%
1930	6,463		−22.0%
1940	7,724		19.5%
1950	7,403		−4.2%
1960	6,990		−5.6%
1970	5,991		−14.3%
1980	6,737		12.5%
1990	6,206		−7.9%
2000	6,449		3.9%
2010	6,276		−2.7%
2020	4,755		−24.2%
2025 (est.)	4,336	▼	−8.8%
U.S. Decennial Census; 1899 (shown as 1900) 1910-1930; 1930-1950 1960-2000 2010 2020

According to the 2000 census, Maricao is the second least populous municipality in Puerto Rico, above the island municipality of Culebra, with 6,449 inhabitants. The 2020 census shows the municipality remains the second least populated with a population of 4,455. The population of the town has decreased during the past decades in part due to the decline in coffee production and the deteriorating economy. In 1899, the population was 8,312. Making the population density is 174.2 people per square mile (67.0/km^{2}).

As a whole, Puerto Rico is mainly made up of people from a Criollo (born on the Island of European descent) or Spanish and European descent. The 2000 census shows that 90.3% of Maricaeños have Spanish or White origin. The majority of the local population are partly descended from pre-Columbian indigenous inhabitants.

There is a general consensus in Puerto Rico that the barrios of Indieras in Maricao have the most people of indigenous origin in Puerto Rico.

Race - Maricao, Puerto Rico - 2000 Census
Race	Population	% of Total
White	5,824	90.3%
Black/African American	194	3.0%
American Indian and Alaska Native	10	0.2%
Asian	1	0.0%
Native Hawaiian/Pacific Islander	0	0.0%
Some other race	204	3.2%
Two or more races	216	3.3%

== Government ==
Maricao's first mayor was Juan Ferrer y Arnijas, whose term ran from 1874 to 1876. Gilberto Pérez Valentín, alias "El Enano" or the Dwarf, was mayor for seven consecutive terms until he lost his seat in 2020 to Wilfredo "Juny" Ruiz, who was re-elected in 2024.

The city belongs to the Puerto Rico Senatorial district V, which is represented by two Senators. In 2024, Marially González Huertas and Jamie Barlucea, from the Popular Democratic Party and New Progressive Party, respectively, were elected as District Senators.

== Symbols ==
The municipio has an official flag and coat of arms.

=== Flag ===
The flag of Maricao derives its colors, design and symbolism from the municipal shield. It consists of a green cloth, with the three usual dimensions of the municipal flags of Puerto Rico, crossing from an end to another a yellow band with three points. The color green symbolizes the vegetation of the municipality and the yellow band symbolizes the mountains of the region.

=== Coat of arms ===
In a silver field, resides an inverted V-shaped green band. Contained in the band are five golden huts. To either side and below the band are a total of three Maricao (Byrsonima spicata) tree branches with flowers. Surrounding the shield below and to either side are two coffee tree branches. Above it is placed a gold mural crown with three towers outlined in black with green doors and windows.

=== Name ===
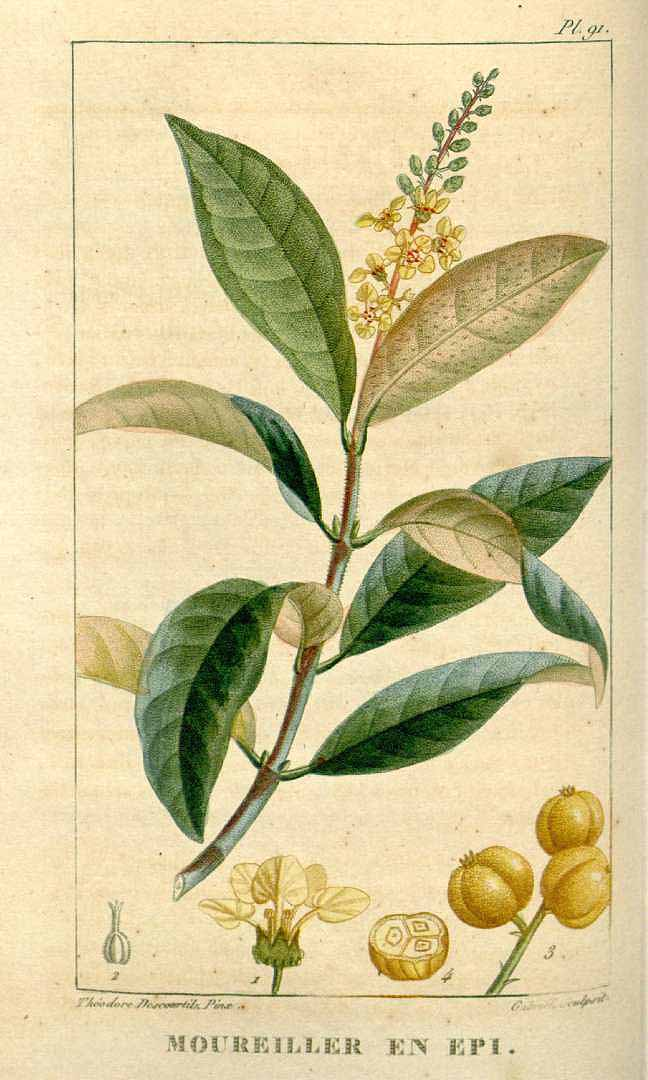
Illustration of Byrsonima spicata or the Maricao tree

The origin of its name has two versions. It is said to come from the name of the Maricao tree (Byrsonima spicata) which has yellow flowers and grows in the region. The second version is a legend about a Taíno woman called María that, during the Spanish colonization, fell in love with a Spanish soldier. She informed him of an attack planned by her tribe and the Spanish took the offensive. María was then taken prisoner by her people and tried for treason. As was the tradition, she was tied to a tree and sacrificed. Allegedly "cao" means "sacrifice" so Maricao means "María's sacrifice"; this is considered folk etymology.

== Education ==
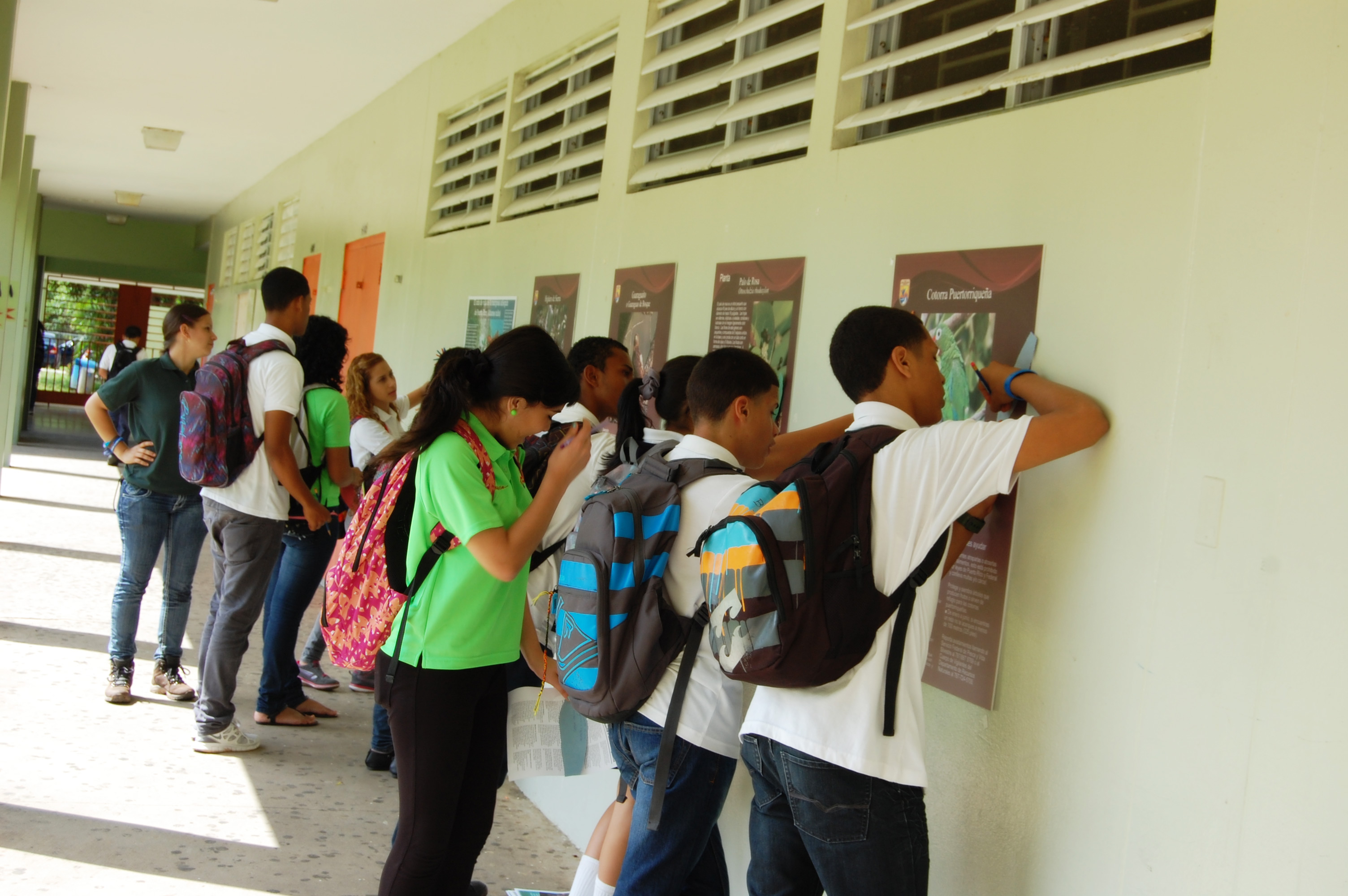
Kids gathering information on display about endangered species at a school in Maricao on May 4, 2012

Maricao has several public and private schools distributed through several regions. Public education is handled by the Puerto Rico Department of Education.

== Transportation ==
There is no direct highway connection to Maricao. Puerto Rico Highway 119 and Puerto Rico Highway 120 lead from the north, while Puerto Rico Highway 121 and Puerto Rico Highway 105 lead from the south. Maricao lies about three hours from San Juan.

There are 13 bridges in Maricao.

== Notable natives and residents ==
- Rafael Pico - Educator
- Pedro Segarra - Mayor of Hartford, Connecticut

== Gallery ==
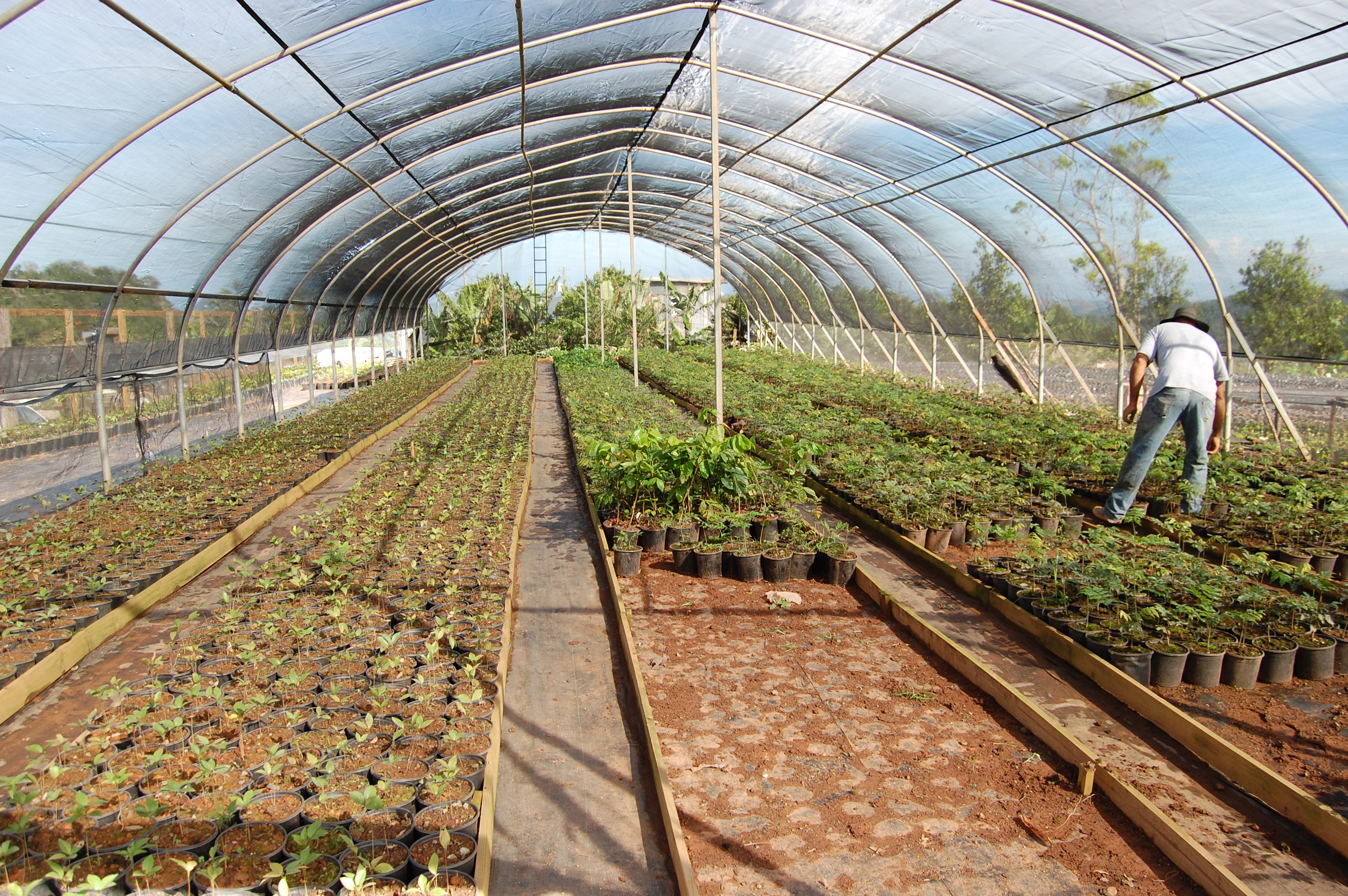
Native trees for conservation

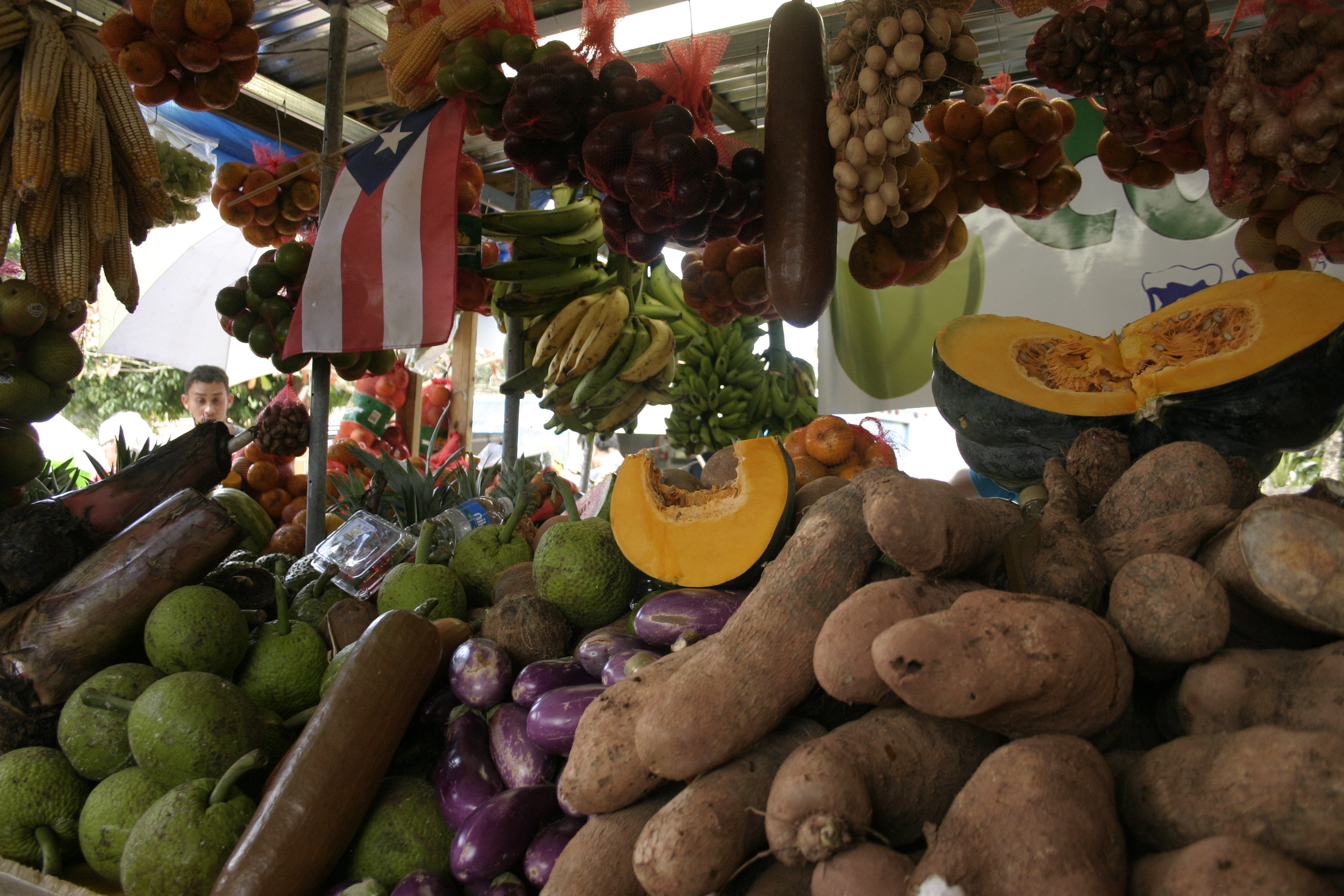
Vegetable stand at Fiesta Acabe del Café in Maricao in 2014

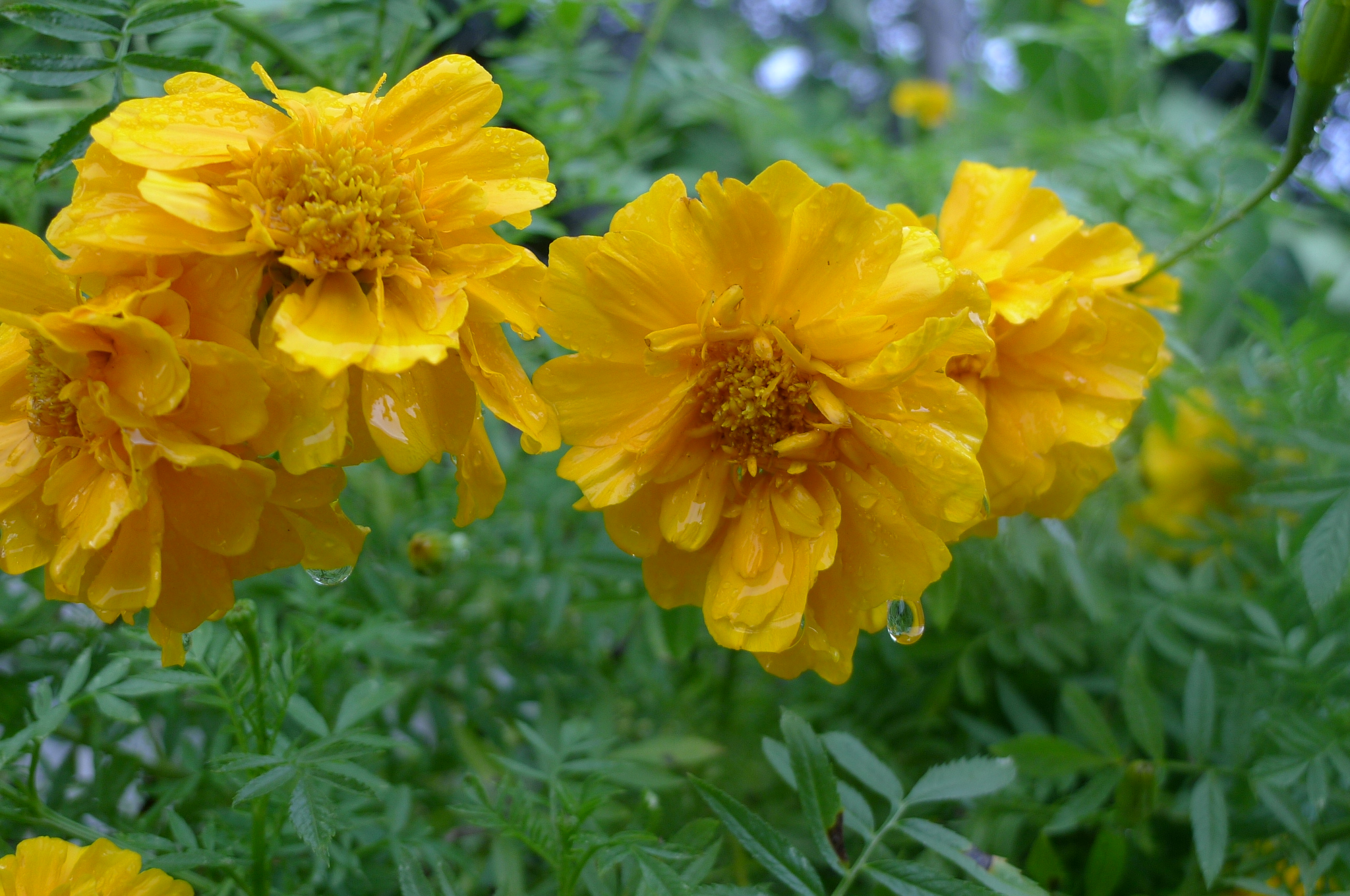
Yellow flowers in Maricao

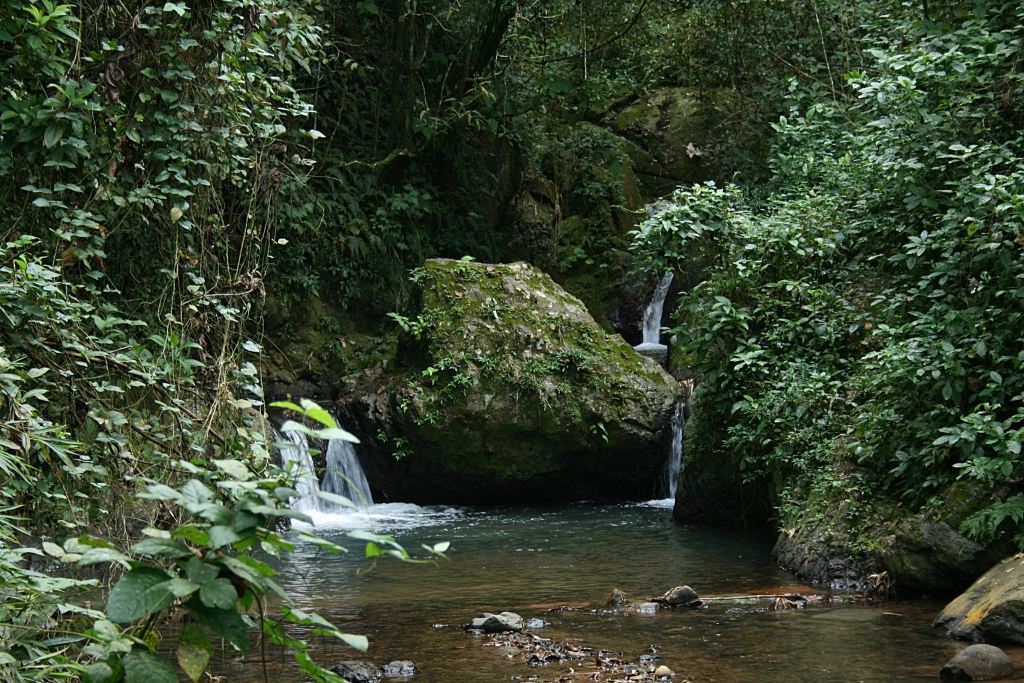
Water stream at El Monte del Estado

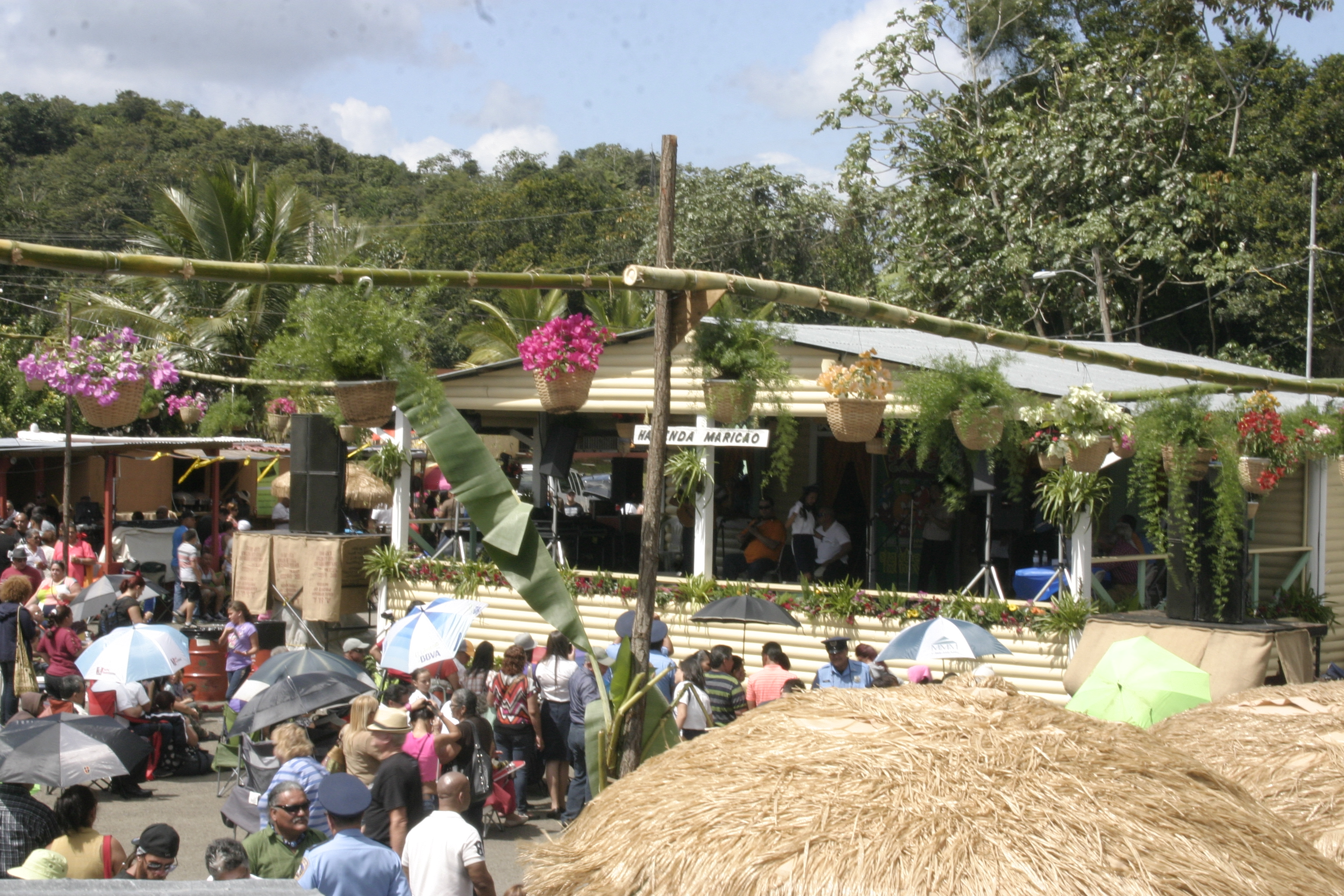
Hacienda Maricao where the Fiesta Acabe del Café is celebrated in Maricao

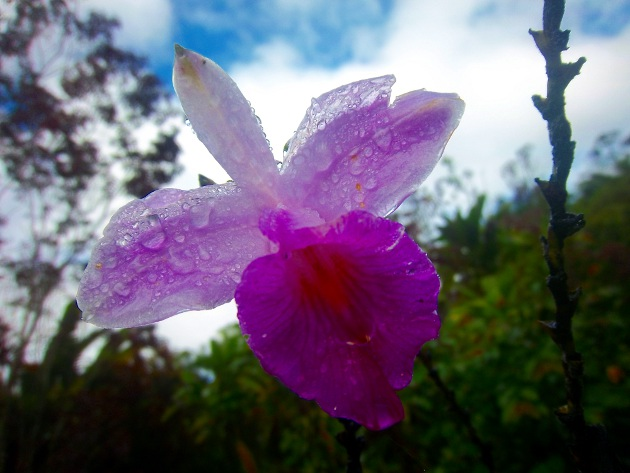
Orchid in Maricao

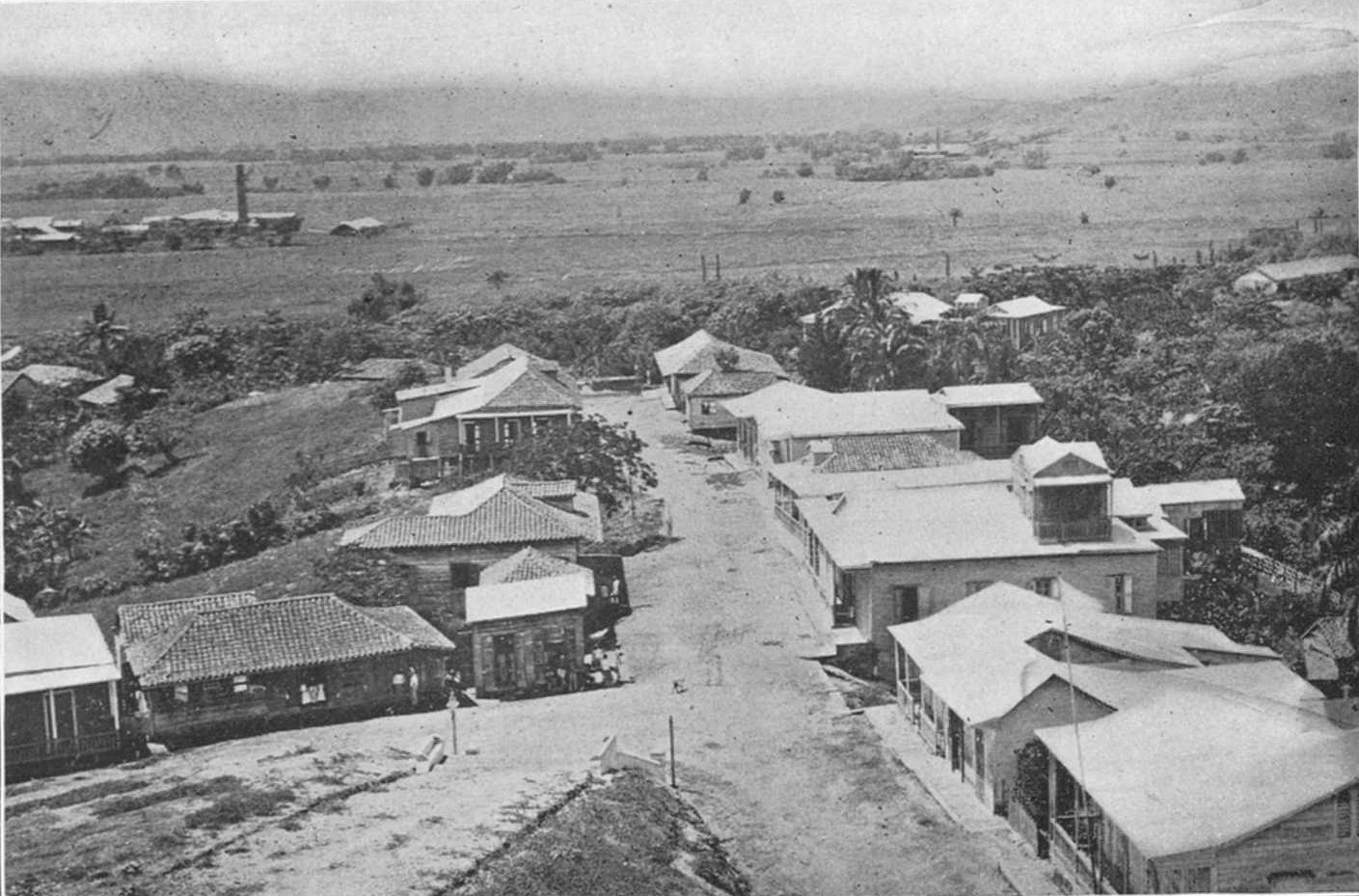
Maricao around the end of the Spanish-American War (1898)

== See also ==
- List of Puerto Ricans
- History of Puerto Rico
- Did you know-Puerto Rico?
