= Indiera Baja =

Barrio of Maricao, Puerto Rico

- Barrio
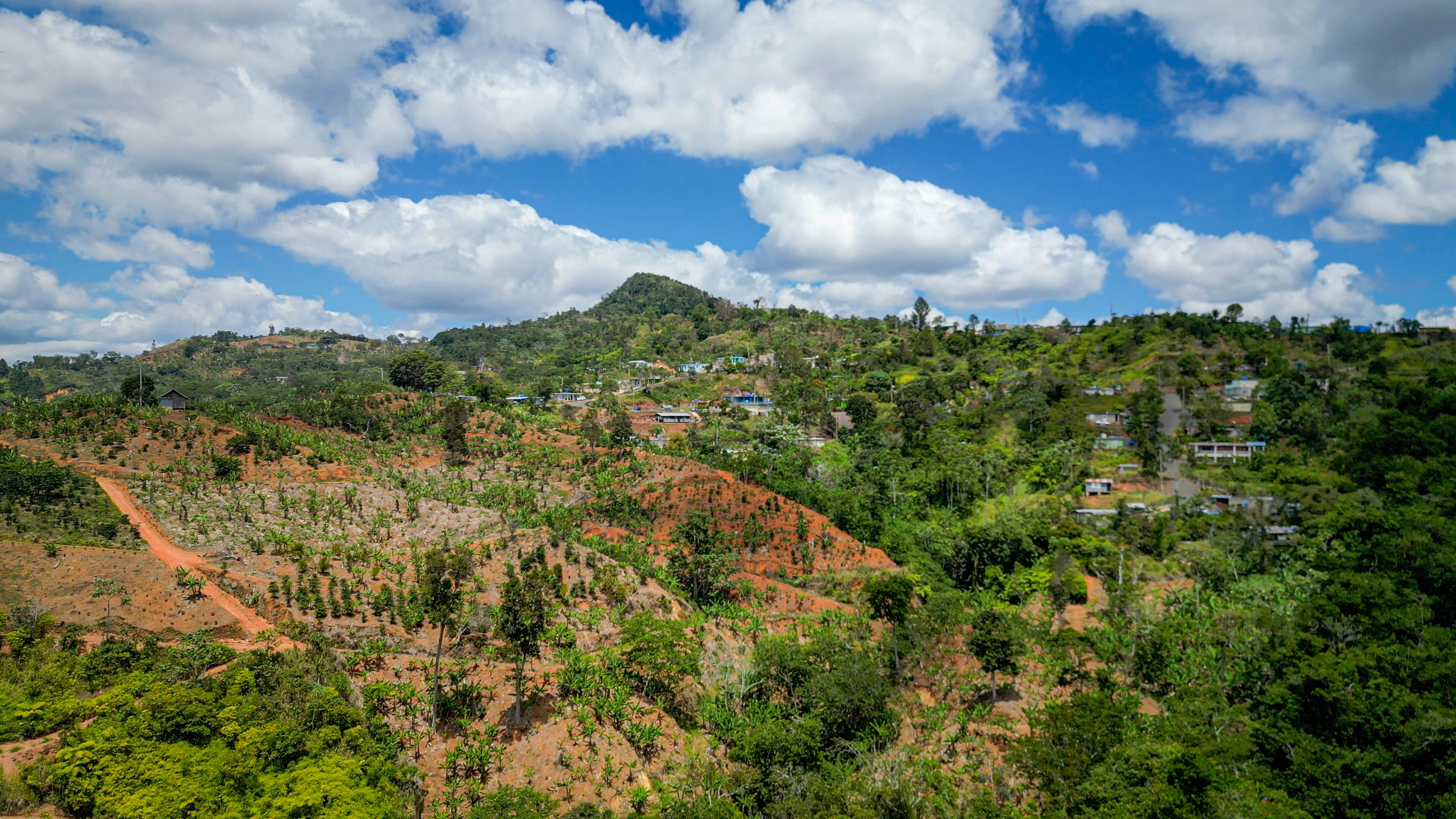
- Mountains in Indiera Baja

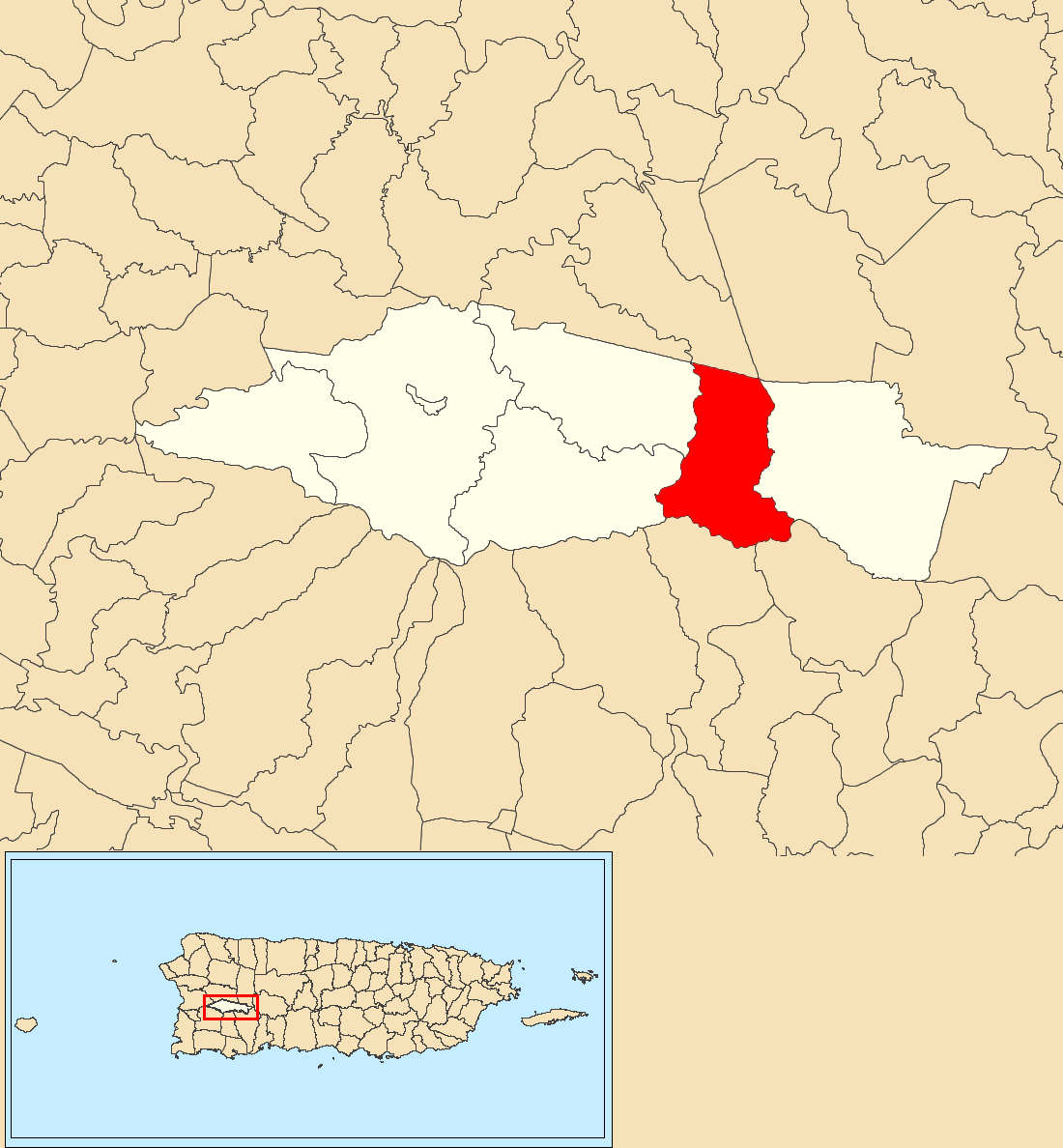
- Location of Indiera Baja within the municipality of Maricao shown in red

- Location of Puerto Rico
- Coordinates: 18°10′02″N 66°54′20″W
- Commonwealth: Puerto Rico
- Municipality: Maricao

Area
  - Total: 3.86 sq mi (10.0 km^{2})
  - Land: 3.86 sq mi (10.0 km^{2})
  - Water: 0 sq mi (0 km^{2})
- Elevation: 2,523 ft (769 m)

Population (2010)
  - Total: 518
  - Density: 134.2/sq mi (51.8/km^{2})
- Source: 2010 Census
- Time zone: UTC−4 (AST)

Indiera Baja is a barrio in the municipality of Maricao, Puerto Rico. Its population in 2010 was 548.

== History ==
Indiera Baja is one of the three Indieras de Maricao, the other two being Indiera Alta and Indiera Fría. Difficult to access, this geographic area served as a refuge for Taínos fleeing Spanish and other European colonizers, who began colonizing Puerto Rico in the 15th century.

Indiera Baja was in Spain's gazetteers until Puerto Rico was ceded by Spain in the aftermath of the Spanish–American War under the terms of the Treaty of Paris of 1898 and became an unincorporated territory of the United States. In 1899, the United States Department of War conducted a census of Puerto Rico finding that the population of Indiera Baja barrio was 933.

Historical population
Census	Pop.	Note	%±
1900	933		—
1910	778		−16.6%
1920	949		22.0%
1930	693		−27.0%
1940	909		31.2%
1950	622		−31.6%
1960	504		−19.0%
1970	439		−12.9%
1980	463		5.5%
1990	408		−11.9%
2000	783		91.9%
2010	518		−33.8%
U.S. Decennial Census; 1899 (shown as 1900) 1910-1930; 1930-1950; 1960 1980-2000 2010

== See also ==
- List of communities in Puerto Rico
