= Maricao River =

River of Puerto Rico

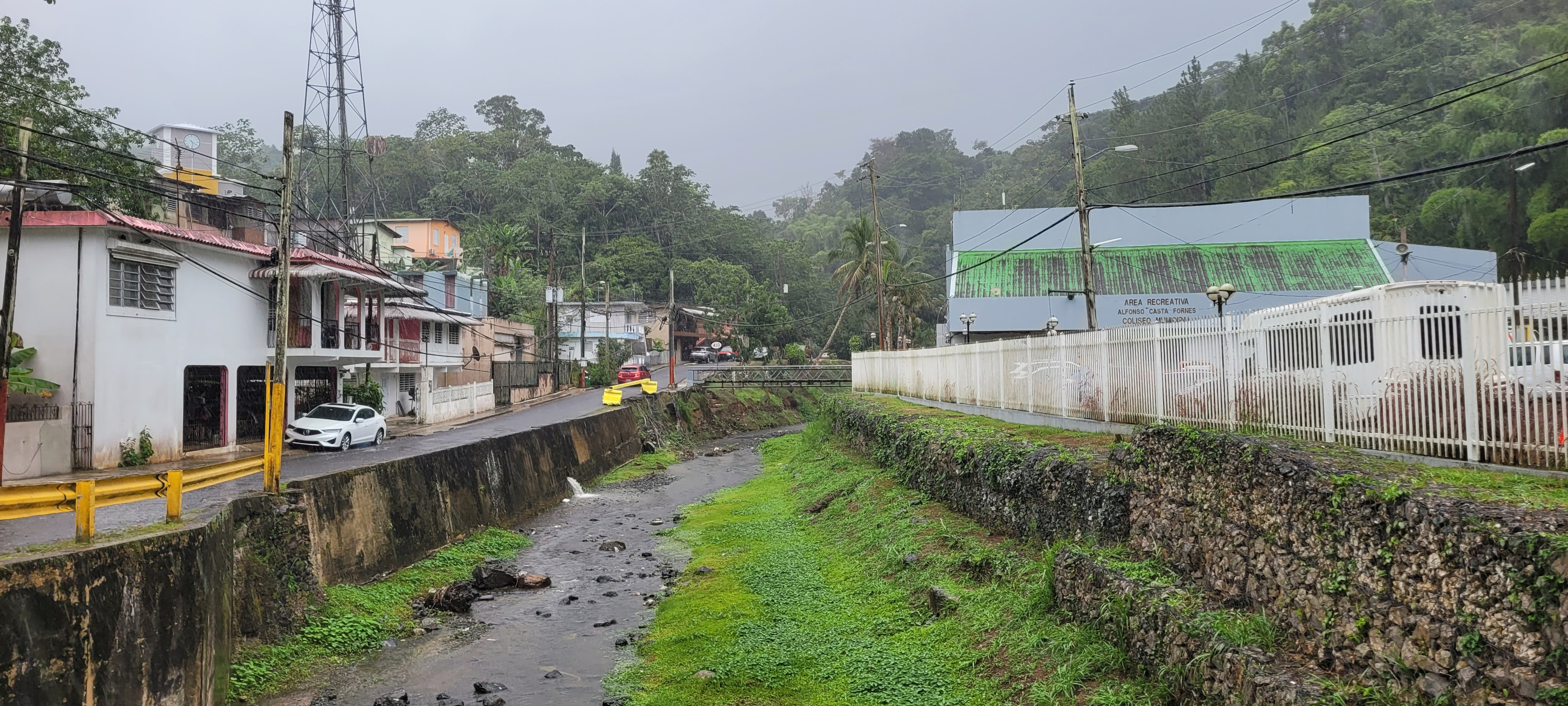
- Maricao River in Maricao barrio-pueblo
- Native name: Río Maricao (Spanish)

Location
- Commonwealth: Puerto Rico
- Municipality: Maricao

Physical characteristics
- Source
  - coordinates: 18.1846785°N 67.0312900°W
  - elevation: 581 ft.

The Maricao River (Spanish: Río Maricao) is a river of Maricao and Mayagüez, Puerto Rico.

== See also ==
- List of rivers of Puerto Rico
