= Indiera Fría =

Barrio of Maricao, Puerto Rico

- Barrio
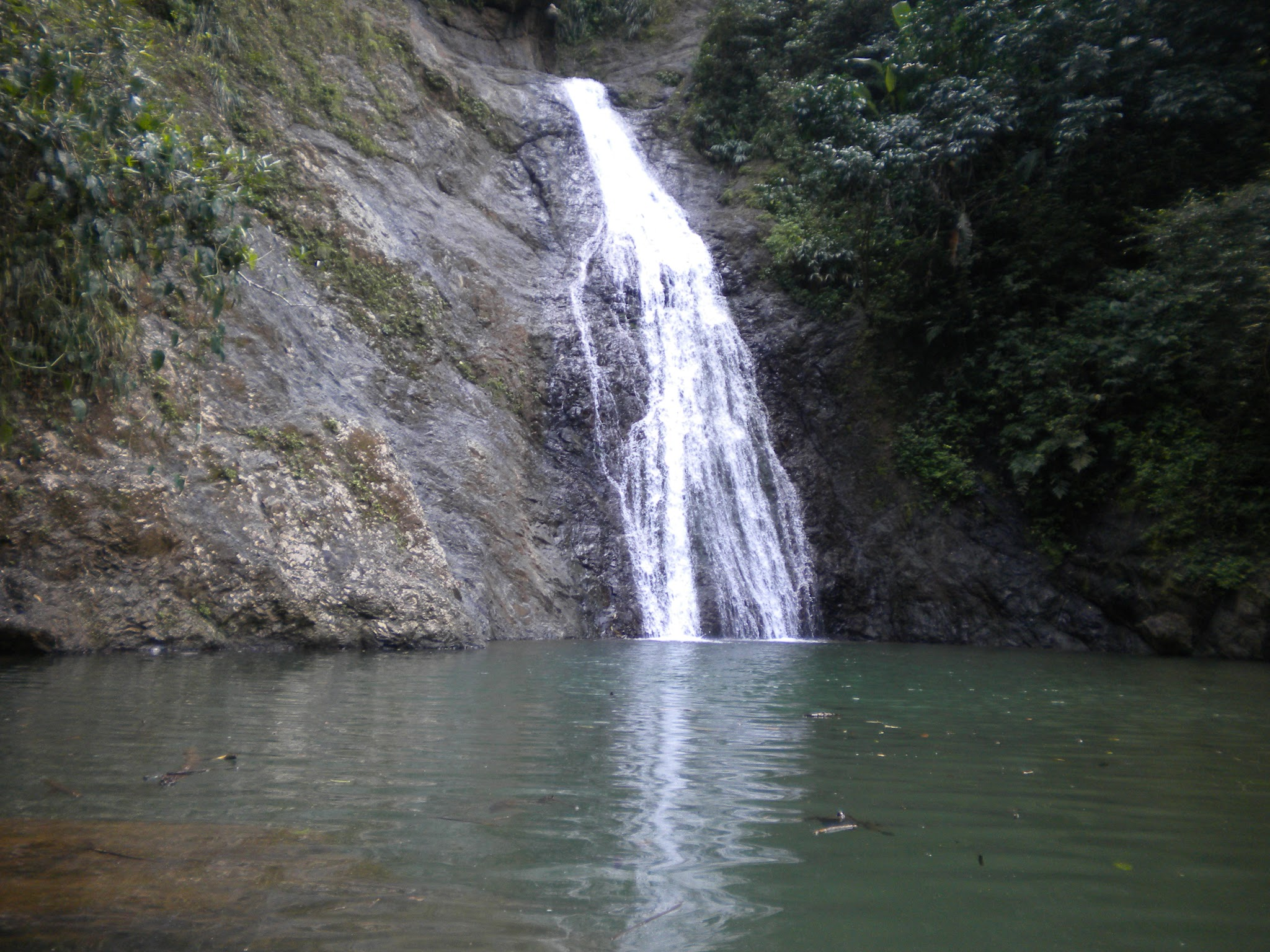
- Waterfall in Indiera Fría

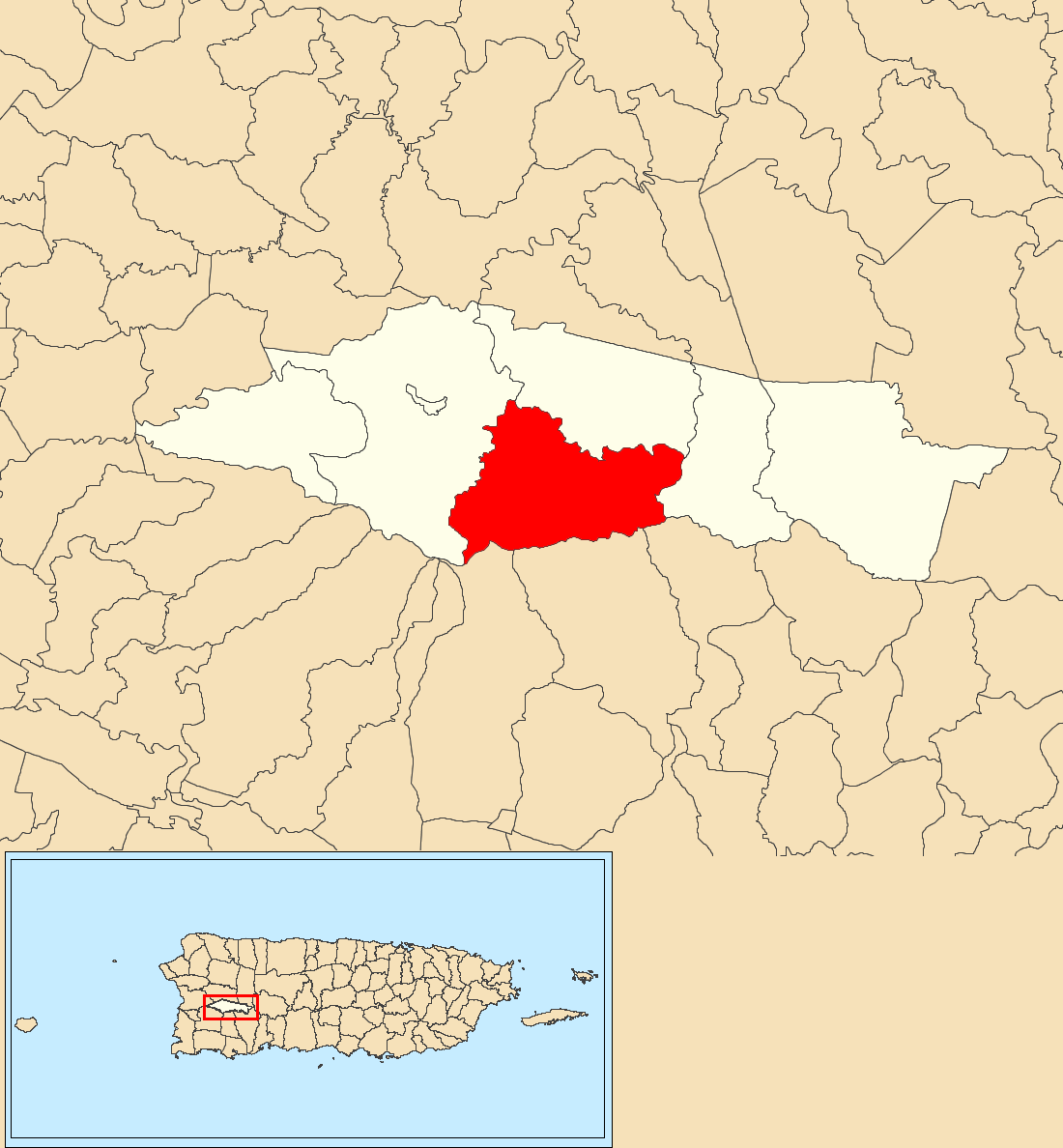
- Location of Indiera Fría within the municipality of Maricao shown in red

- Location of Puerto Rico
- Coordinates: 18°09′40″N 66°56′51″W
- Commonwealth: Puerto Rico
- Municipality: Maricao

Area
  - Total: 5.84 sq mi (15.1 km^{2})
  - Land: 5.84 sq mi (15.1 km^{2})
  - Water: 0 sq mi (0 km^{2})
- Elevation: 1,663 ft (507 m)

Population (2010)
  - Total: 449
  - Density: 76.9/sq mi (29.7/km^{2})
- Source: 2010 Census
- Time zone: UTC−4 (AST)

Indiera Fría is a barrio in the municipality of Maricao, Puerto Rico. Its population in 2010 was 449.

== History ==
Indiera Fría is one of the three Indieras de Maricao, the other two being Indiera Baja and Indiera Alta. Difficult to access, this geographic area served as a refuge for Taínos fleeing Spanish and other European colonizers, who began colonizing Puerto Rico in the 15th century.

Indiera Fría was in Spain's gazetteers until Puerto Rico was ceded by Spain in the aftermath of the Spanish–American War under the terms of the Treaty of Paris of 1898 and became an unincorporated territory of the United States. In 1899, the United States Department of War conducted a census of Puerto Rico finding that the population of Indiera Fria barrio was 1,165.

Historical population
Census	Pop.	Note	%±
1900	1,165		—
1910	748		−35.8%
1920	758		1.3%
1930	581		−23.4%
1940	772		32.9%
1950	537		−30.4%
1960	849		58.1%
1970	582		−31.4%
1980	584		0.3%
1990	508		−13.0%
2000	450		−11.4%
2010	449		−0.2%
U.S. Decennial Census; 1899 (shown as 1900) 1910-1930; 1930-1950; 1960 1980-2000 2010

== Gallery ==
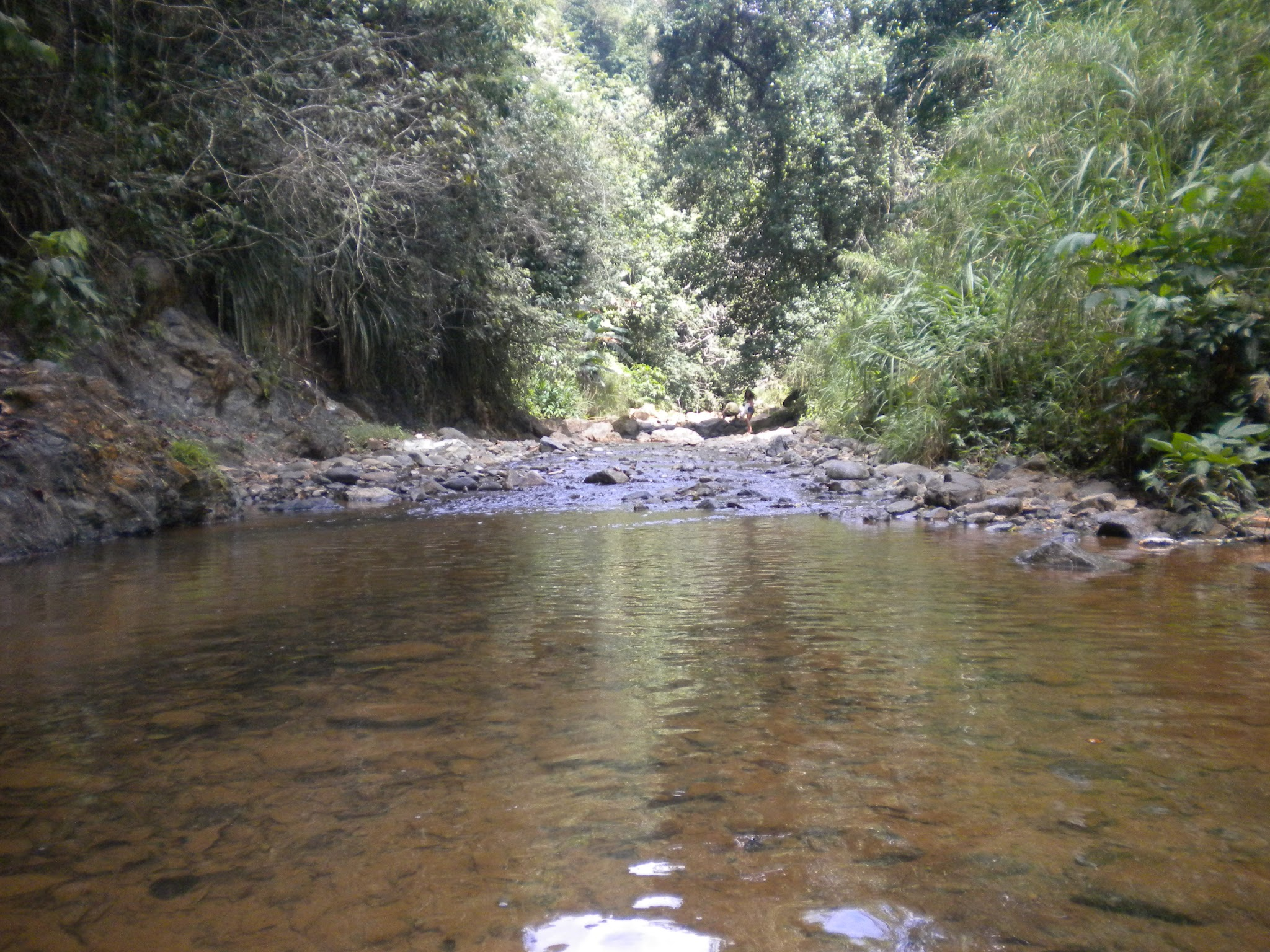
Salto Curet in Indiera Fría in Maricao

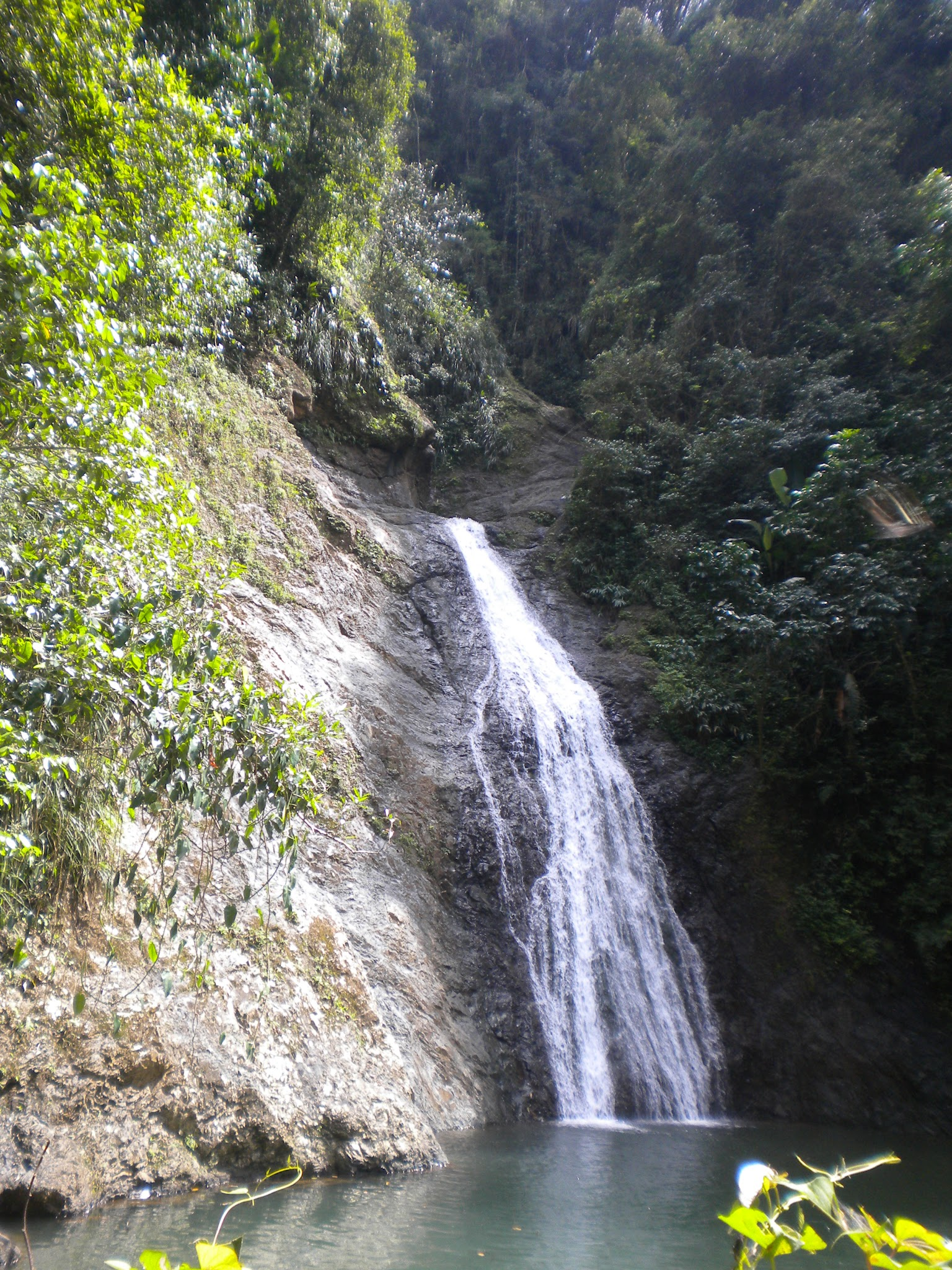
Waterfall in Indiera Fría

== See also ==
- List of communities in Puerto Rico
