= Indiera Alta =

Barrio of Maricao, Puerto Rico

- Barrio
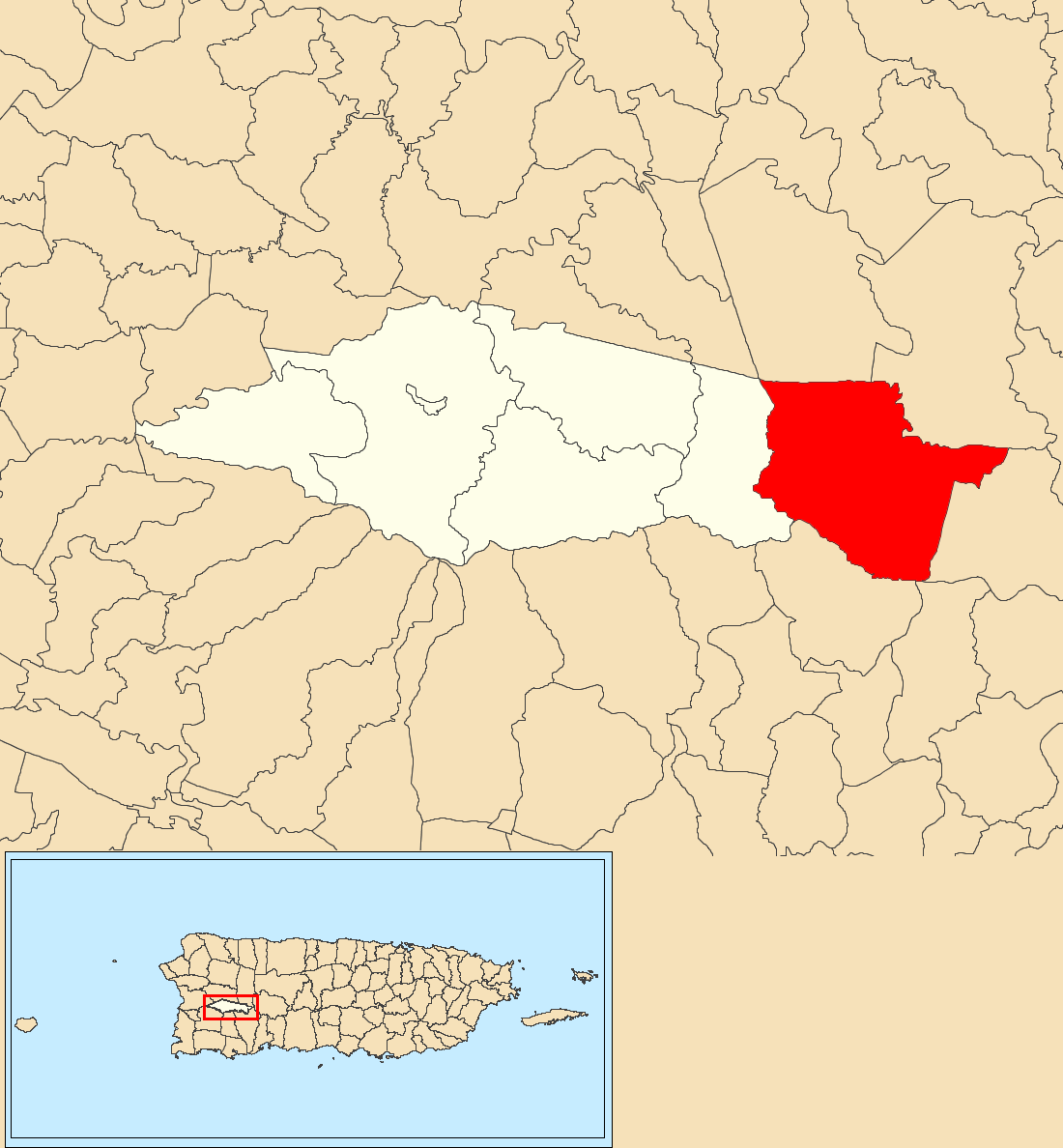
- Location of Indiera Alta within the municipality of Maricao shown in red

- Location of Puerto Rico
- Coordinates: 18°09′48″N 66°52′22″W
- Commonwealth: Puerto Rico
- Municipality: Maricao

Area
  - Total: 8.11 sq mi (21.0 km^{2})
  - Land: 8.11 sq mi (21.0 km^{2})
  - Water: 0 sq mi (0 km^{2})
- Elevation: 2,198 ft (670 m)

Population (2010)
  - Total: 1,369
  - Density: 168.8/sq mi (65.2/km^{2})
- Source: 2010 Census
- Time zone: UTC−4 (AST)

Indiera Alta is a barrio in the municipality of Maricao, Puerto Rico. Its 2010 population was 1,369.

== History ==
Indiera Alta is one of the three Indieras de Maricao, the other two being Indiera Baja and Indiera Fría. Difficult to access, this geographic area served as a refuge for Taínos fleeing Spanish and other European colonizers, who began colonizing Puerto Rico in the 15th century.

Indiera Alta was in Spain's gazetteers until Puerto Rico was ceded by Spain in the aftermath of the Spanish–American War under the terms of the Treaty of Paris of 1898 and became an unincorporated territory of the United States. In 1899, the United States Department of War conducted a census of Puerto Rico finding that the population of Indiera Alta barrio was 1,145.

Historical population
Census	Pop.	Note	%±
1900	1,145		—
1910	1,092		−4.6%
1920	1,235		13.1%
1930	935		−24.3%
1940	981		4.9%
1950	1,776		81.0%
1960	1,715		−3.4%
1970	1,187		−30.8%
1980	1,332		12.2%
1990	1,155		−13.3%
2000	1,379		19.4%
2010	1,369		−0.7%
U.S. Decennial Census; 1899 (shown as 1900) 1910-1930; 1930-1950; 1960 1980-2000 2010

== See also ==
- List of communities in Puerto Rico
