= Maricao Afuera =

Barrio of Maricao, Puerto Rico

- Barrio
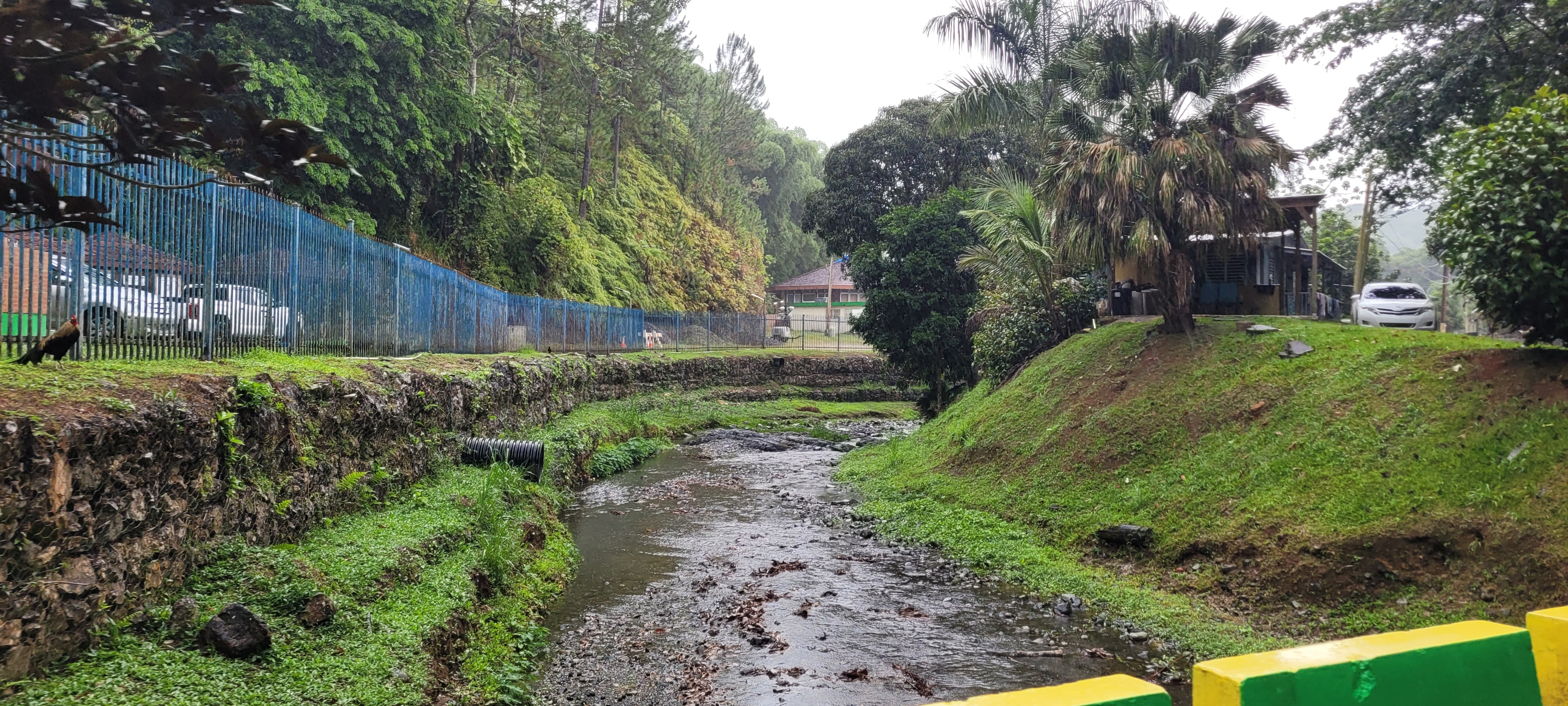
- Maricao River in Maricao Afuera

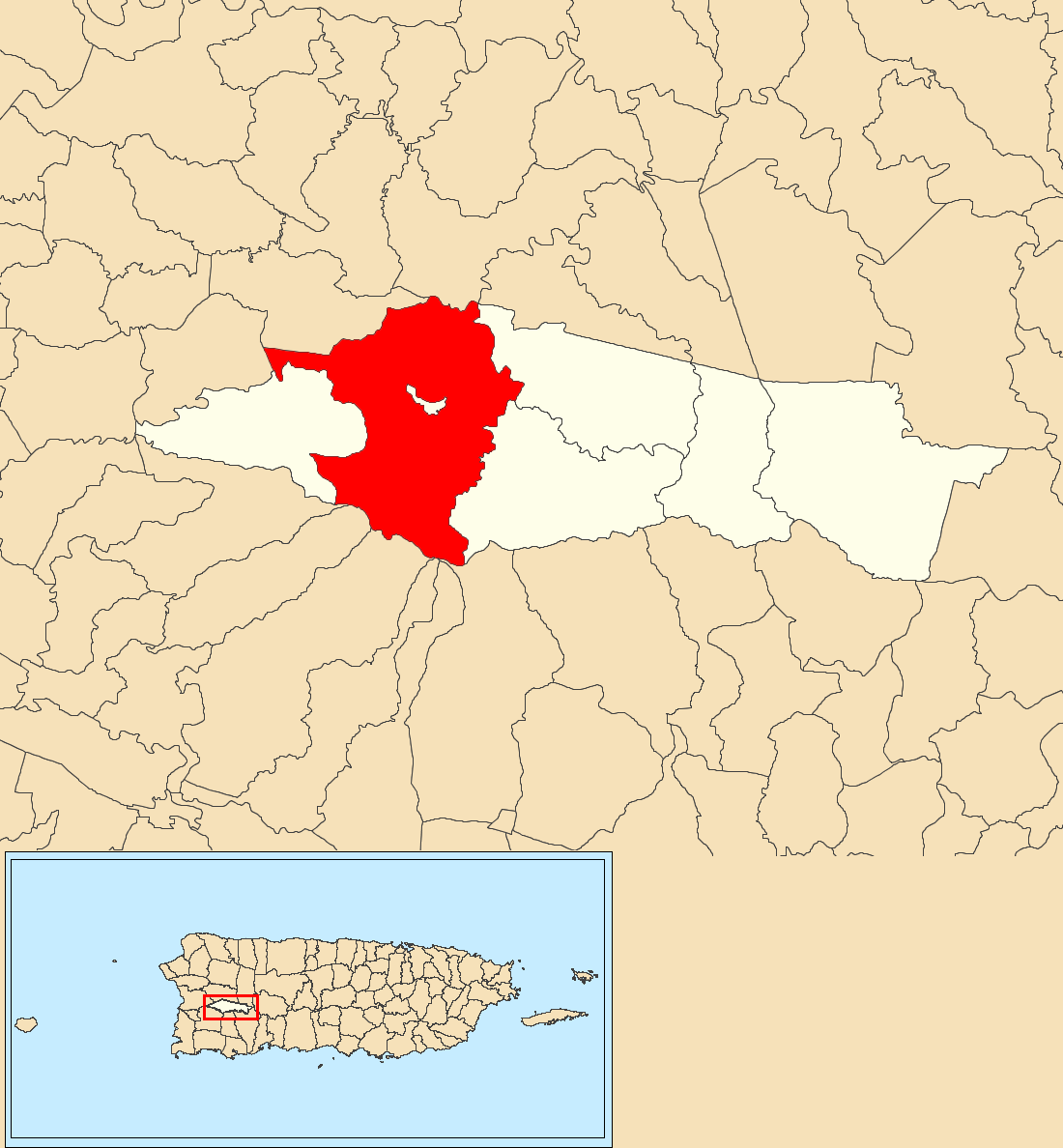
- Location of Maricao Afuera within the municipality of Maricao shown in red

- Location of Puerto Rico
- Coordinates: 18°10′16″N 66°59′17″W
- Commonwealth: Puerto Rico
- Municipality: Maricao

Area
  - Total: 9.04 sq mi (23.4 km^{2})
  - Land: 9.04 sq mi (23.4 km^{2})
  - Water: 0 sq mi (0 km^{2})
- Elevation: 1,611 ft (491 m)

Population (2010)
  - Total: 2,076
  - Density: 229.6/sq mi (88.6/km^{2})
- Source: 2010 Census
- Time zone: UTC−4 (AST)

Maricao Afuera is a barrio in the municipality of Maricao, Puerto Rico. Its population in 2010 was 2,076.

== History ==
Maricao Afuera was in Spain's gazetteers until Puerto Rico was ceded by Spain in the aftermath of the Spanish–American War under the terms of the Treaty of Paris of 1898 and became an unincorporated territory of the United States. In 1899, the United States Department of War conducted a census of Puerto Rico finding that the population of Maricao Afuera barrio was 1,390.

Historical population
Census	Pop.	Note	%±
1900	1,390		—
1910	1,417		1.9%
1920	1,665		17.5%
1930	1,631		−2.0%
1940	1,454		−10.9%
1950	1,338		−8.0%
1960	977		−27.0%
1970	0		−100.0%
1980	1,491		—
1990	1,629		9.3%
2000	1,740		6.8%
2010	2,076		19.3%
U.S. Decennial Census; 1899 (shown as 1900) 1910-1930; 1930-1950; 1960 1980-2000 2010

== See also ==
- List of communities in Puerto Rico
