= Bucarabones, Maricao, Puerto Rico =

Barrio of Puerto Rico

Bucarabones
- Barrio
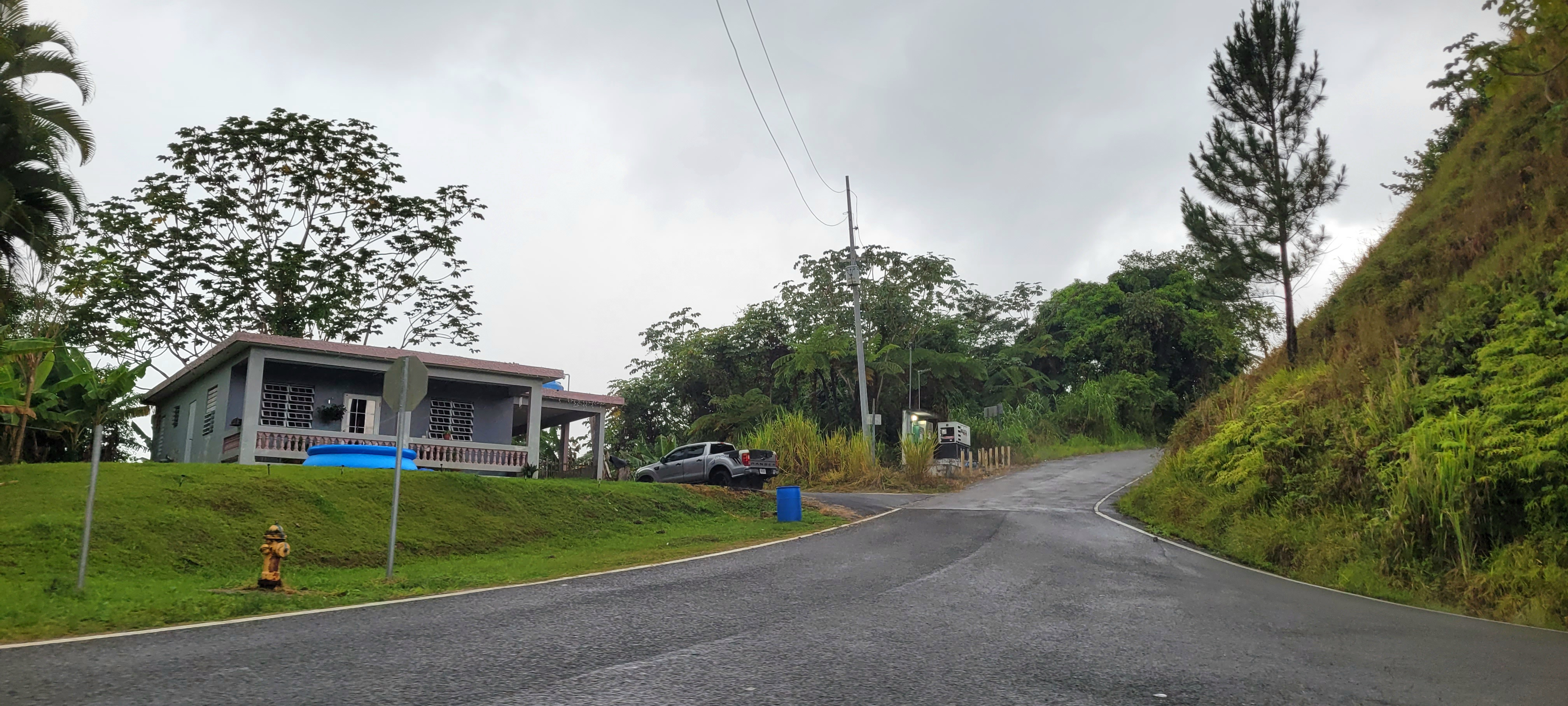
- Puerto Rico Highway 4409 in Bucarabones

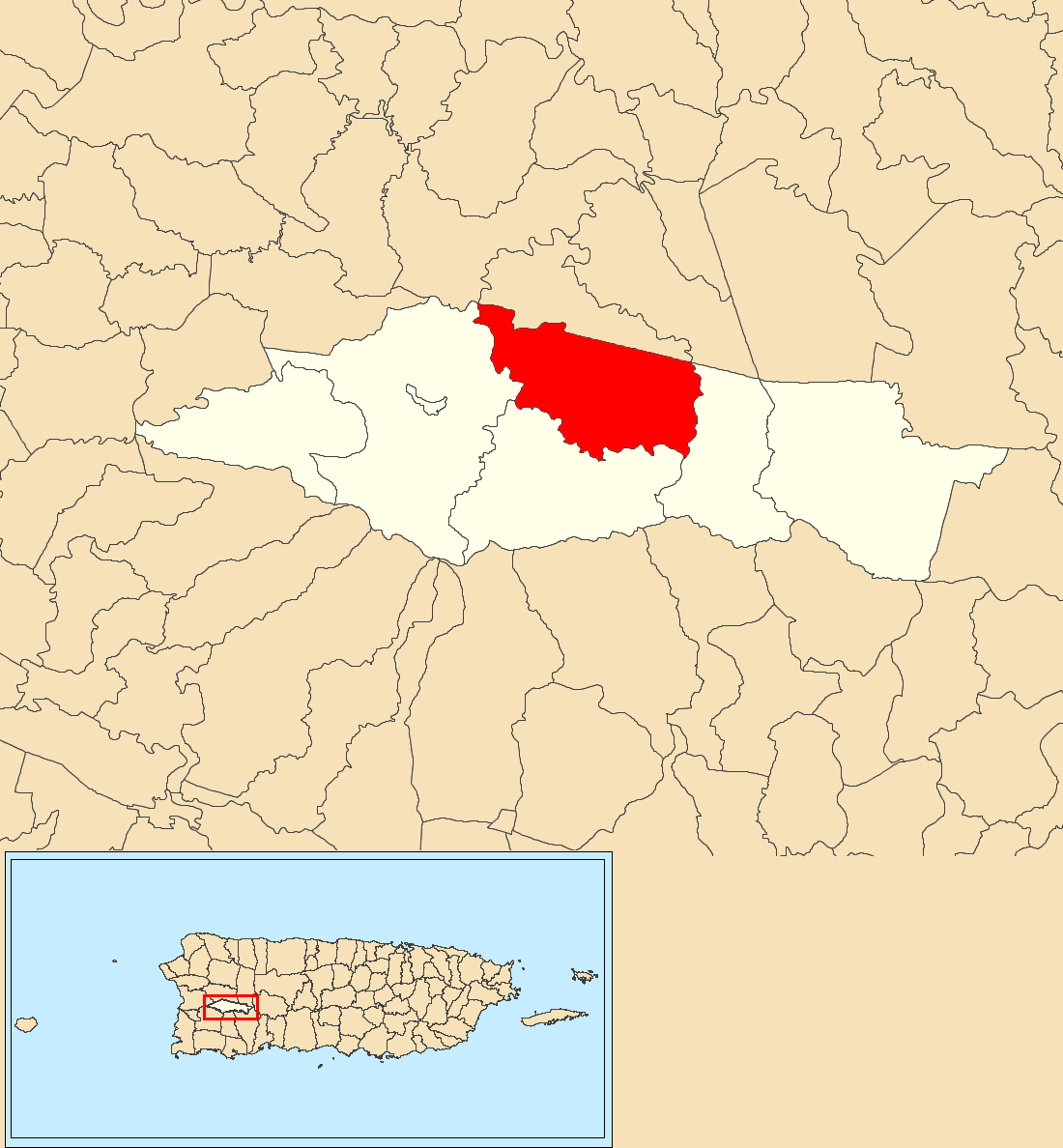
- Location of Bucarabones within the municipality of Maricao shown in red

- Location of Puerto Rico
- Coordinates: 18°11′27″N 66°56′06″W
- Commonwealth: Puerto Rico
- Municipality: Maricao

Area
  - Total: 5.29 sq mi (13.7 km^{2})
  - Land: 5.29 sq mi (13.7 km^{2})
  - Water: 0 sq mi (0 km^{2})
- Elevation: 1,991 ft (607 m)

Population (2010)
  - Total: 164
  - Density: 31/sq mi (12/km^{2})
- Source: 2010 Census
- Time zone: UTC−4 (AST)

Bucarabones is a barrio in the municipality of Maricao, Puerto Rico. Its population in 2010 was 164.

== History ==
Bucarabones was in Spain's gazetteers until Puerto Rico was ceded by Spain in the aftermath of the Spanish–American War under the terms of the Treaty of Paris of 1898 and became an unincorporated territory of the United States. In 1899, the United States Department of War conducted a census of Puerto Rico finding that the population of Bucarabones barrio was 1,354.

Historical population
Census	Pop.	Note	%±
1900	1,354		—
1910	1,454		7.4%
1920	1,866		28.3%
1930	1,188		−36.3%
1940	1,543		29.9%
1950	1,019		−34.0%
1960	716		−29.7%
1970	690		−3.6%
1980	610		−11.6%
1990	497		−18.5%
2000	50		−89.9%
2010	164		228.0%
U.S. Decennial Census; 1899 (shown as 1900) 1910-1930; 1930-1950; 1960 1970 1980-2000 2010

== See also ==
- List of communities in Puerto Rico
