= Montoso, Maricao, Puerto Rico =

Barrio of Puerto Rico

Montoso
- Barrio
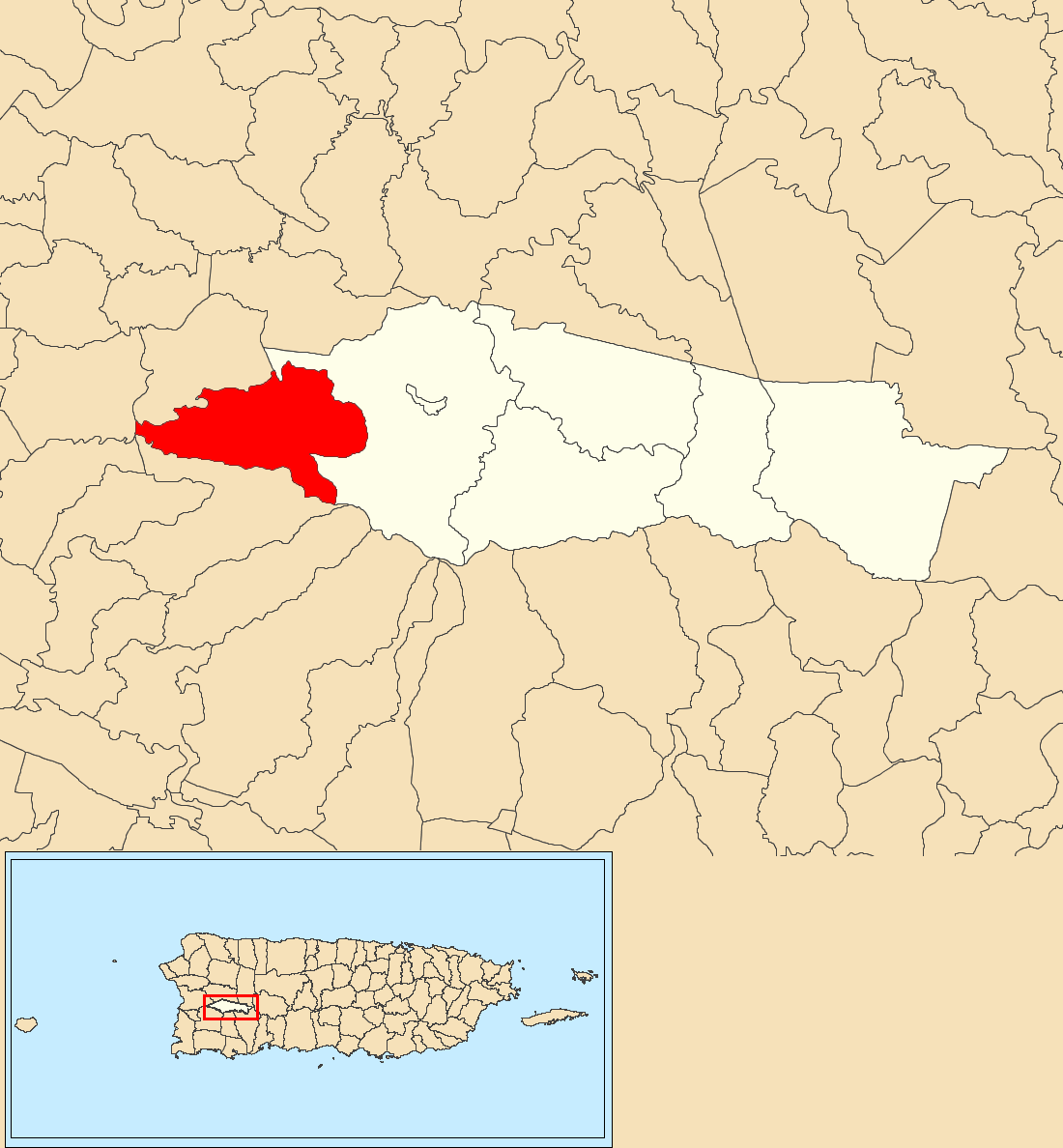
- Location of Montoso within the municipality of Maricao shown in red

- Location of Puerto Rico
- Coordinates: 18°10′32″N 67°01′07″W
- Commonwealth: Puerto Rico
- Municipality: Maricao

Area
  - Total: 4.37 sq mi (11.3 km^{2})
  - Land: 4.37 sq mi (11.3 km^{2})
  - Water: 0 sq mi (0 km^{2})
- Elevation: 1,024 ft (312 m)

Population (2010)
  - Total: 984
  - Density: 225.2/sq mi (87.0/km^{2})
- Source: 2010 Census
- Time zone: UTC−4 (AST)

Montoso is a barrio in the municipality of Maricao, Puerto Rico. Its population in 2010 was 984.

== History ==
Montoso was in Spain's gazetteers until Puerto Rico was ceded by Spain in the aftermath of the Spanish–American War under the terms of the Treaty of Paris of 1898 and became an unincorporated territory of the United States. In 1899, the United States Department of War conducted a census of Puerto Rico finding that the population of Montoso barrio was 1,146.

Historical population
Census	Pop.	Note	%±
1900	1,146		—
1910	937		−18.2%
1920	1,078		15.0%
1930	533		−50.6%
1940	772		44.8%
1950	748		−3.1%
1960	754		0.8%
1970	572		−24.1%
1980	1,052		83.9%
1990	1,202		14.3%
2000	1,156		−3.8%
2010	984		−14.9%
U.S. Decennial Census; 1899 (shown as 1900) 1910-1930; 1930-1950; 1960 1980-2000 2010

== See also ==
- List of communities in Puerto Rico
