= Puerto Rico Highway 119 =

Highway in Puerto Rico

Highway 119
- Ruta 119

Route information
- Maintained by Puerto Rico DTPW
- Length: 79.7 km (49.5 mi)
- Existed: 1953–present

Major junctions
- South end: PR-2 in Caín Bajo
- PR-105 in Montoso; PR-105 / PR-357 in Montoso; PR-106 in Naranjales–Montoso–Naranjales; PR-4406 in Furnias; PR-124 in Las Marías barrio-pueblo; PR-125 in Piedras Blancas–Bahomamey; PR-109 in San Sebastián barrio-pueblo; PR-111 in Piedras Blancas–Bahomamey; PR-113 in Piedra Gorda; PR-130 in Hatillo barrio-pueblo
- North end: PR-2 in Hatillo barrio-pueblo–Hatillo

Location
- Country: United States
- Territory: Puerto Rico
- Municipalities: San Germán, Maricao, Mayagüez, Las Marías, San Sebastián, Isabela, Quebradillas, Camuy, Hatillo

Highway system
- Roads in Puerto Rico; List
← PR-118	→ PR-120
← PR-4116	PR-4119	→ PR-4128

Puerto Rico Highway 119 (PR-119) is a long north-to-south highway in Puerto Rico that goes from Puerto Rico Highway 2 in Hatillo, close to its border with Camuy to the same highway in San Germán. It goes through the municipalities of Camuy, San Sebastián, Las Marías and Maricao before ending in the freeway segment of PR-2. Between Camuy and San Sebastián it passes near Guajataca Lake, the largest artificial lake in western Puerto Rico.

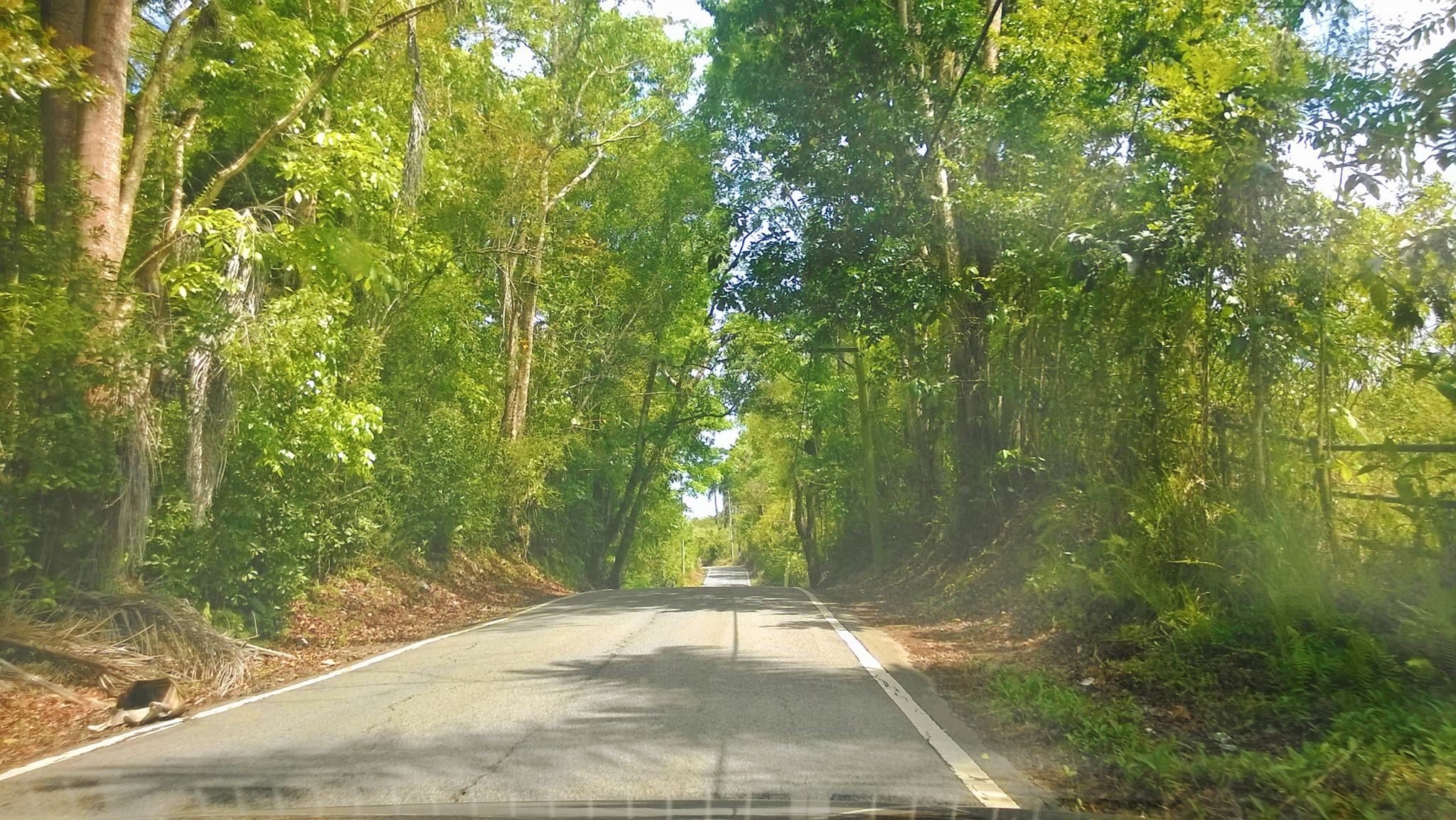
Puerto Rico Highway 119 south in Aibonito, San Sebastián

== Major intersections ==
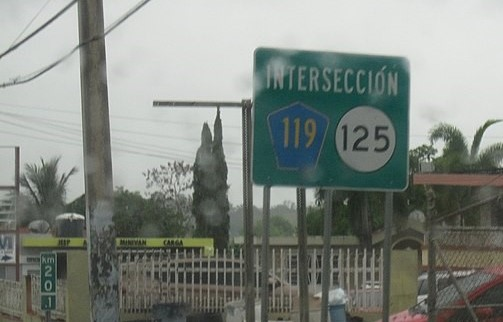
Sign for intersection of Puerto Rico Highways 119 and 125 in San Sebastián

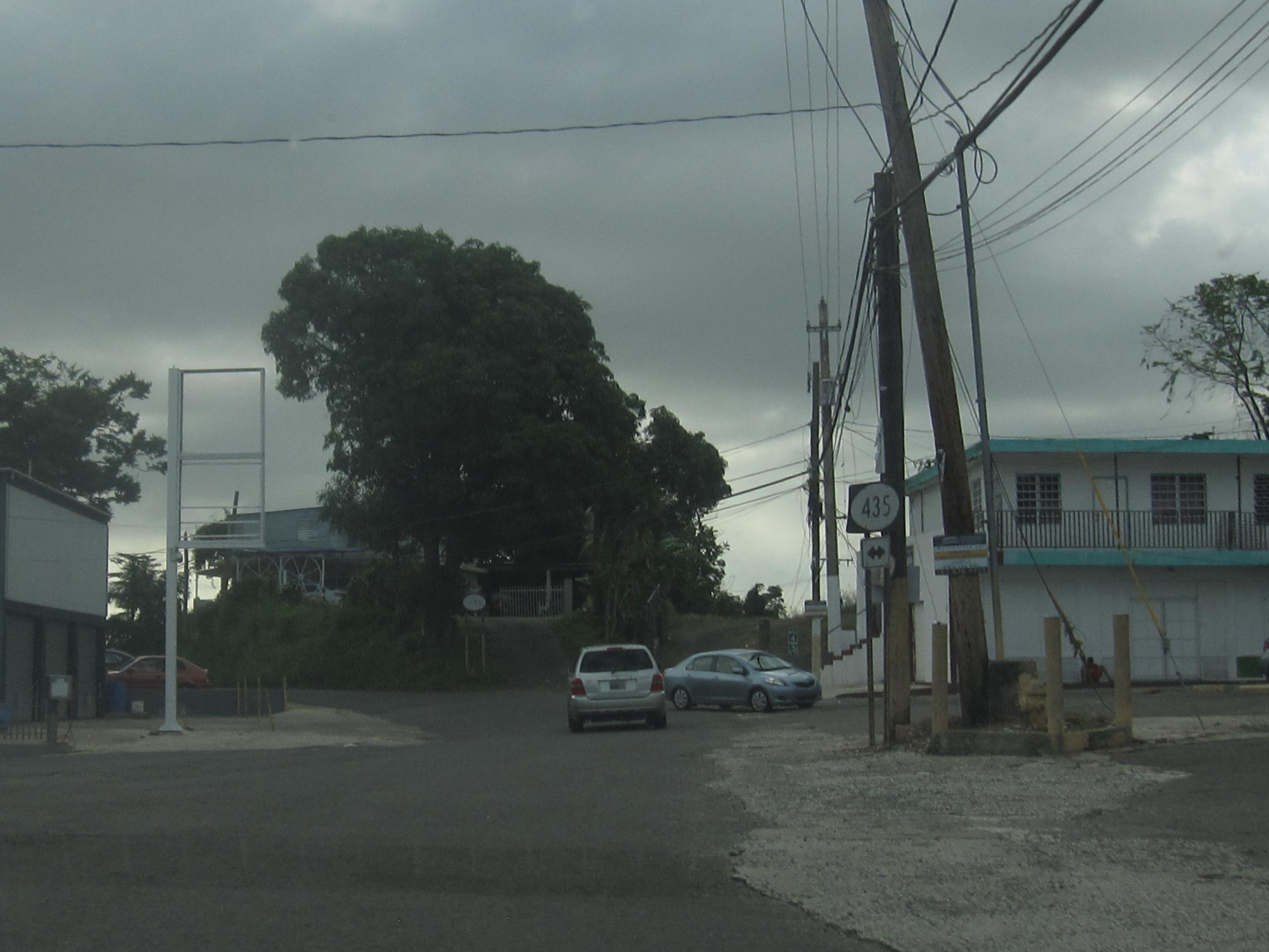
PR-119 intersection with PR-435

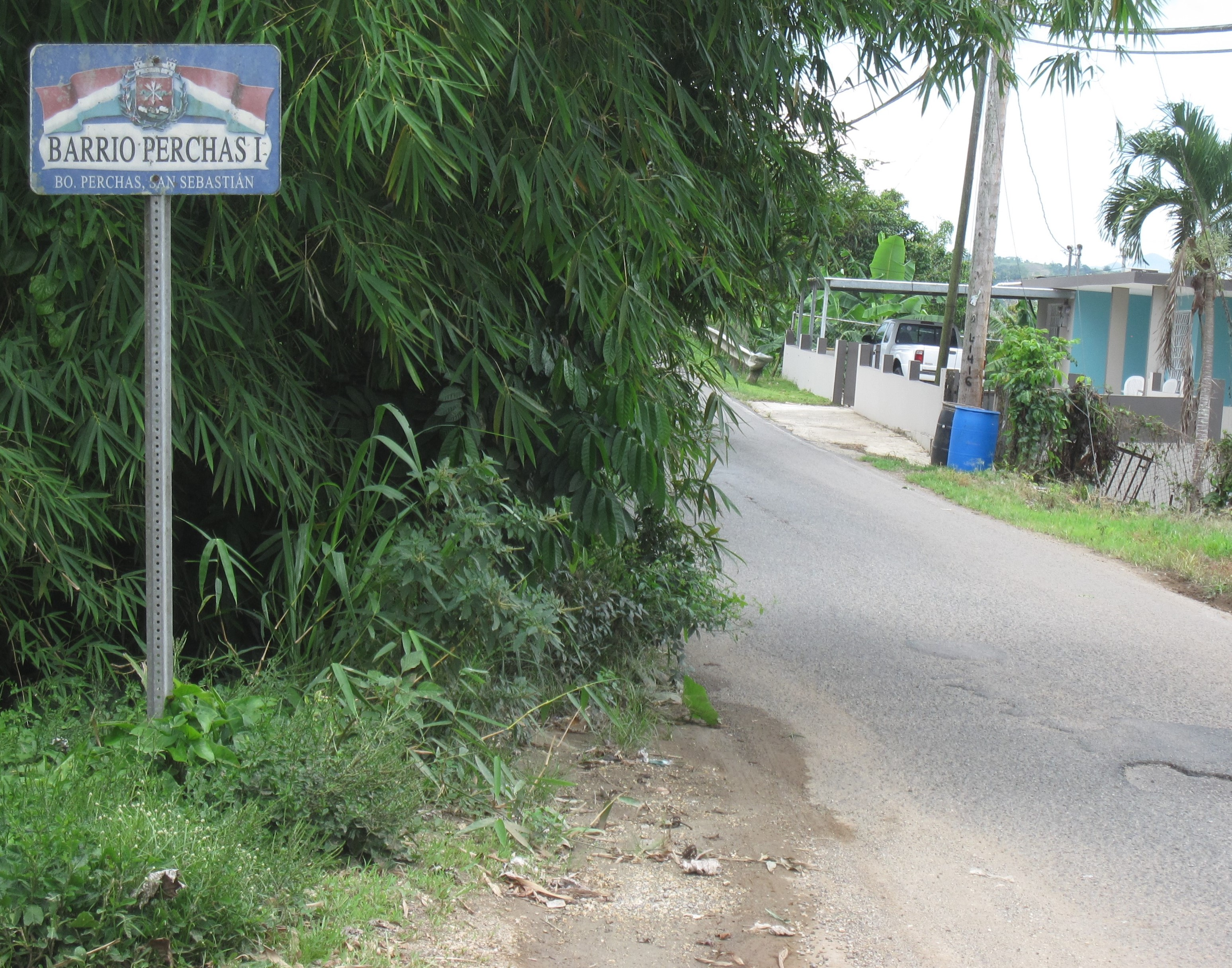
Sign for Perchas 1 barrio on PR-435 leaving PR-119

Municipality	Location	km	mi	Destinations	Notes
San Germán	Caín Bajo	79.7	49.5	PR-2 (Expreso Roberto Sánchez Vilella) – Mayagüez, Ponce	Southern terminus of PR-119; PR-2 exit 172; diamond interchange
San Germán	Caín Bajo	78.0	48.5	PR-358 – Duey Alto	
San Germán	Caín Bajo–Hoconuco Alto line	76.2	47.3	PR-361 – Hoconuco Alto	
San Germán	Hoconuco Alto–Hoconuco Bajo line	75.3	46.8	PR-393 – Hoconuco Bajo	
San Germán	Rosario Alto	72.3	44.9	PR-348 – Rosario Alto	
Maricao	Montoso	63.5 17.4 (Note: Kilometer markers represent the distance along PR-105 rather than PR-119.)	39.5 10.8	PR-105 – Maricao	Southern terminus of PR-105 concurrency
Mayagüez	Montoso	15.6 63.4	9.7 39.4	PR-105 / PR-357 east – Mayagüez, Maricao	Northern terminus of PR-105 concurrency
Mayagüez	Montoso	61.4	38.2	PR-339 west (Ruta Panorámica) – Mayagüez	Southern terminus of the Ruta Panorámica concurrency
Mayagüez	Naranjales	59.9 13.7 (Note: Kilometer markers represent the distance along PR-106 rather than PR-119.)	37.2 8.5	PR-106 west – Mayagüez	Western terminus of PR-106 concurrency
Mayagüez–Las Marías municipal line	Montoso–Naranjales line	14.3 59.8	8.9 37.2	PR-106 east (Ruta Panorámica) – Maricao	Eastern terminus of PR-106 concurrency; northern terminus of the Ruta Panorámica concurrency
Las Marías	Furnias–Río Cañas line	54.7– 54.6	34.0– 33.9	PR-397 – Río Cañas	
Las Marías	Furnias	53.9	33.5	PR-4406 west – Añasco	
Las Marías	Furnias	51.3	31.9	PR-407 – Alto Sano	
Las Marías	Las Marías barrio-pueblo	49.3	30.6	PR-124 east to PR-120 (Avenida Mathias Brugman) – Lares, Maricao	
San Sebastián	Guacio–Calabazas line	42.3	26.3	PR-433 – Mirabales	
San Sebastián	Calabazas–Culebrinas line	41.6	25.8	PR-424 – Culebrinas	
San Sebastián	Calabazas–Culebrinas line	38.4	23.9	PR-435 (Carretera Perchas) – Calabazas	
San Sebastián	Calabazas–Culebrinas line	36.4	22.6	PR-449 – Calabazas	
San Sebastián	Piedras Blancas	35.2 19.9 (Note: Kilometer markers represent the distance along PR-125 rather than PR-119.)	21.9 12.4	PR-125 east (Avenida Emérito Estrada Rivera) – Lares	Eastern terminus of PR-125 concurrency; former PR-111R
San Sebastián	Piedras Blancas–Bahomamey line	19.7 35.1	12.2 21.8	PR-125 (Avenida Emérito Estrada Rivera) – Moca	Western terminus of PR-125 concurrency
San Sebastián	San Sebastián barrio-pueblo	34.7	21.6	PR-109 west (Calle Segundo Ruiz Belvis) – Añasco	One-way street
San Sebastián	Piedras Blancas–Bahomamey line	34.2– 34.1	21.3– 21.2	PR-111 (Avenida Juan Evangelista "Nito" Cortés Rodríguez) – Moca, Lares	
San Sebastián	Hoya Mala	28.9	18.0	PR-447 – Aibonito	
San Sebastián	Hoya Mala–Guajataca line	26.6	16.5	PR-448 – Eneas	
San Sebastián	Aibonito–Guajataca line	24.6	15.3	PR-455 – Guajataca	
San Sebastián	Aibonito	21.7	13.5	PR-457 – Planas	
Isabela	No major junctions				
Quebradillas	Guajataca	19.0	11.8	PR-476 – Planas	
Quebradillas	Guajataca	16.9	10.5	PR-453 – Guajataca	
Camuy	Piedra Gorda–Puertos line	15.4	9.6	PR-456 – Puertos	
Camuy	Piedra Gorda	14.5	9.0	PR-113 – Quebradillas	
Camuy	Piedra Gorda	13.2	8.2	PR-496 – Piedra Gorda	
Camuy	Piedra Gorda	12.7	7.9	PR-483 – Piedra Gorda	
Camuy	Puente	5.9	3.7	PR-486 – Zanja	
Camuy	Puente–Camuy barrio-pueblo line	5.1 2.3 (Note: Kilometer markers represent the distance along PR-4491 rather than PR-119.)	3.2 1.4	PR-4491 (Avenida Los Veteranos) – Quebradillas	Southern terminus of PR-4491 concurrency
Camuy	Puente–Camuy barrio-pueblo line	2.2 5.0	1.4 3.1	PR-4491 (Avenida Los Veteranos) – Hatillo	Northern terminus of PR-4491 concurrency
Camuy	Camuy barrio-pueblo	3.7	2.3	PR-4119 (Calle Ramón Emeterio Betances) – Membrillo	Former PR-485; one-way street
Hatillo	Hatillo barrio-pueblo	1.6	0.99	PR-130 (Calle Luis H. Lacomba) – Lares	One-way street
Hatillo	Hatillo barrio-pueblo–Hatillo line	0.0	0.0	PR-2 – Arecibo, Aguadilla	Northern terminus of PR-119
1.000 mi = 1.609 km; 1.000 km = 0.621 mi: Concurrency terminus

== Related route ==
Highway 4119
- Location: Quebradillas – Camuy
- Length: 7.3 km (4.5 mi)

Puerto Rico Highway 4119 (PR-4119) is the old section of PR-485 through Camuy, Puerto Rico. It is a parallel road to the Atlantic coast that runs from downtown Camuy to the Quebradillas municipal limit.

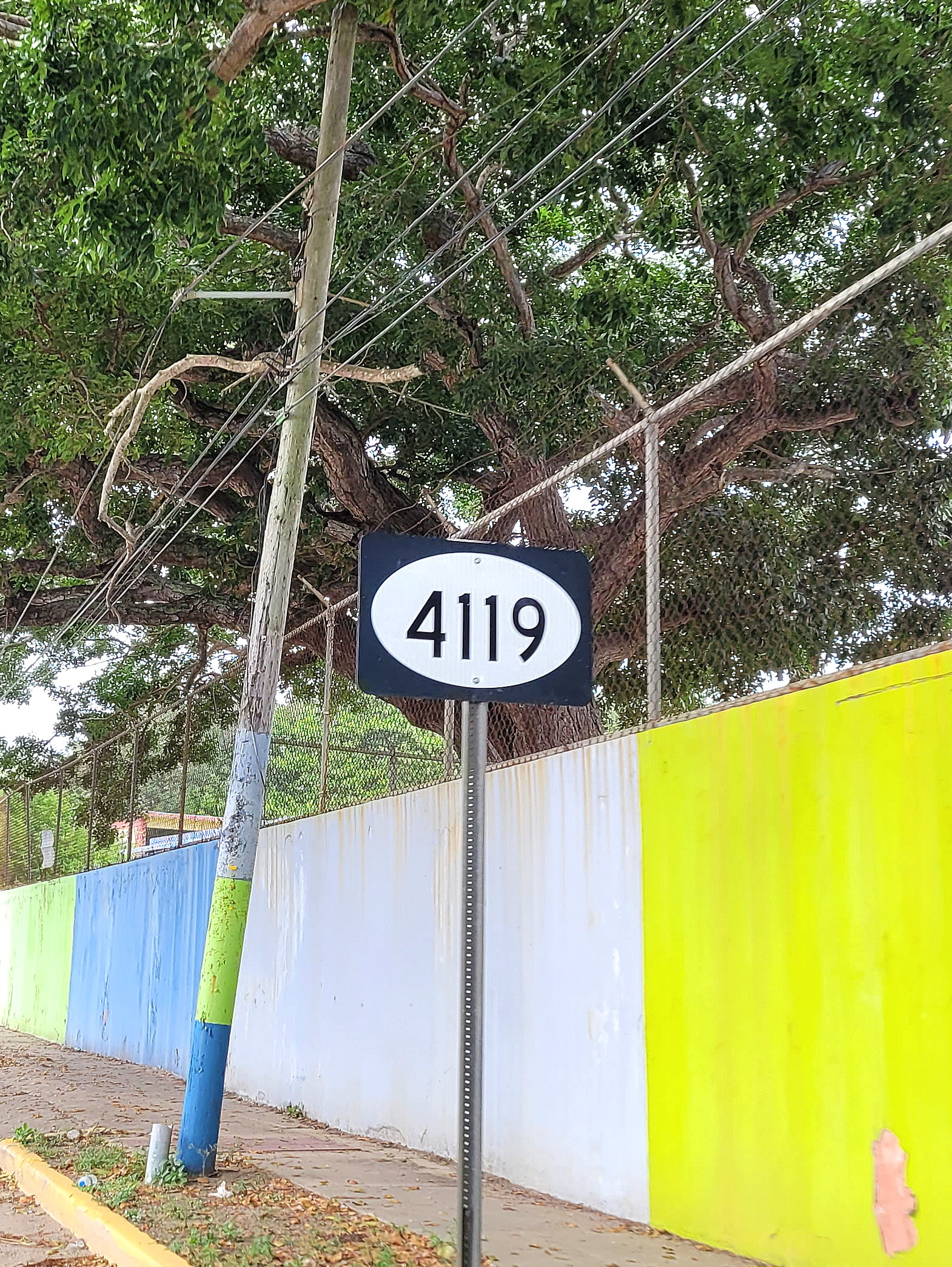
Sign for PR-4119 in downtown Camuy, looking west

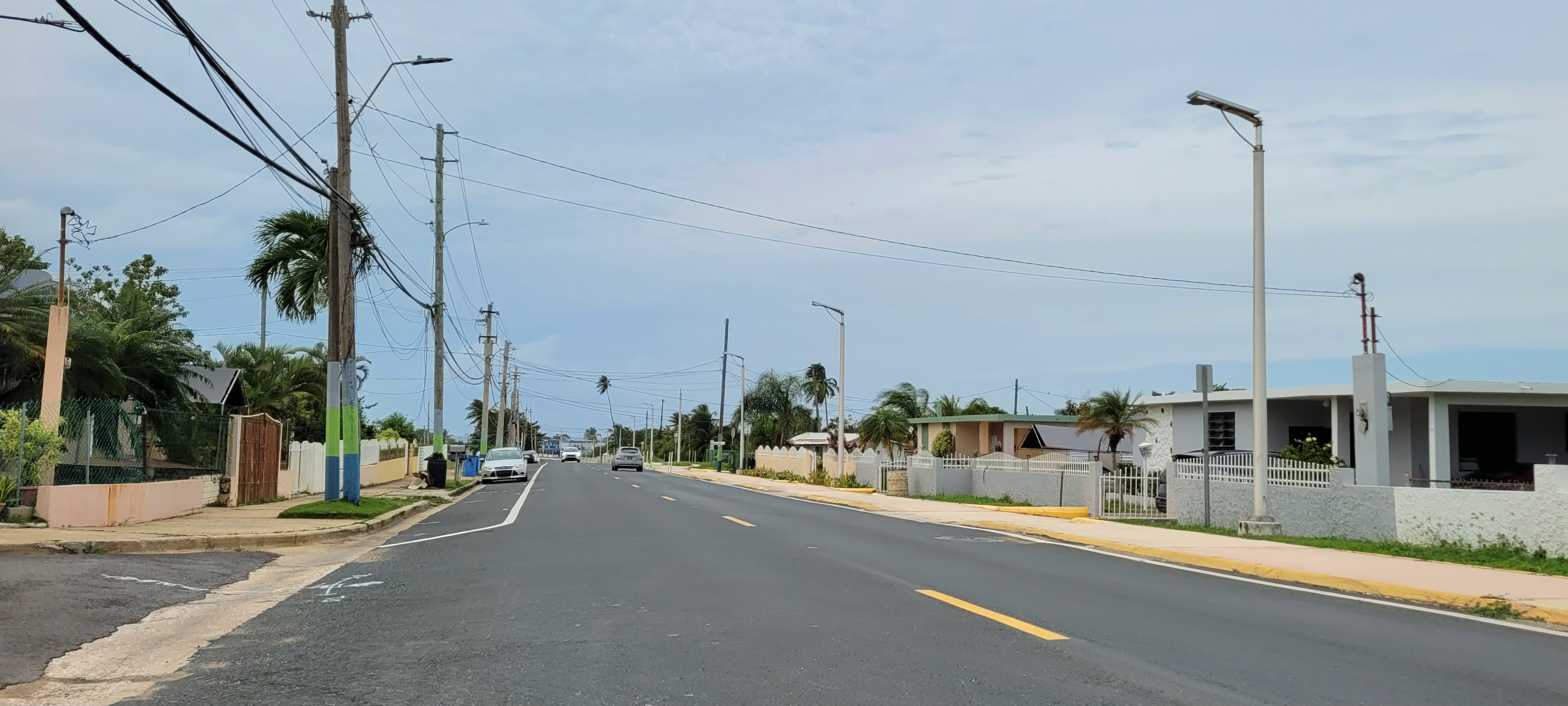
PR-4119 in Puente, Camuy, looking west

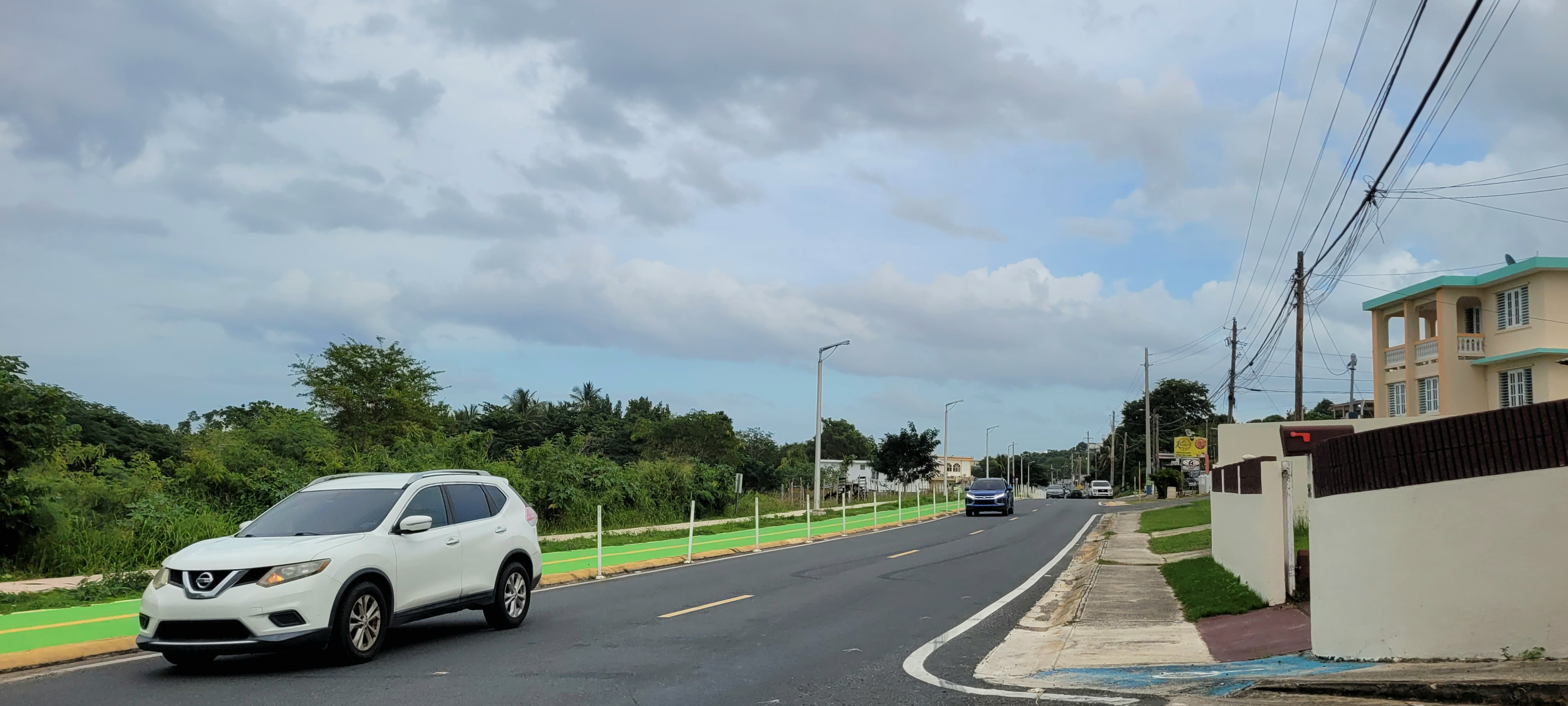
PR-4119 in Puente, Camuy, looking east

Municipality	Location	km	mi	Destinations	Notes
Quebradillas	San José	7.3	4.5	PR-485 (Avenida Ingeniero Armengol Iglesias Guzmán) – Quebradillas	Western terminus of PR-4119
Camuy	Camuy barrio-pueblo	0.0	0.0	PR-119 (Avenida Luis Muñoz Rivera) – Camuy	Eastern terminus of PR-4119
1.000 mi = 1.609 km; 1.000 km = 0.621 mi

== See also ==
- 1953 Puerto Rico highway renumbering
