= Puerto Rico Highway 106 =

Highway in Puerto Rico

Highway 106
- Ruta 106

Route information
- Maintained by Puerto Rico DTPW
- Length: 18.9 km (11.7 mi)

Major junctions
- West end: Calle Méndez Vigo / Calle Oriente in Mayagüez barrio-pueblo
- PR-65 in Mayagüez barrio-pueblo; PR-351 in Mayagüez Arriba; PR-352 in Quemado; PR-353 in Bateyes–Quemado; PR-3356 in Bateyes; PR-354 in Bateyes; PR-356 in Bateyes–Naranjales; PR-119 in Naranjales–Montoso–Naranjales
- East end: PR-120 in Naranjales–Maravilla Sur

Location
- Country: United States
- Territory: Puerto Rico
- Municipalities: Mayagüez, Las Marías

Highway system
- Roads in Puerto Rico; List
← PR-105	→ PR-107

Puerto Rico Highway 106 (PR-106) is a road that travels from Mayagüez, Puerto Rico to Las Marías. It begins at its intersection with PR-239 (former PR-2R) in downtown Mayagüez and ends at its junction with PR-120 in southern Las Marías, near Maricao. Its eastern segment, from PR-119 to PR-120, is part of the Ruta Panorámica.

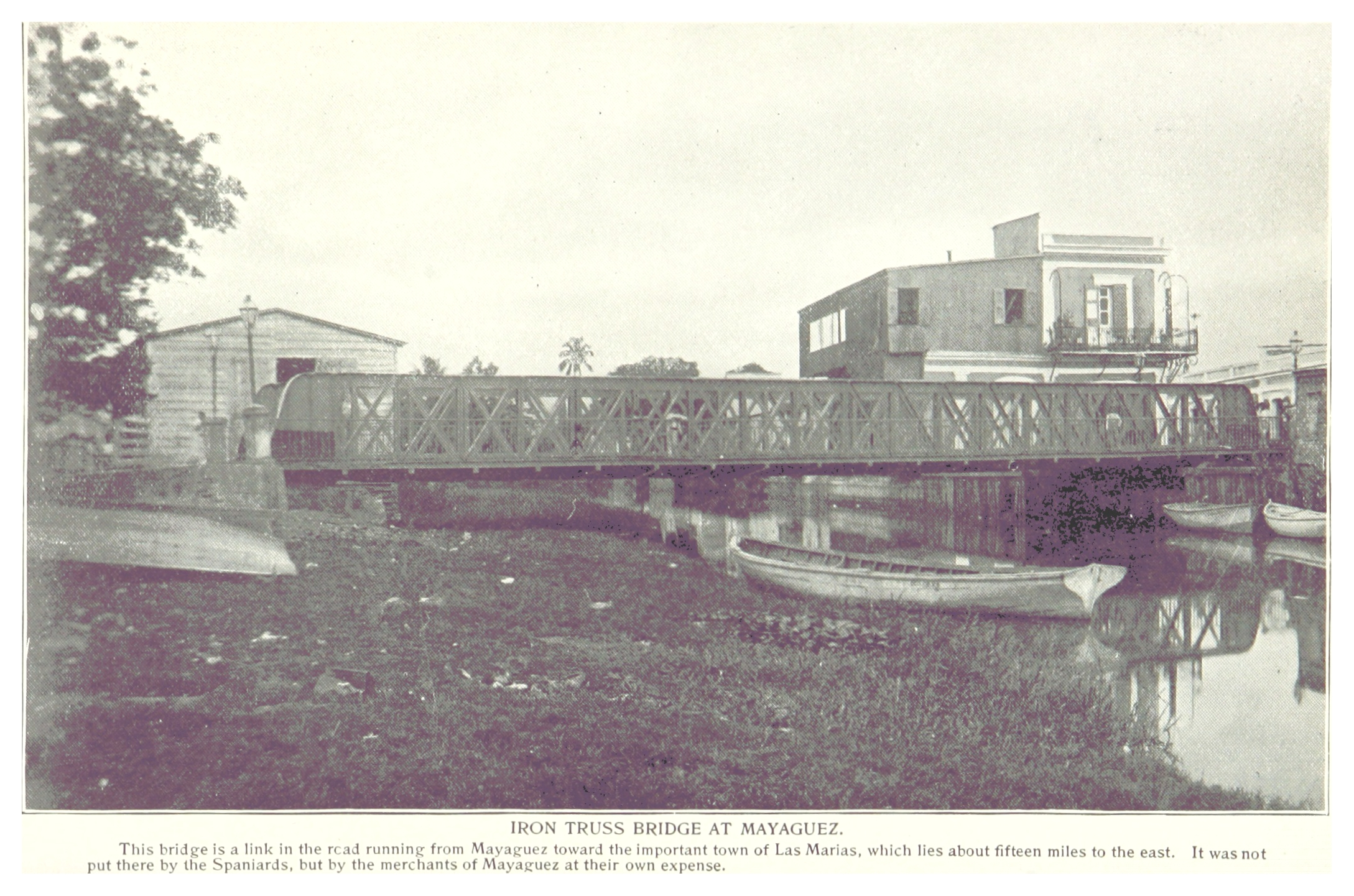
Iron truss bridge over the Yagüez River

== Major intersections ==
Municipality	Location	km	mi	Destinations	Notes
Mayagüez	Mayagüez barrio-pueblo	0.0	0.0	PR-Calle Méndez Vigo / PR-Calle Oriente – Mayagüez	Western terminus of PR-106
Mayagüez	Mayagüez barrio-pueblo	0.4	0.25	PR-65 west (Avenida Pedro Albizu Campos) – Mayagüez	
Mayagüez	Mayagüez Arriba	2.0	1.2	PR-351 – Mayagüez Arriba	
Mayagüez	Quemado	5.8	3.6	PR-352 – Quemado	
Mayagüez	Bateyes–Quemado line	6.4	4.0	PR-353 – Quemado	
Mayagüez	Bateyes	7.4	4.6	PR-3356 – Bateyes	
Mayagüez	Bateyes	8.4– 8.5	5.2– 5.3	PR-354 – Río Cañas Arriba	
Mayagüez	Bateyes–Naranjales line	10.8	6.7	PR-356 – Bateyes	
Mayagüez	Naranjales	13.7	8.5	PR-119 south (Ruta Panorámica) – Maricao, San Germán	Western terminus of PR-119 and the Ruta Panorámica concurrencies; the Ruta Panorámica continues toward Mayagüez
Mayagüez–Las Marías municipal line	Montoso–Naranjales line	14.3	8.9	PR-119 – Las Marías	Eastern terminus of PR-119 concurrency
Las Marías	Naranjales–Maravilla Sur line	18.9	11.7	PR-120 – Las Marías, Maricao	Eastern terminus of PR-106; eastern terminus of the Ruta Panorámica concurrency; the Ruta Panorámica continues toward Maricao
1.000 mi = 1.609 km; 1.000 km = 0.621 mi: Concurrency terminus
