= Health in the Dominican Republic =

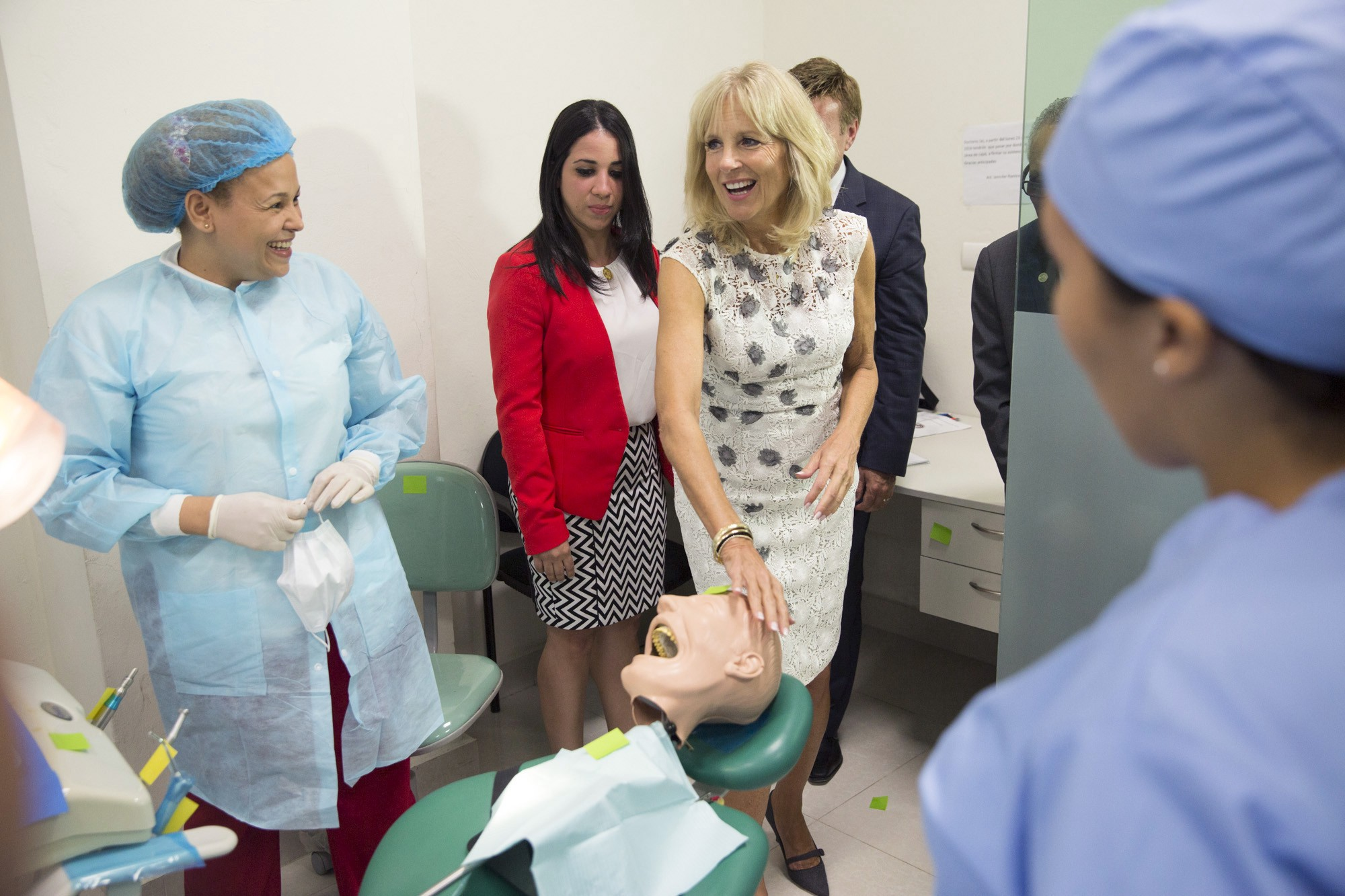
Dominican Republic medical students receive visit from Jill Biden.

Health is the state of overall emotional and bodily wellbeing. Healthcare exists to provide healthiness to people and maintain their ideal conditions. In the Dominican Republic, health haphazardness has resulted in economic disgrace. It was because of the rising of infectious health disparities. Healthcare institutions work extensively toward understanding contagious diseases that influence the Dominican economy.

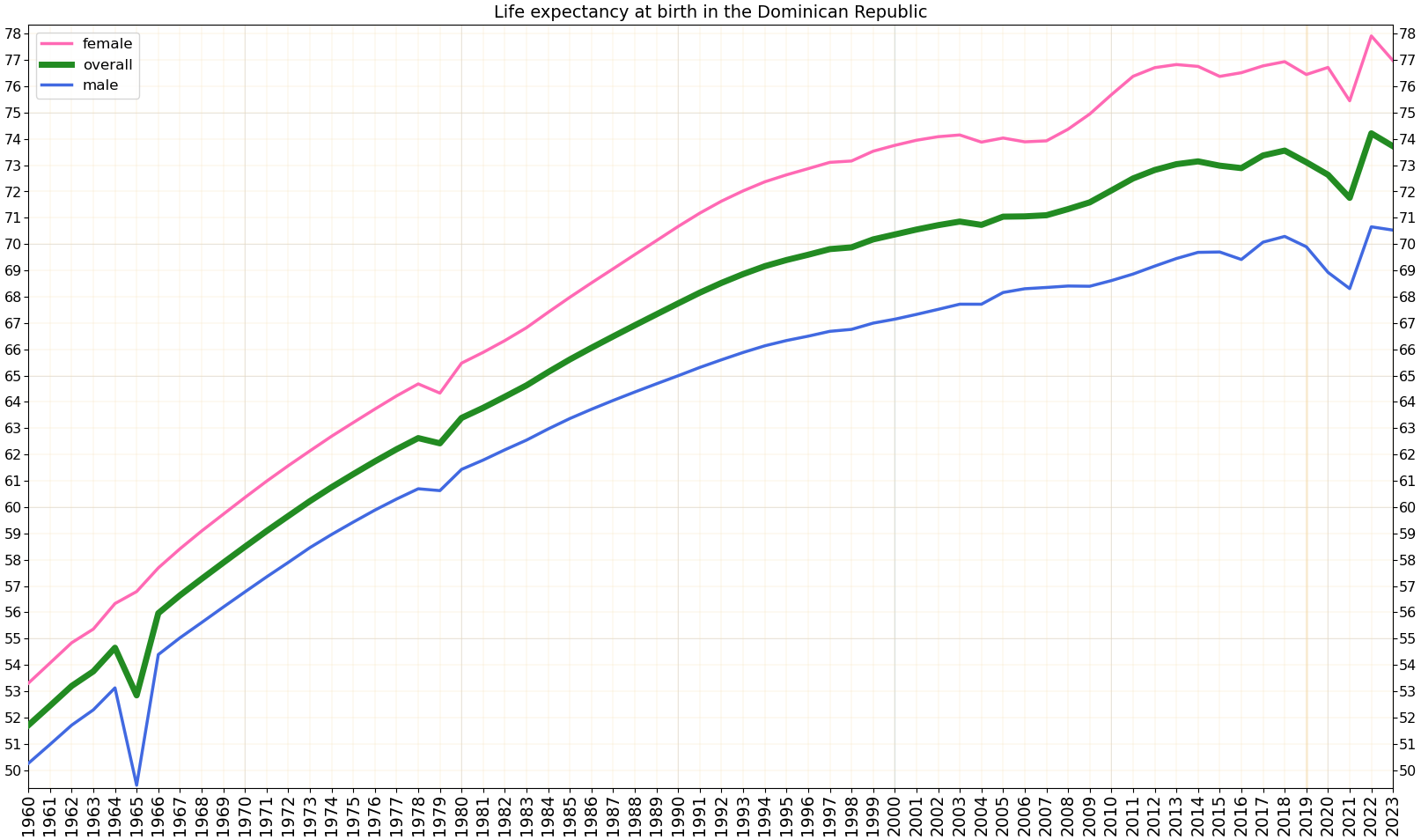
Life expectancy in the Dominican Republic

Life expectancy in the Dominican Republic was 71 years for men and 77 years for women in 2016.

In 2007 the Dominican Republic had a birth rate of 22.91 per 1000 and a death rate of 5.32 per 1000. Youth in the Dominican Republic is the healthiest age group.

The Human Rights Measurement Initiative finds that the Dominican Republic is fulfilling 86.0% of what it should be fulfilling for the right to health based on its level of income. When looking at the right to health with respect to children, the Dominican Republic achieves 89.3% of what is expected based on its current income. In regards to the right to health amongst the adult population, the country achieves only 84.6% of what is expected based on the nation's level of income. The Dominican Republic falls into the "bad" category when evaluating the right to reproductive health because the nation is fulfilling only 84.0% of what the nation is expected to achieve based on the resources (income) it has available.

== HIV/AIDS ==
The prevalence of HIV/AIDS in the Dominican Republic in 2011 stood at approximately 0.7%, which is relatively low by Caribbean standards, with an estimated 62,000 HIV/AIDS-positive Dominicans. In contrast neighboring Haiti has an HIV/AIDS rate more than double that of the Dominican Republic. A mission based in the United States has been helping to combat AIDS in the country. Dengue fever has become endemic to the republic, cases of malaria, and Zika virus.

The implementation of the siren nominal electronic testing kit was observed. However, further inventions considered, for example, the first pre-exposure prevention introduced in the critical population. The action has registered a positive impact on the economic structure of the Dominican Republic. Approximately, more than 550 people have graduated from the faculty of epidemiology owing a 38% improvement to the viral load and preparedness to deal with the pandemic (Pan American Health Organization n.p). Thus, strengthening the lab of National Public health where all samples tested has a positive deviation to the economy.

== Abortion ==
The practice of abortion is illegal in all cases in the Dominican Republic, a ban that includes conceptions following rape, incest, and situations where the health of the mother is in danger, even if life-threatening. This ban was reiterated by the Dominican government in a September 2009 provision of a constitutional reform bill. Furthermore, issues of abortion endanger the lives of teenagers. The exercise of abortion was unlawful in the Dominican Republic: the decree was to govern and protect the life of the innocent and the mother. For example, the mortality ratio has an estimate of 92 deaths per 100000 live births in 2015 (UNICEF n.p). Adolescents with low levels of education in rural areas are categorized to harbor such risks. To add on, an increase in female unemployment rates posed a hazard to the economy. Therefore, strict laws stipulated to reiterate abortion.

== Healthcare ==
There are three tiers of healthcare in the country:

- Subsidized regime, which is financed by the government for unemployed, poor, disabled and indigent people.
- Contributive regime, which is financed by workers and employers
- Contributive subsidized regime, which is financed by independent workers, technical workers, and self-employed people, but subsidized by the state

Even those for whom care is supposedly provided may have to pay for medical supplies. However, considerable progress in health and overall development was experienced in the country. For instance, there is a substantial increase in health coverage in the nation that is the health insurance coverage from 23% in 2011 to 65% in 2015 (Centers for Disease Control and Prevention n.p). Significantly, updating the list of beneficiaries was the major challenge since the list based on disease prioritization and financial sustainability. Therefore, the first fitness elements, such as migration, poverty education, and gender-based, should be considered in the strategy of hindrance suites.

Government expenditure on healthcare is about $180 per person per year, slightly more than half the average for the Latin American and Caribbean region.

Essentially, there are steps considered by healthcare in the Republic. Firstly, the sponsored organization that caters to the poor, unemployed, and disabled people. Also, the active personnel contained a contributive establishment. Though the low- classes are dependents, the majority of the population is independent on matters of health, according to the Dominican Republic (World Health Organization n.p). Therefore, government expenditure per person is slightly higher in the Dominican Republic compared to other states.

Furthermore, coronavirus pandemic is a threat to the economy. The fixed budget placed for the control of the virus shake the fragile economy of the republic (United Nations n.p). Hence economic retardation experienced having negative implications.

Finally, it is essential to improve certification and registration systems in areas with higher levels of poverty in the Republic of Dominican. It has a positive impact on the economy of this country. Therefore, based on the World Health Organization, essential solutions rendered to stabilize the economy of the Republic should be embraced.
