= HIV/AIDS in the Dominican Republic =

The Dominican Republic has a 0.9% prevalence rate of HIV/AIDS, among the lowest percentage-wise in the Caribbean region. However, it has the second most cases in the Caribbean region in total (after Haiti), with an estimated 46,000 HIV/AIDS-positive Dominicans as of 2013 (the Dominican Republic is the second most populated Caribbean nation).

== Prevalence ==
In 2006, the U.S. Agency for International Development (USAID) reported that the adult prevalence of HIV was 1.1%. In 2019, the US government-run PEPFAR estimated the prevalence at 0.9%. Some urban areas of the Dominican Republic experience HIV/AIDS infection rates well in excess of 10%.

In some parts of the Dominican Republic, HIV/AIDS has become one of the leading cause of death among teenagers and adults between 15–49 years old. Adult women living with HIV/AIDS are estimated at 23,000. HIV prevalence in pregnant women had been relatively stable for a number of years. However, 2005 sentinel surveillance reported HIV prevalence of more than 4.5 percent in pregnant women at two sites. In 2006, sentinel surveillance of pregnant women of all ages reported seroprevalence of 3.4 percent at four sites and 5.9 percent at one site. In 2008 however, in the Santo Domingo National District, antenatal clinics have noted a decline in prevalence, probably because of a successful prevention campaign.

The first case of HIV was reported in the Dominican Republic in 1983, and the first case of AIDS was reported in 1989. Trends vary based on reporting organisation, but according to the Caribbean Epidemiology Centre (CAREC) the number of HIV/AIDS cases has increased every year since 1983, except for the years 2003–2005. The areas most affected are those that see high amounts of sex tourism. Heterosexual intercourse is reportedly the primary form of transmission of the disease, accounting for 81 percent of HIV infections in 15- to 44-year-olds of both sexes. However, because of strong stigma against homosexuality, it is possible that the number of infections resulting from men having sex with men, or male child prostitutes, may be higher than listed or may simply go unreported.

In addition to an increase in sex tourism, the country's epidemic is driven by people with multiple sex partners, younger women in union with older men, sex workers and their clients and partners, and men who have sex with men (MSM). According to the 2002 Demographic and Health Survey, 29 percent of men had sex with more than one partner in the preceding 12 months. According to UNAIDS, females under 24 years of age are twice as likely to contract HIV as their male counterparts. This is in part due to young women having relationships with older men, who are more likely to have acquired HIV/AIDS from previous partners or exposure.

A sentinel surveillance study in 2006 reported that prevalence among prostitutes, or commercial sex workers (CSWs), is 4.1 percent (2.4 to 6.5 percent, depending on location). In some sites, the prevalence among is declining and equals that of pregnant women. For example, in Santo Domingo, prevalence in sex workers has been decreasing for the last eight years and is reaching the same level as in pregnant women nationally. This may be attributable to the successful implementation of the "100% Condom Strategy" by two non-governmental organizations (NGOs) active in several provinces.

For example, one community project in Santo Domingo in 2006 demonstrated an increase in condom use among sex workers, from 75 percent to 94 percent in just 12 months. According to the 2005 World Health Organization (WHO)/UNAIDS AIDS Epidemic Update, a 2004 study in Puerto Plata, Samana, and Santo Domingo found that 11 percent of MSM were HIV-positive. Infection levels among sugar cane plantation workers living in communities called bateyes average 5 percent, with some groups as high as 12 percent.

According to WHO, the estimated incidence rate of tuberculosis (TB) in the Dominican Republic (40 cases per 100,000 people in 2005) is one of the highest in the Americas. Data on HIV-TB co-infection, albeit limited to certain areas of the country, suggest that 6 to 11 percent of TB patients are infected with HIV. Therefore, the Dominican Republic has the potential for a burgeoning epidemic of TB along with HIV. National HIV-TB guidelines have been recently developed and HIV-TB activities have been included in national plans. While the country has introduced some HIV-TB collaborative activities (e.g., isoniazid prophylaxis for HIV-infected people and provision of antiretroviral therapy (ART)), there are no data on the number of HIV-infected TB patients receiving ART.

Factors that put the Dominican Republic at risk of a growing epidemic include early age at sexual debut, high birth rates among adolescent girls and young women, the high TB incidence, and active migration (including migration between cities and countryside, migration from Haiti, and migration to and from the United States). The Dominican Republic's popularity as a tourist destination, coupled with increasing levels of sex tourism, also contributes to the spread of HIV. These and other factors suggest the need to target interventions to young adults, provinces with a high rate of tourism, and bateyes.

== National response ==
The Government of the Dominican Republic has responded aggressively to the HIV/AIDS epidemic. Established in 2000, the Presidential Council on AIDS (COPRESIDA) coordinates the HIV/AIDS National Strategic Plan for the Prevention and Control of HIV/AIDS and STDs 2007–2015. COPRESIDA’s activities include implementing public policies, providing care for those living with HIV/AIDS, promoting private sector involvement in response to the epidemic, and reducing stigma and discrimination (S&D). The Ministry of Health (MOH) implements HIV/AIDS services and diagnostic tests in the public sector. The National AIDS Program (NAP) develops HIV/AIDS-related norms, protocols, and surveillance.

National-level government-directed activities include the following:

- Conducting information, education, and communication campaigns
- Coordinating care and support for people living with HIV/AIDS (PLWHA)
- Reducing mother-to-child transmission
- Ensuring blood supply safety
- Monitoring and evaluating national and provincial health plans
- Distributing condoms to at-risk individuals

Since 1995, an AIDS law has made it illegal to discriminate against PLWHA. The law is unique for the region; however, enforcement is uneven and inconsistent, and S&D against PLWHA and those engaging in behaviors putting them most at risk for HIV/AIDS are common.

The government works with a number of international donors to combat HIV/AIDS, including the William J. Clinton Foundation, UNICEF, the United Nations Population Fund, the World Bank, and the Global Fund to Fight AIDS, Tuberculosis and Malaria. In 2004, the Dominican Republic received a second-round grant from the Global Fund to scale up HIV services throughout the country, with particular focus on vulnerable groups, including female sex workers, MSM, and migrants. With Global Fund support, the government also intends to scale up ART.
