= Aibonito, San Sebastián, Puerto Rico =

Barrio of Puerto Rico

Aibonito
- Barrio
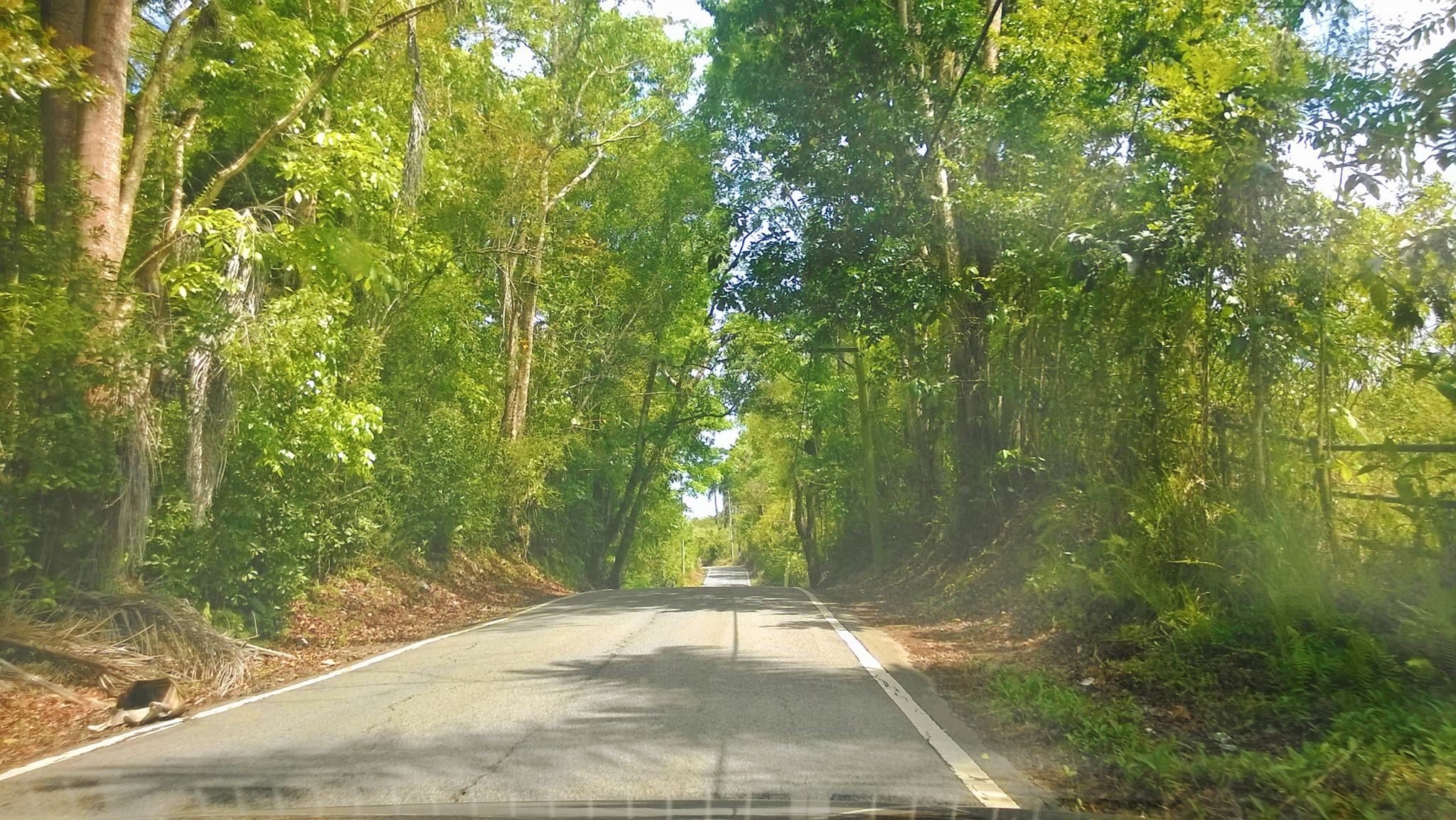
- Puerto Rico Highway 119 in Aibonito barrio

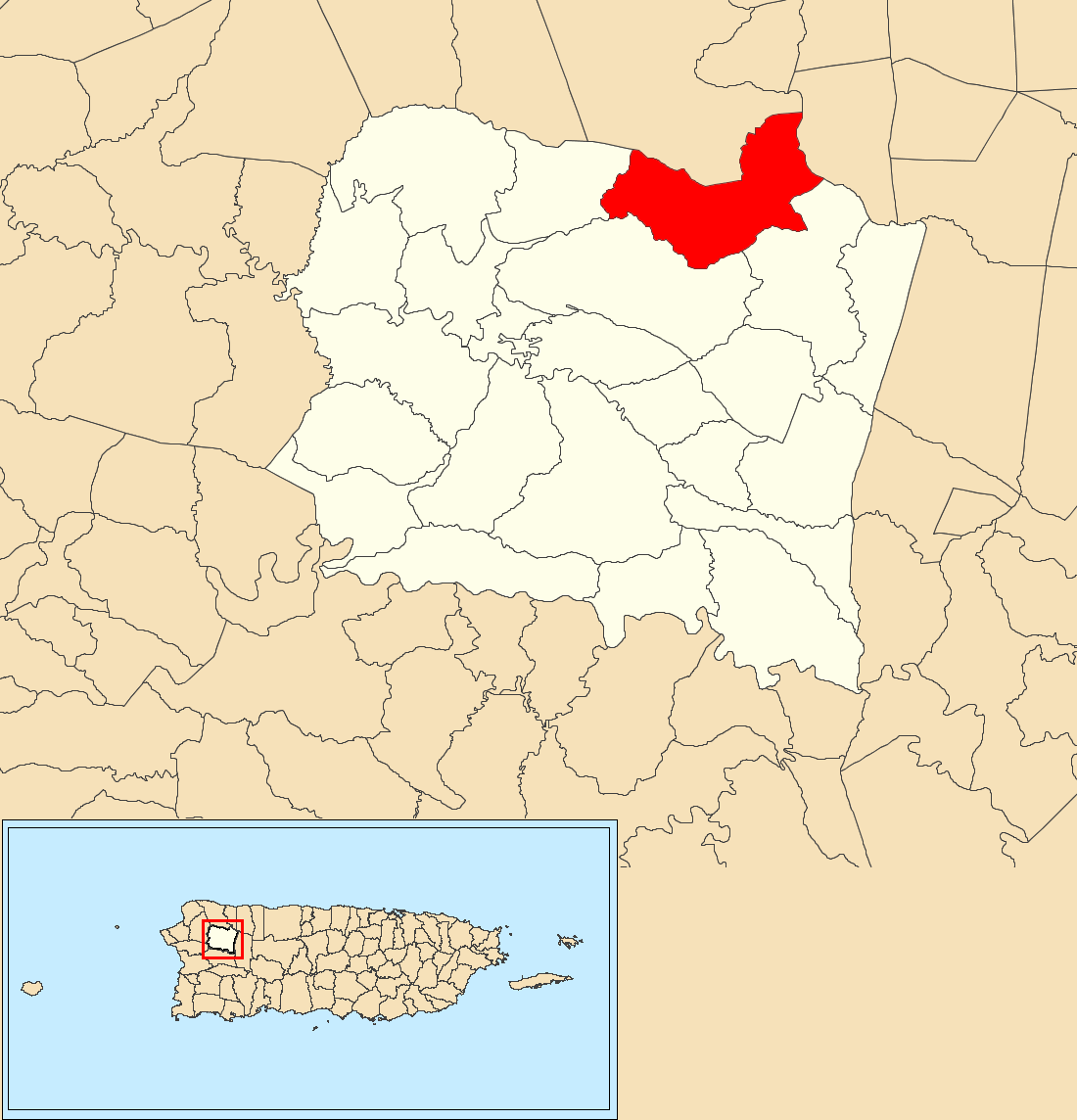
- Location of Aibonito within the municipality of San Sebastián shown in red

- Location of Puerto Rico
- Coordinates: 18°22′14″N 66°56′33″W
- Commonwealth: Puerto Rico
- Municipality: San Sebastián

Area
  - Total: 4.37 sq mi (11.3 km^{2})
  - Land: 4.01 sq mi (10.4 km^{2})
  - Water: 0.36 sq mi (0.93 km^{2})
- Elevation: 833 ft (254 m)

Population (2010)
  - Total: 1,972
  - Density: 491.8/sq mi (189.9/km^{2})
- Source: 2010 Census
- Time zone: UTC−4 (AST)
- Website: ssdelpepino.com

Aibonito is a barrio in the municipality of San Sebastián, Puerto Rico. Its population in 2010 was 1,972.

== History ==
Aibonito was in Spain's gazetteers until Puerto Rico was ceded by Spain in the aftermath of the Spanish–American War under the terms of the Treaty of Paris of 1898 and became an unincorporated territory of the United States. In 1899, the United States Department of War conducted a census of Puerto Rico finding that the population of Aibonito barrio was 993.

Historical population
Census	Pop.	Note	%±
1900	993		—
1910	1,116		12.4%
1920	1,306		17.0%
1930	1,721		31.8%
1940	2,001		16.3%
1950	2,091		4.5%
1960	1,839		−12.1%
1970	1,401		−23.8%
1980	1,788		27.6%
1990	1,838		2.8%
2000	2,116		15.1%
2010	1,972		−6.8%
U.S. Decennial Census; 1899 (shown as 1900) 1910-1930; 1930-1950 1980-2000 2010

== Sectors ==
Barrios (which are, in contemporary times, roughly comparable to minor civil divisions) in turn are further subdivided into smaller local populated place areas/units called sectores (sectors in English). The types of sectores may vary, from normally sector to urbanización to reparto to barriada to residencial, among others.

The following sectors are in Aibonito barrio:

Barrio Aibonito Beltrán, Barrio Aibonito Guerrero, Carretera 119, Carretera 447, Carretera 457, Nayo Méndez, Sector Adames, Sector Agustín Rodríguez, Sector Casa del Biólogo, Sector Ciquito López, Sector Cruz Lugo, Sector El Maní, Sector Fano Mercado, Sector Gelo Esteves, Sector Goyo Guerrero, Sector Lalo Jiménez, Sector Las Cruces, Sector Lilo Méndez, Sector Los Malavé, Sector Los Pérez, Sector Los Rodríguez, Sector Medina, Sector Millo Méndez (Cardona Méndez), Sector Morales, Sector Onofre Cardona (Mino Rosa), Sector Santos González, Sector Valentín, and Urbanización Lomas de Aibonito Guerrero.

== See also ==
- List of communities in Puerto Rico
- List of barrios and sectors of San Sebastián, Puerto Rico
