= Hoya Mala =

Barrio of San Sebastián, Puerto Rico

Hoya Mala Hoyamala
- Barrio
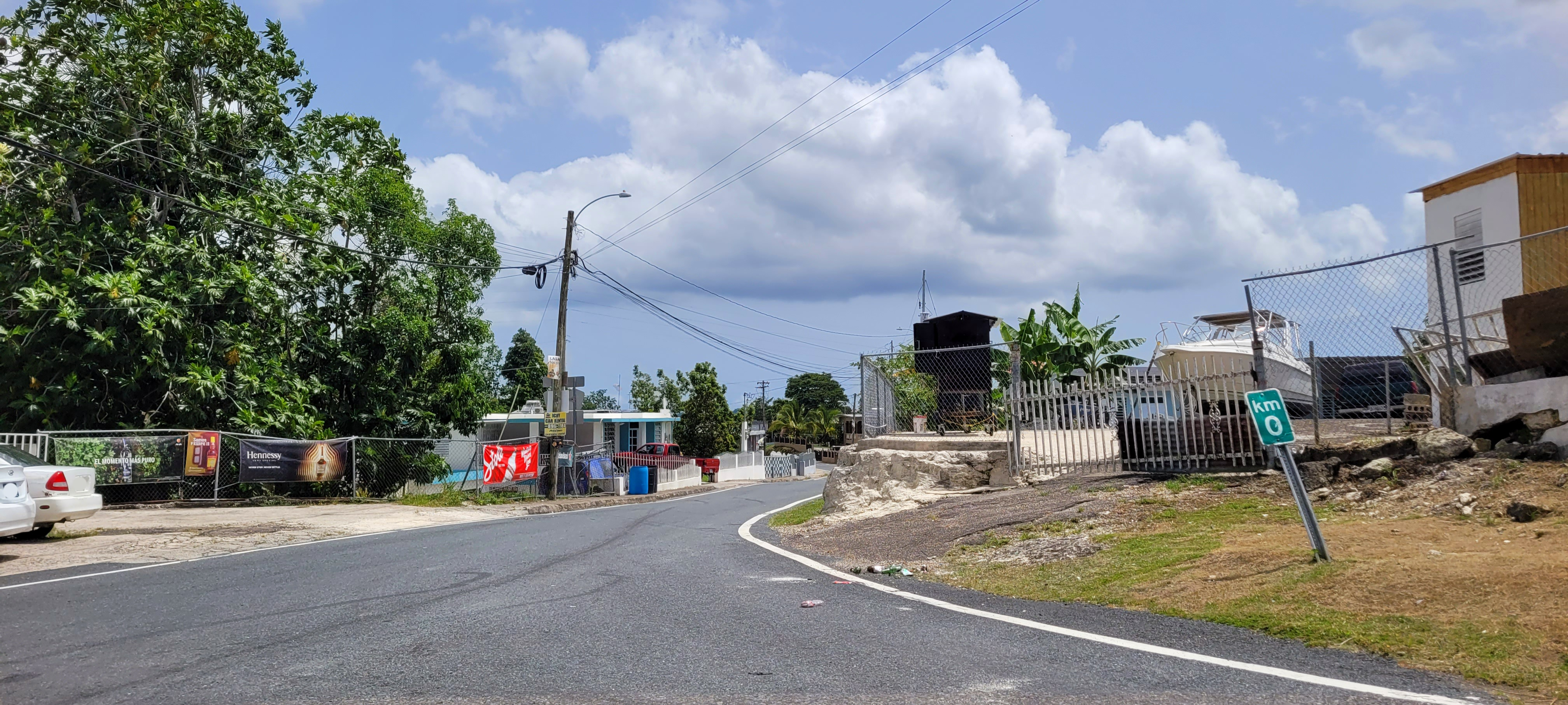
- Puerto Rico Highway 447 in Hoya Mala

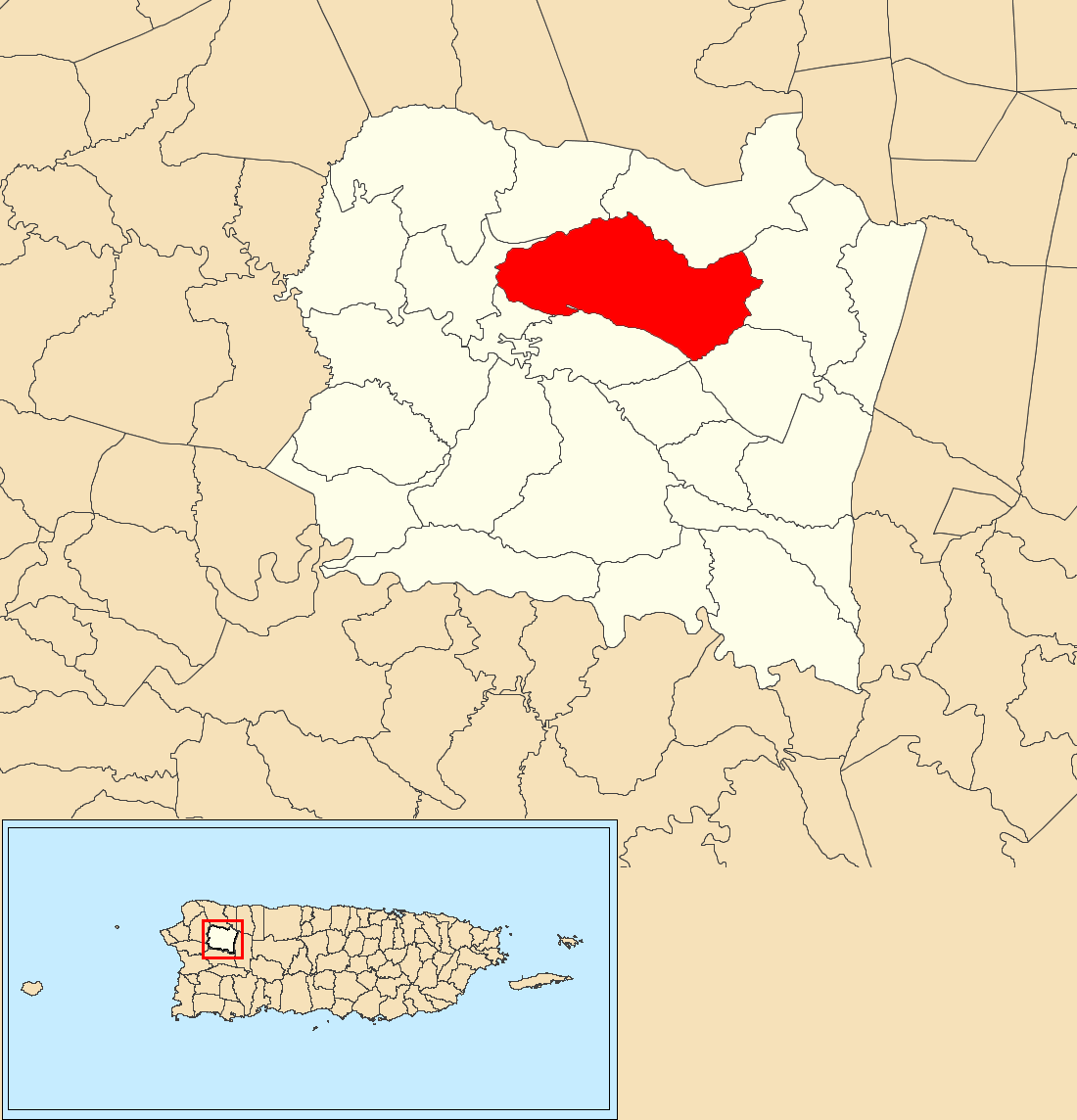
- Location of Hoya Mala within the municipality of San Sebastián shown in red

- Location of Puerto Rico
- Coordinates: 18°21′06″N 66°57′48″W
- Commonwealth: Puerto Rico
- Municipality: San Sebastián

Area
  - Total: 5.69 sq mi (14.7 km^{2})
  - Land: 5.69 sq mi (14.7 km^{2})
  - Water: 0 sq mi (0 km^{2})
- Elevation: 883 ft (269 m)

Population (2010)
  - Total: 3,594
  - Density: 631.6/sq mi (243.9/km^{2})
- Source: 2010 Census
- Time zone: UTC−4 (AST)

Hoya Mala (also spelled Hoyamala) is a barrio in the municipality of San Sebastián, Puerto Rico. Its population in 2010 was 3,594.

== History ==
Hoya Mala was in Spain's gazetteers until Puerto Rico was ceded by Spain in the aftermath of the Spanish–American War under the terms of the Treaty of Paris of 1898 and became an unincorporated territory of the United States. In 1899, the United States Department of War conducted a census of Puerto Rico finding that the population of Hoya Mala barrio was 1,215.

Historical population
Census	Pop.	Note	%±
1900	1,215		—
1910	1,387		14.2%
1920	1,497		7.9%
1930	1,792		19.7%
1940	1,992		11.2%
1950	2,329		16.9%
1960	2,303		−1.1%
1970	2,110		−8.4%
1980	2,744		30.0%
1990	3,084		12.4%
2000	3,505		13.7%
2010	3,594		2.5%
U.S. Decennial Census; 1899 (shown as 1900) 1910-1930; 1930-1950 1980-2000 2010

== Sectors ==
Barrios (which are, in contemporary times, roughly comparable to minor civil divisions) in turn are further subdivided into smaller local populated place areas/units called sectores (sectors in English). The types of sectores may vary, from normally sector to urbanización to reparto to barriada to residencial, among others.

The following sectors are in Hoya Mala barrio:

Carretera 119, Carretera 447, Carretera 448, Sector Capilla Católica, Sector Daniel Méndez, Sector Esteban Cardona, Sector Gabriel Jiménez, Sector Jiménez, Sector Julio Lugo, Sector La 21, Sector Las Toscas, Sector Lechuza, Sector Mercado, Sector Monroig, Sector Pascual Ruiz, Sector Planta de Gas, Sector Porto Román, and Sector Sharon.

== Río Culebrinas flooding ==
In late May 2019, barrio Hoyamala and multiple areas in various municipalities suffered flooding, felled trees, landslides and closed highways when Río Culebrinas flooded.

== See also ==
- List of communities in Puerto Rico
- List of barrios and sectors of San Sebastián, Puerto Rico
