= Limón, Mayagüez, Puerto Rico =

Barrio of Puerto Rico

Limón
- Barrio
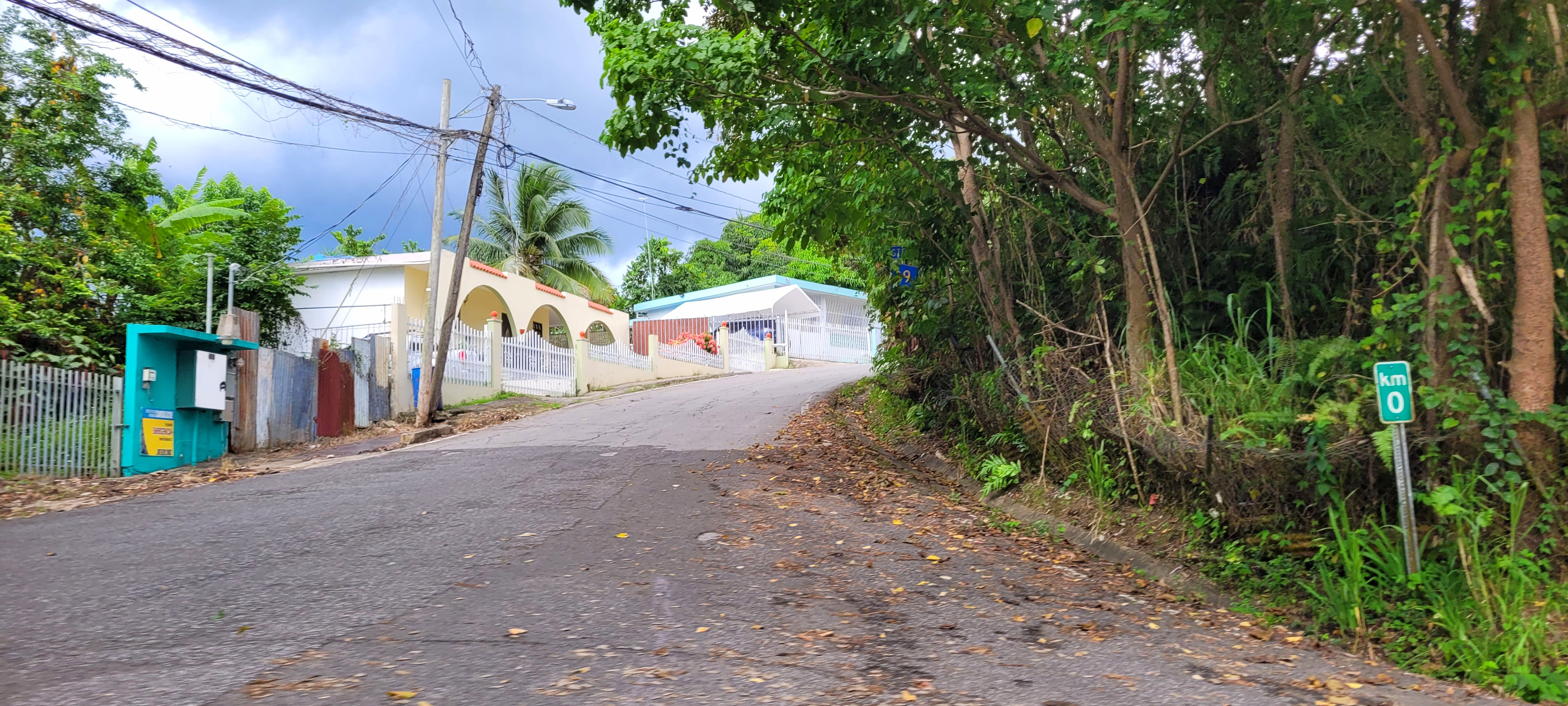
- Puerto Rico Highway 339 in Limón

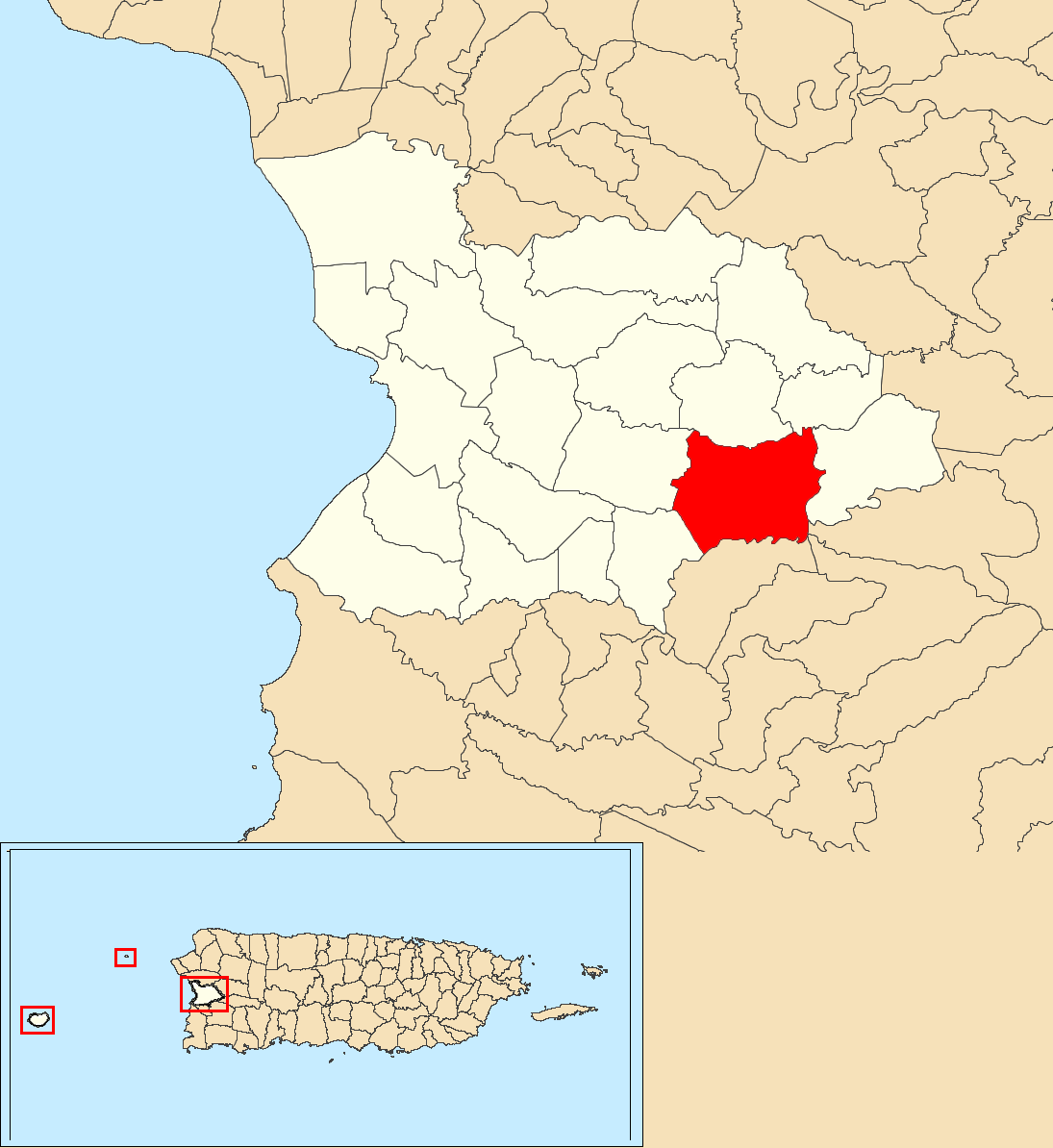
- Location of Limón within the municipality of Mayagüez shown in red

- Location of Puerto Rico
- Coordinates: 18°10′59″N 67°04′01″W
- Commonwealth: Puerto Rico
- Municipality: Mayagüez

Area
  - Total: 3.65 sq mi (9.5 km^{2})
  - Land: 3.65 sq mi (9.5 km^{2})
  - Water: 0 sq mi (0 km^{2})
- Elevation: 764 ft (233 m)

Population (2010)
  - Total: 1,377
  - Density: 377.3/sq mi (145.7/km^{2})
- Source: 2010 Census
- Time zone: UTC−4 (AST)

Limón is a barrio in the municipality of Mayagüez, Puerto Rico. Its population in 2010 was 1377.

== History ==
Limón was in Spain's gazetteers until Puerto Rico was ceded by Spain in the aftermath of the Spanish–American War under the terms of the Treaty of Paris of 1898 and became an unincorporated territory of the United States. In 1899, the United States Department of War conducted a census of Puerto Rico finding that the population of Limón barrio was 870.

Historical population
Census	Pop.	Note	%±
1900	870		—
1910	1,221		40.3%
1920	1,345		10.2%
1930	1,207		−10.3%
1940	1,235		2.3%
1950	1,146		−7.2%
1960	1,059		−7.6%
1970	915		−13.6%
1980	1,478		61.5%
1990	1,488		0.7%
2000	1,622		9.0%
2010	1,377		−15.1%
U.S. Decennial Census; 1899 (shown as 1900) 1910-1930; 1930-1950 1980-2000 2010

== See also ==
- List of communities in Puerto Rico
