= Puerto Rico Highway 339 =

Highway in Puerto Rico

Highway 339
- Ruta 339

Route information
- Maintained by Puerto Rico DTPW
- Length: 5.0 km (3.1 mi)

Major junctions
- West end: PR-105 in Limón
- East end: PR-119 in Montoso

Location
- Country: United States
- Territory: Puerto Rico
- Municipalities: Mayagüez

Highway system
- Roads in Puerto Rico; List
← PR-326	→ PR-344

Puerto Rico Highway 339 (PR-339) is a rural road located entirely in the municipality of Mayagüez, Puerto Rico. With a length of 5.0 kilometers (3.1 mi), it begins at its intersection with PR-105 in Limón barrio and ends at its junction with PR-119 in Montoso barrio.

== Major intersections ==
The entire route is located in Mayagüez.

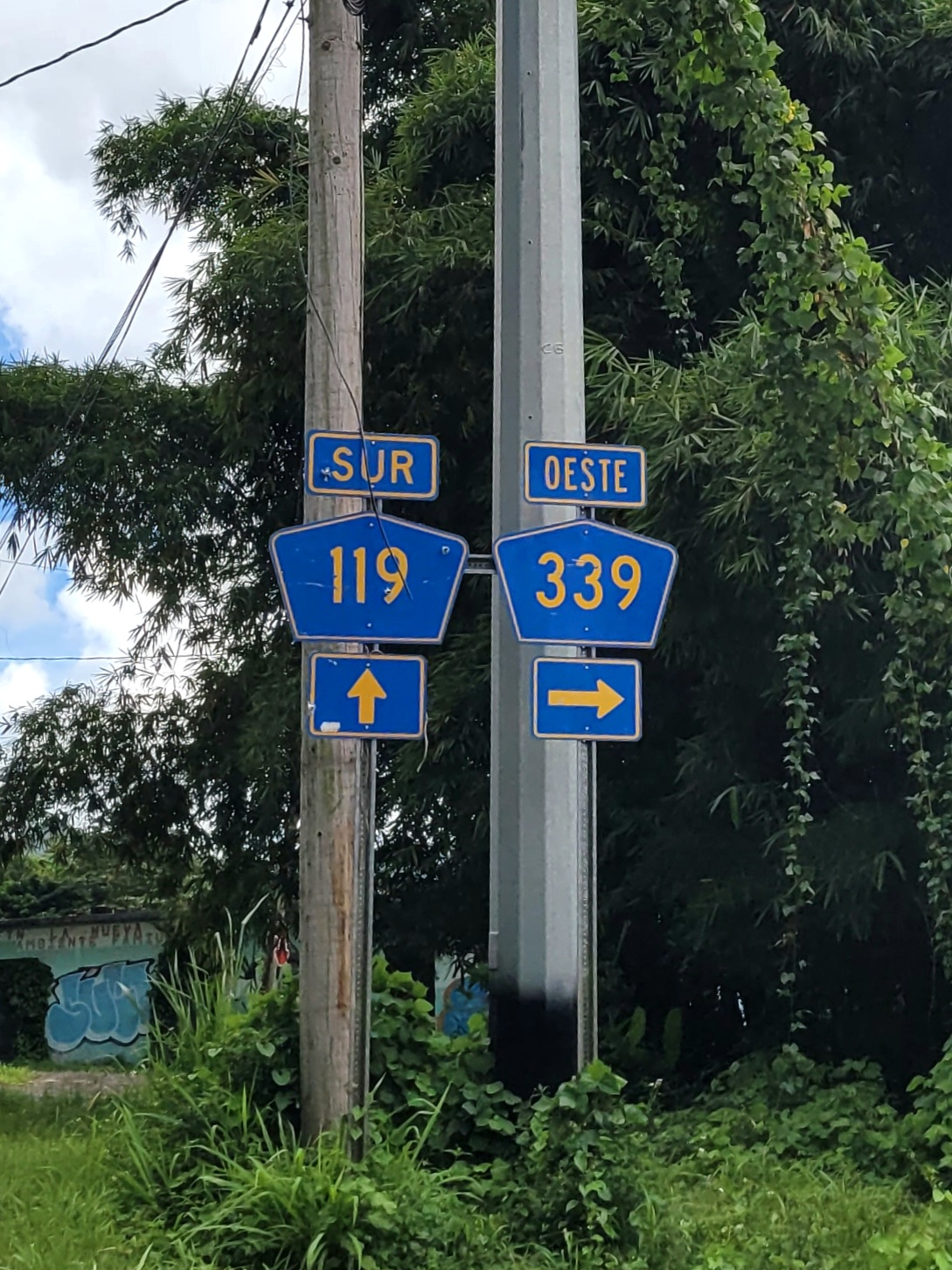
PR-119 south at PR-339 junction in Montoso

Location	km	mi	Destinations	Notes
Limón	0.0	0.0	PR-105 – Mayagüez, Maricao	Western terminus of PR-339; the Ruta Panorámica continues toward Mayagüez
Montoso	5.0	3.1	PR-119 – Las Marías, Maricao, San Germán	Eastern terminus of PR-339; the Ruta Panorámica continues toward Las Marías
1.000 mi = 1.609 km; 1.000 km = 0.621 mi
