= Puente, Camuy, Puerto Rico =

Barrio of Puerto Rico

Puente
- Barrio
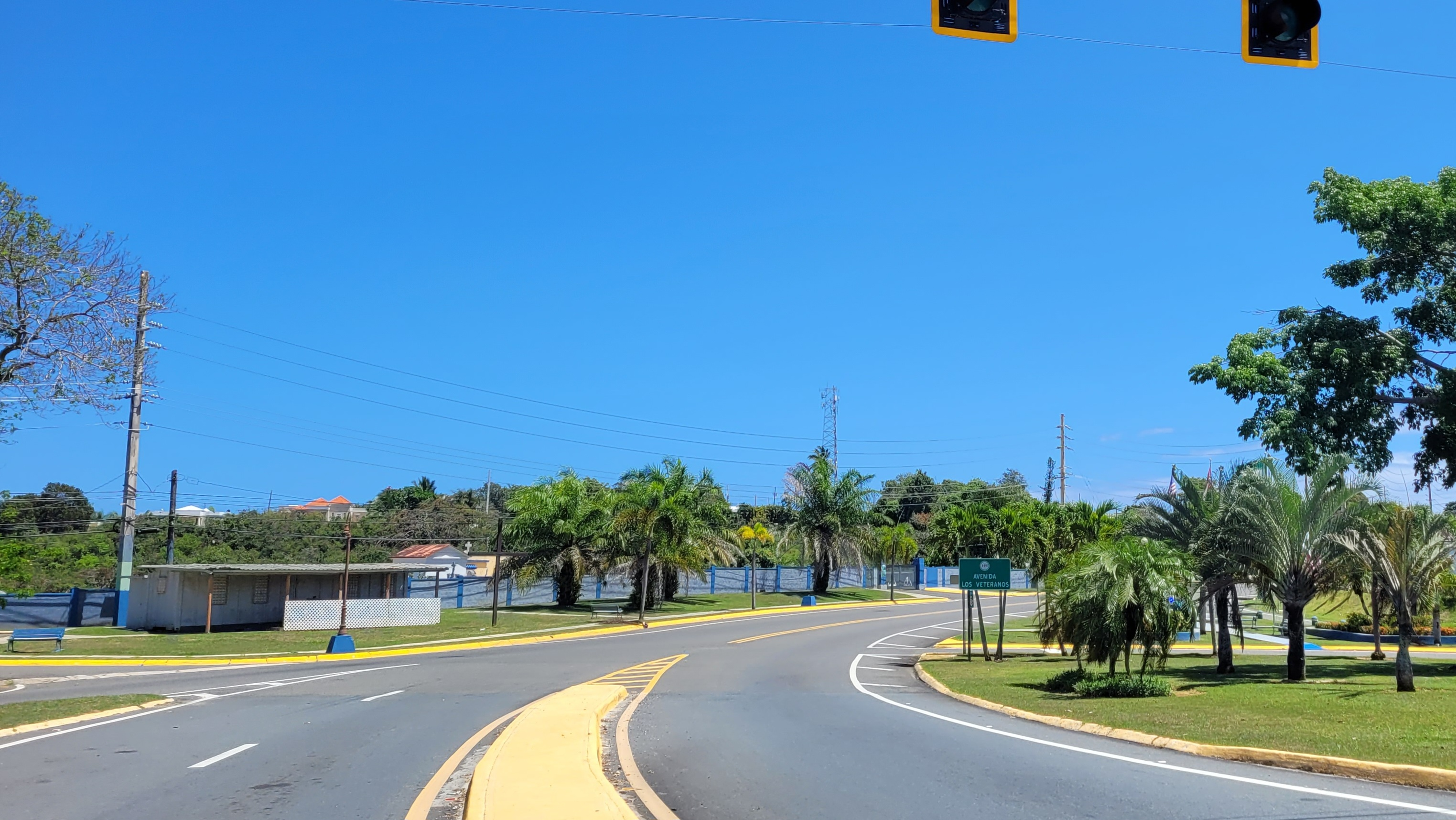
- Puerto Rico Highway 4491 in Puente

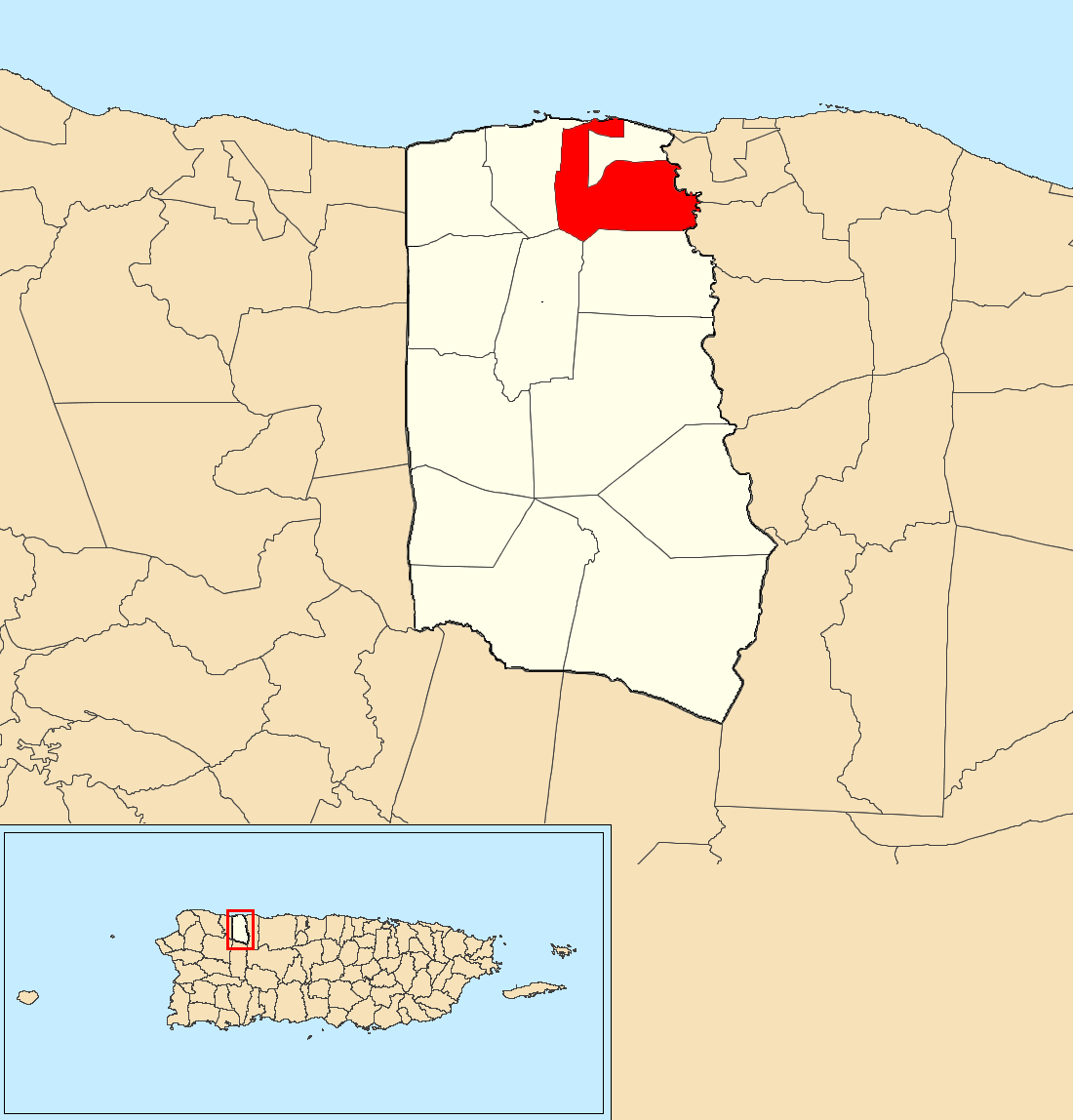
- Location of Puente within the municipality of Camuy shown in red

- Location of Puerto Rico
- Coordinates: 18°28′23″N 66°50′48″W
- Commonwealth: Puerto Rico
- Municipality: Camuy

Area
  - Total: 2.85 sq mi (7.4 km^{2})
  - Land: 2.75 sq mi (7.1 km^{2})
  - Water: 0.10 sq mi (0.26 km^{2})
- Elevation: 279 ft (85 m)

Population (2010)
  - Total: 6,876
  - Density: 2,500.4/sq mi (965.4/km^{2})
- Source: 2010 Census
- Time zone: UTC−4 (AST)

Puente is a barrio in the municipality of Camuy, Puerto Rico. Its population in 2010 was 6,876.

== History ==
Puente was in Spain's gazetteers until Puerto Rico was ceded by Spain in the aftermath of the Spanish–American War under the terms of the Treaty of Paris of 1898 and became an unincorporated territory of the United States. In 1899, the United States Department of War conducted a census of Puerto Rico finding that the population of Puente barrio was 718.

Historical population
Census	Pop.	Note	%±
1900	718		—
1910	561		−21.9%
1920	908		61.9%
1930	1,203		32.5%
1940	1,605		33.4%
1950	2,647		64.9%
1960	2,717		2.6%
1970	0		−100.0%
1980	5,540		—
1990	7,191		29.8%
2000	8,963		24.6%
2010	6,876		−23.3%
U.S. Decennial Census; 1899 (shown as 1900) 1910-1930; 1930-1950 1980-2000 2010

== See also ==
- List of communities in Puerto Rico
