= Piedra Gorda, Camuy, Puerto Rico =

Barrio of Puerto Rico

Piedra Gorda
- Barrio
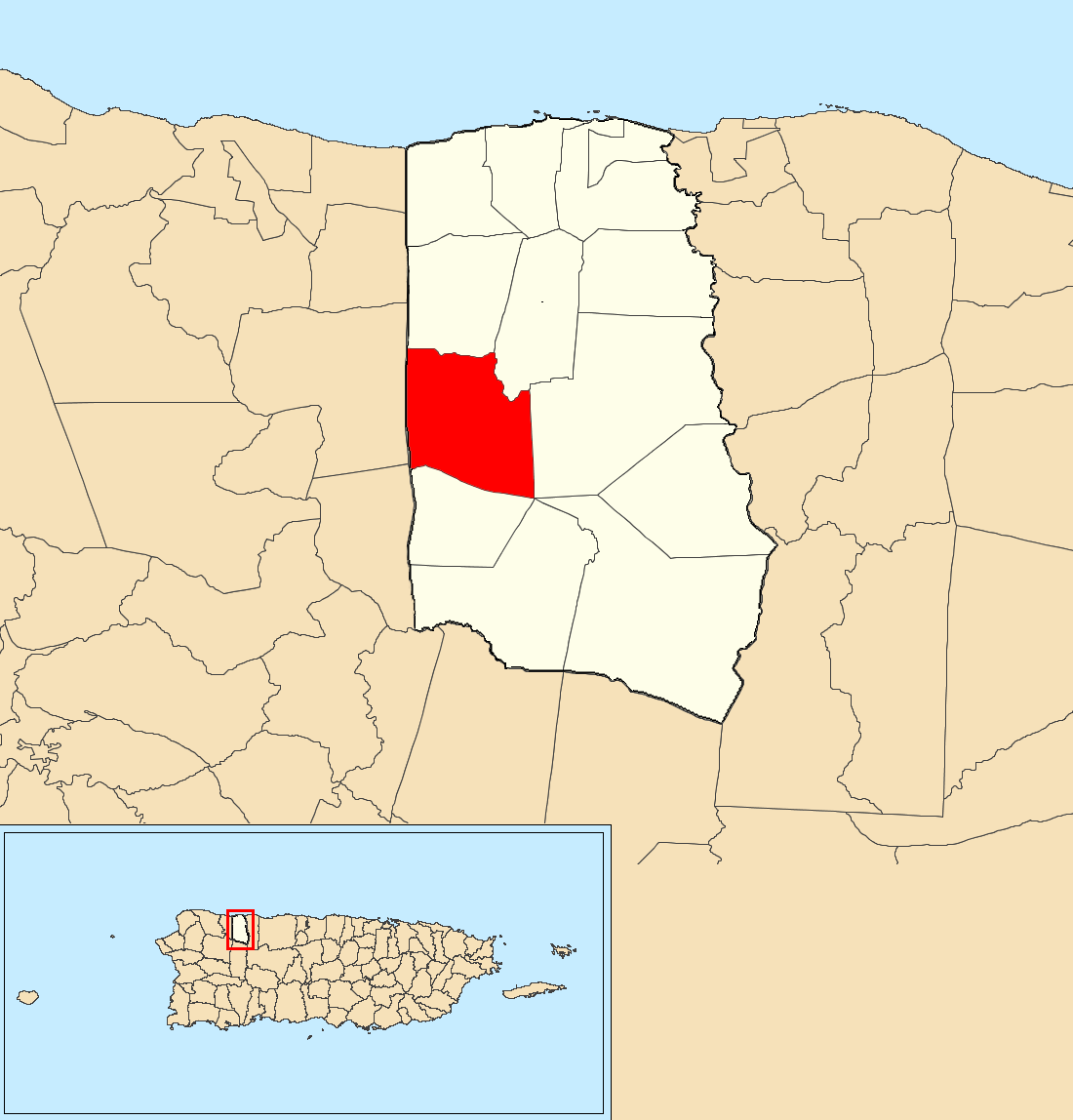
- Location of Piedra Gorda within the municipality of Camuy shown in red

- Location of Puerto Rico
- Coordinates: 18°24′39″N 66°52′53″W
- Commonwealth: Puerto Rico
- Municipality: Camuy

Area
  - Total: 3.92 sq mi (10.2 km^{2})
  - Land: 3.92 sq mi (10.2 km^{2})
  - Water: 0.00 sq mi (0 km^{2})
- Elevation: 676 ft (206 m)

Population (2010)
  - Total: 1,846
  - Density: 469.7/sq mi (181.4/km^{2})
- Source: 2010 Census
- Time zone: UTC−4 (AST)

Piedra Gorda is a barrio in the municipality of Camuy, Puerto Rico. Its population in 2010 was 1,846.

== History ==
Piedra Gorda was in Spain's gazetteers until Puerto Rico was ceded by Spain in the aftermath of the Spanish–American War under the terms of the Treaty of Paris of 1898 and became an unincorporated territory of the United States. In 1899, the United States Department of War conducted a census of Puerto Rico finding that the population of Piedra Gorda barrio was 895.

Historical population
Census	Pop.	Note	%±
1900	895		—
1910	908		1.5%
1920	1,213		33.6%
1930	1,211		−0.2%
1940	1,318		8.8%
1950	1,531		16.2%
1960	1,299		−15.2%
1970	1,773		36.5%
1980	1,708		−3.7%
1990	1,667		−2.4%
2000	1,722		3.3%
2010	1,846		7.2%
U.S. Decennial Census; 1899 (shown as 1900) 1910-1930; 1930-1950 1980-2000 2010

== See also ==
- List of communities in Puerto Rico
