= Quemado, Mayagüez, Puerto Rico =

Barrio of Puerto Rico

Quemado
- Barrio
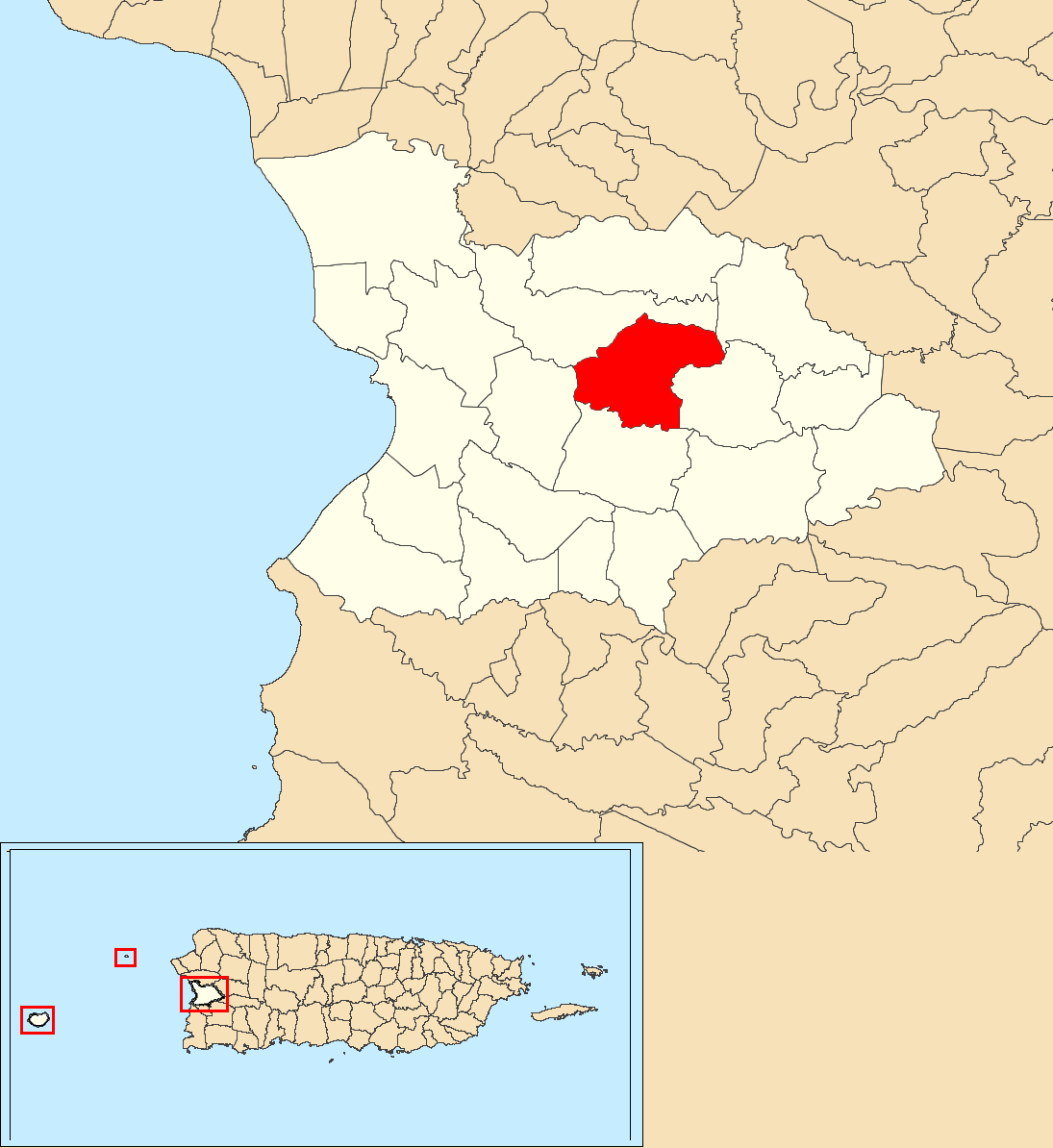
- Location of Quemado within the municipality of Mayagüez shown in red

- Location of Puerto Rico
- Coordinates: 18°13′00″N 67°05′47″W
- Commonwealth: Puerto Rico
- Municipality: Mayagüez

Area
  - Total: 2.77 sq mi (7.2 km^{2})
  - Land: 2.77 sq mi (7.2 km^{2})
  - Water: 0 sq mi (0 km^{2})
- Elevation: 528 ft (161 m)

Population (2010)
  - Total: 2,518
  - Density: 909/sq mi (351/km^{2})
- Source: 2010 Census
- Time zone: UTC−4 (AST)

Quemado is a barrio in the municipality of Mayagüez, Puerto Rico. Its population in 2010 was 2518.

== History ==
Quemado was in Spain's gazetteers until Puerto Rico was ceded by Spain in the aftermath of the Spanish–American War under the terms of the Treaty of Paris of 1898 and became an unincorporated territory of the United States. In 1899, the United States Department of War conducted a census of Puerto Rico finding that the population of Quemado barrio was 952.

Historical population
| Census | Pop. | Note | %± |
|---|---|---|---|
| 1900 | 952 | | — |
| 1910 | 765 | | −19.6% |
| 1920 | 699 | | −8.6% |
| 1930 | 641 | | −8.3% |
| 1940 | 1,233 | | 92.4% |
| 1950 | 1,536 | | 24.6% |
| 1960 | 1,193 | | −22.3% |
| 1970 | 1,652 | | 38.5% |
| 1980 | 2,009 | | 21.6% |
| 1990 | 3,185 | | 58.5% |
| 2000 | 3,017 | | −5.3% |
| 2010 | 2,518 | | −16.5% |
U.S. Decennial Census; 1899 (shown as 1900) 1910-1930; 1930-1950 1980-2000 2010

== See also ==
- List of communities in Puerto Rico
