= Caín Bajo =

Barrio of San Germán, Puerto Rico

- Barrio
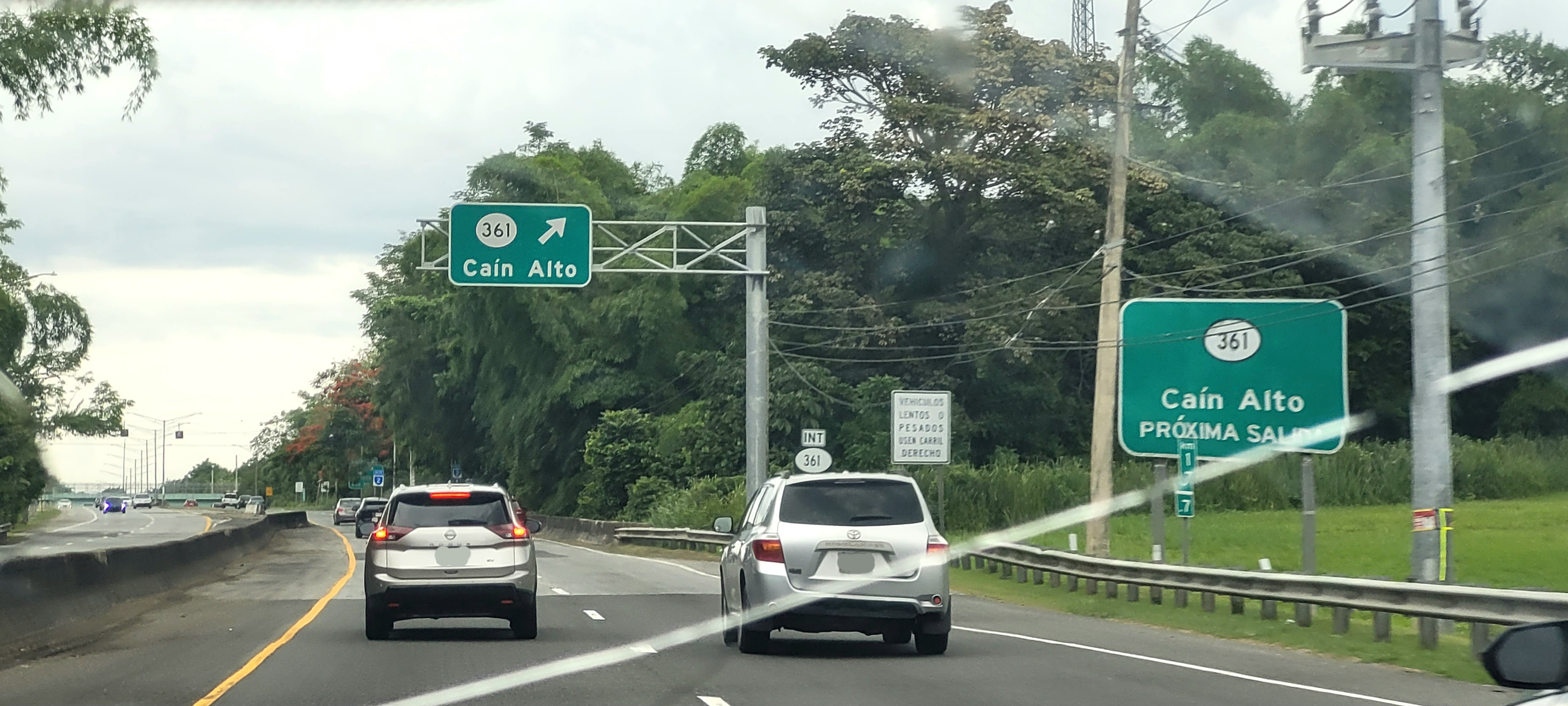
- Puerto Rico Highway 2 in Caín Bajo

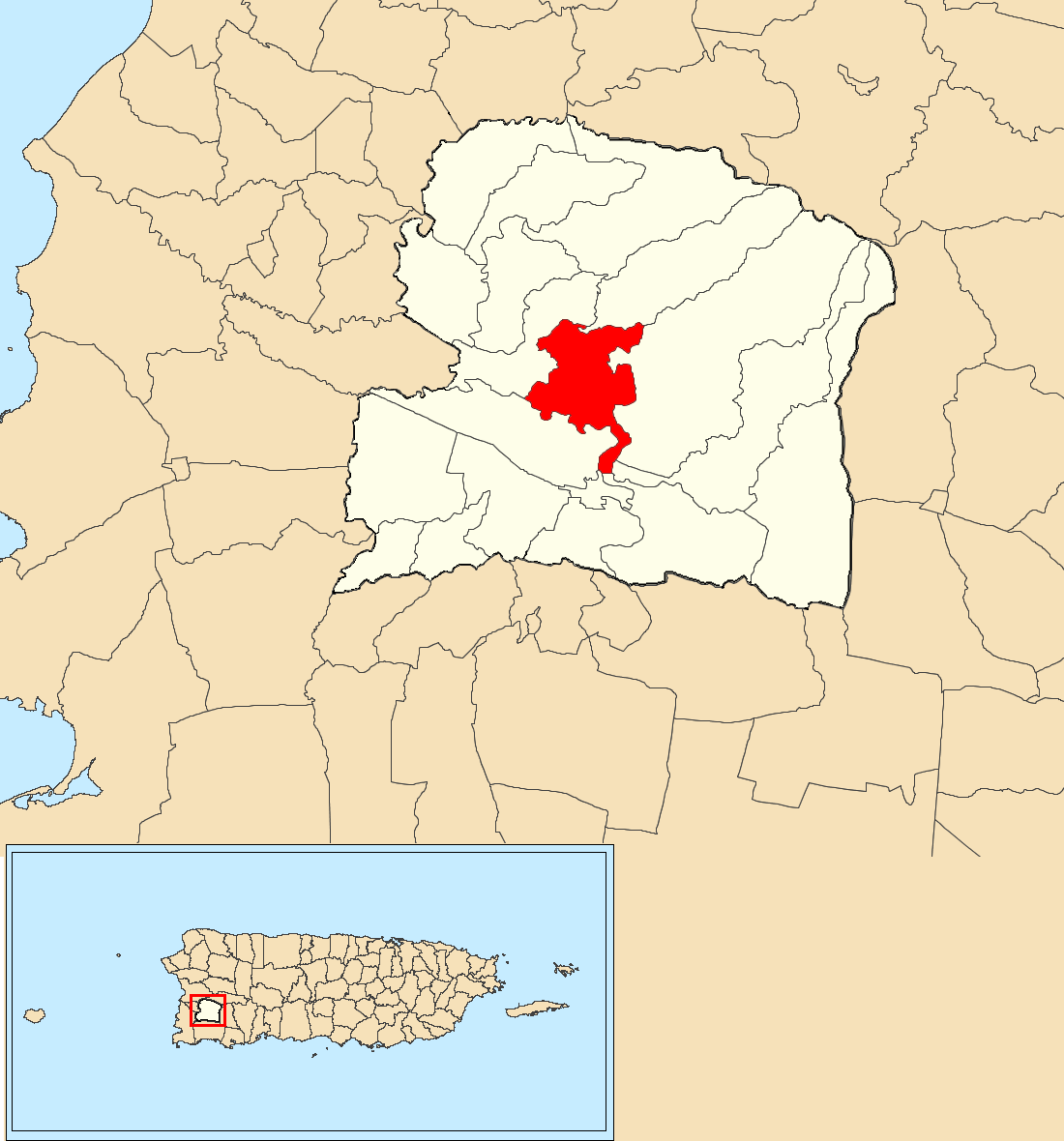
- Location of Caín Bajo within the municipality of San Germán shown in red

- Location of Puerto Rico
- Coordinates: 18°06′32″N 67°02′46″W
- Commonwealth: Puerto Rico
- Municipality: San Germán

Area
  - Total: 2.4 sq mi (6.2 km^{2})
  - Land: 2.4 sq mi (6.2 km^{2})
  - Water: 0 sq mi (0 km^{2})
- Elevation: 200 ft (61 m)

Population (2010)
  - Total: 1,207
  - Density: 500.8/sq mi (193.4/km^{2})
- Source: 2010 Census
- Time zone: UTC−4 (AST)

Caín Bajo is a barrio in the municipality of San Germán, Puerto Rico. Its population in 2010 was 1,207.

== History ==
Caín Bajo was in Spain's gazetteers until Puerto Rico was ceded by Spain in the aftermath of the Spanish–American War under the terms of the Treaty of Paris of 1898 and became an unincorporated territory of the United States. In 1899, the United States Department of War conducted a census of Puerto Rico finding that the population of Caín Bajo barrio was 942.

Historical population
Census	Pop.	Note	%±
1900	942		—
1910	1,014		7.6%
1920	1,024		1.0%
1930	1,079		5.4%
1940	1,115		3.3%
1950	1,255		12.6%
1960	1,138		−9.3%
1970	0		−100.0%
1980	1,047		—
1990	1,401		33.8%
2000	1,130		−19.3%
2010	1,207		6.8%
U.S. Decennial Census; 1899 (shown as 1900) 1910-1930; 1930-1950 1980-2000 2010

== See also ==
- List of communities in Puerto Rico
