= Hoconuco Alto =

Barrio of San Germán, Puerto Rico

- Barrio
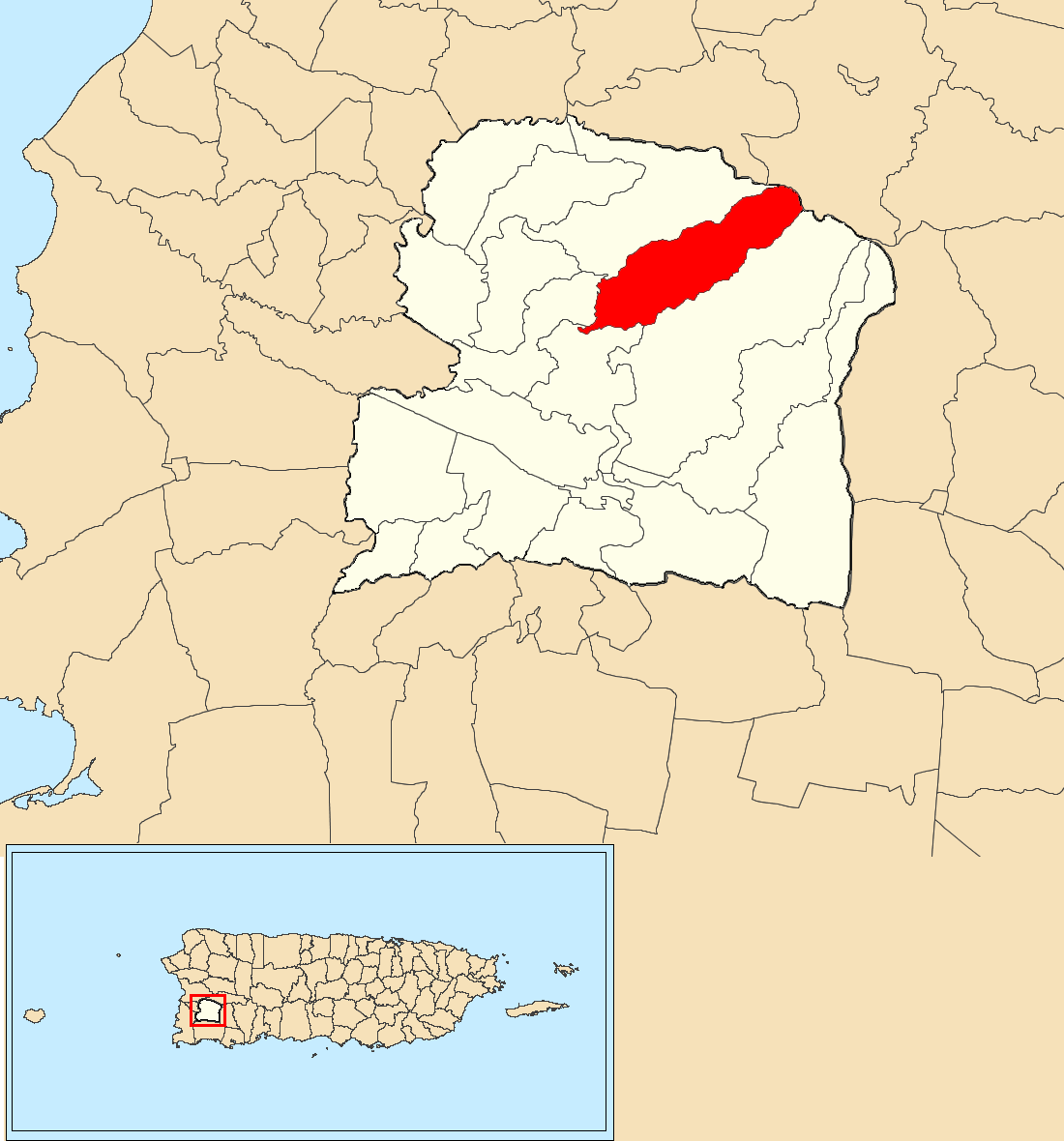
- Location of Hoconuco Alto within the municipality of San Germán shown in red

- Location of Puerto Rico
- Coordinates: 18°08′37″N 67°00′47″W
- Commonwealth: Puerto Rico
- Municipality: San Germán

Area
  - Total: 3.42 sq mi (8.9 km^{2})
  - Land: 3.42 sq mi (8.9 km^{2})
  - Water: 0 sq mi (0 km^{2})
- Elevation: 715 ft (218 m)

Population (2010)
  - Total: 572
  - Density: 167.3/sq mi (64.6/km^{2})
- Source: 2010 Census
- Time zone: UTC−04:00 (AST)

Hoconuco Alto is a barrio in the municipality of San Germán, Puerto Rico. Its population in 2010 was 572.

== History ==
Hoconuco Alto was in Spain's gazetteers until Puerto Rico was ceded by Spain in the aftermath of the Spanish–American War under the terms of the 1898 Treaty of Paris and became an unincorporated territory of the United States. In 1899, the United States Department of War conducted a census of Puerto Rico finding that the population of Hoconuco Alto barrio was 943.

Historical population
Census	Pop.	Note	%±
1900	943		—
1910	885		−6.2%
1920	993		12.2%
1930	865		−12.9%
1940	900		4.0%
1950	1,002		11.3%
1960	710		−29.1%
1970	651		−8.3%
1980	749		15.1%
1990	741		−1.1%
2000	742		0.1%
2010	572		−22.9%
U.S. Decennial Census; 1899 (shown as 1900) 1910-1930; 1930-1950 1980-2000 2010

== Features ==
PR-361 is in Hoconuco Alto barrio.

== See also ==
- List of communities in Puerto Rico
