= Furnias =

Barrio of Las Marías, Puerto Rico

- Barrio
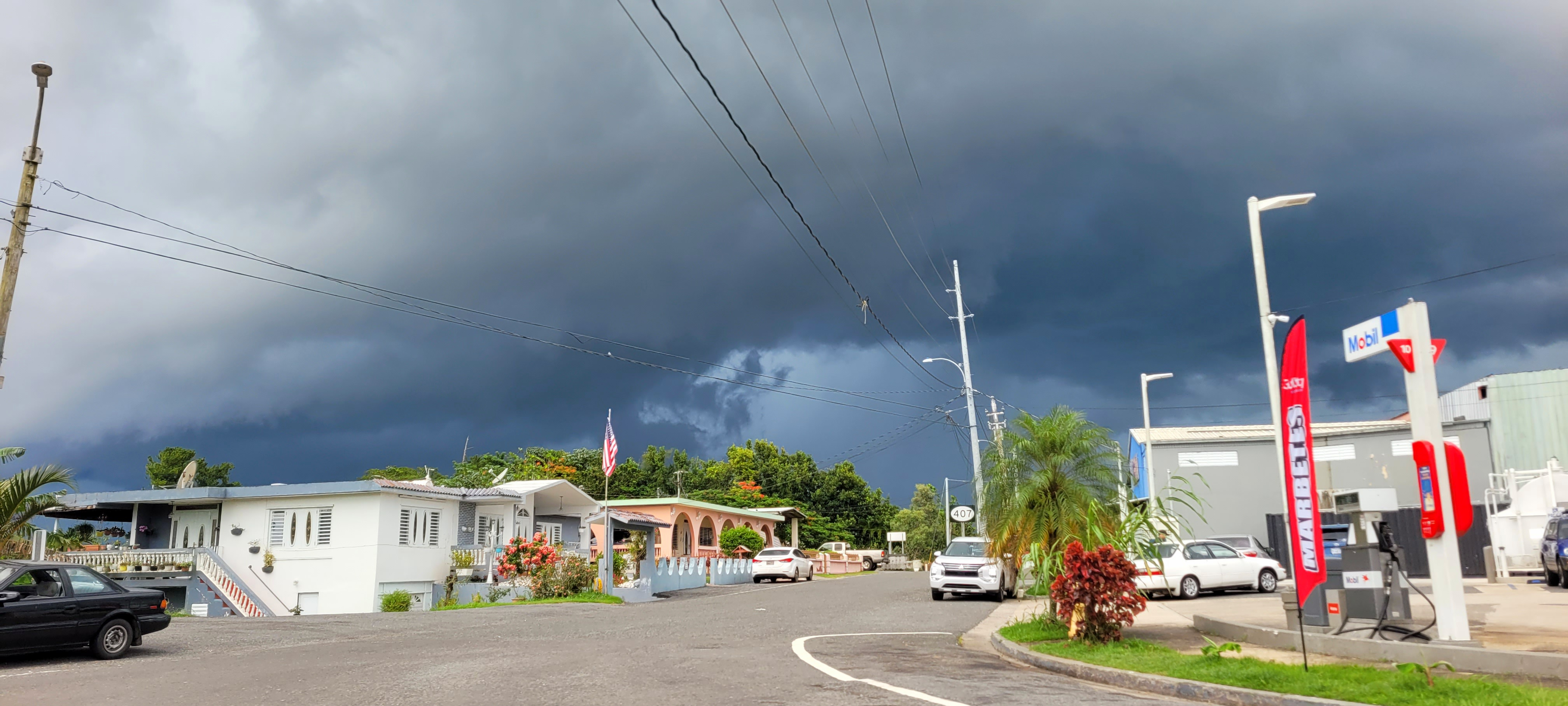
- Puerto Rico Highway 407 in Furnias

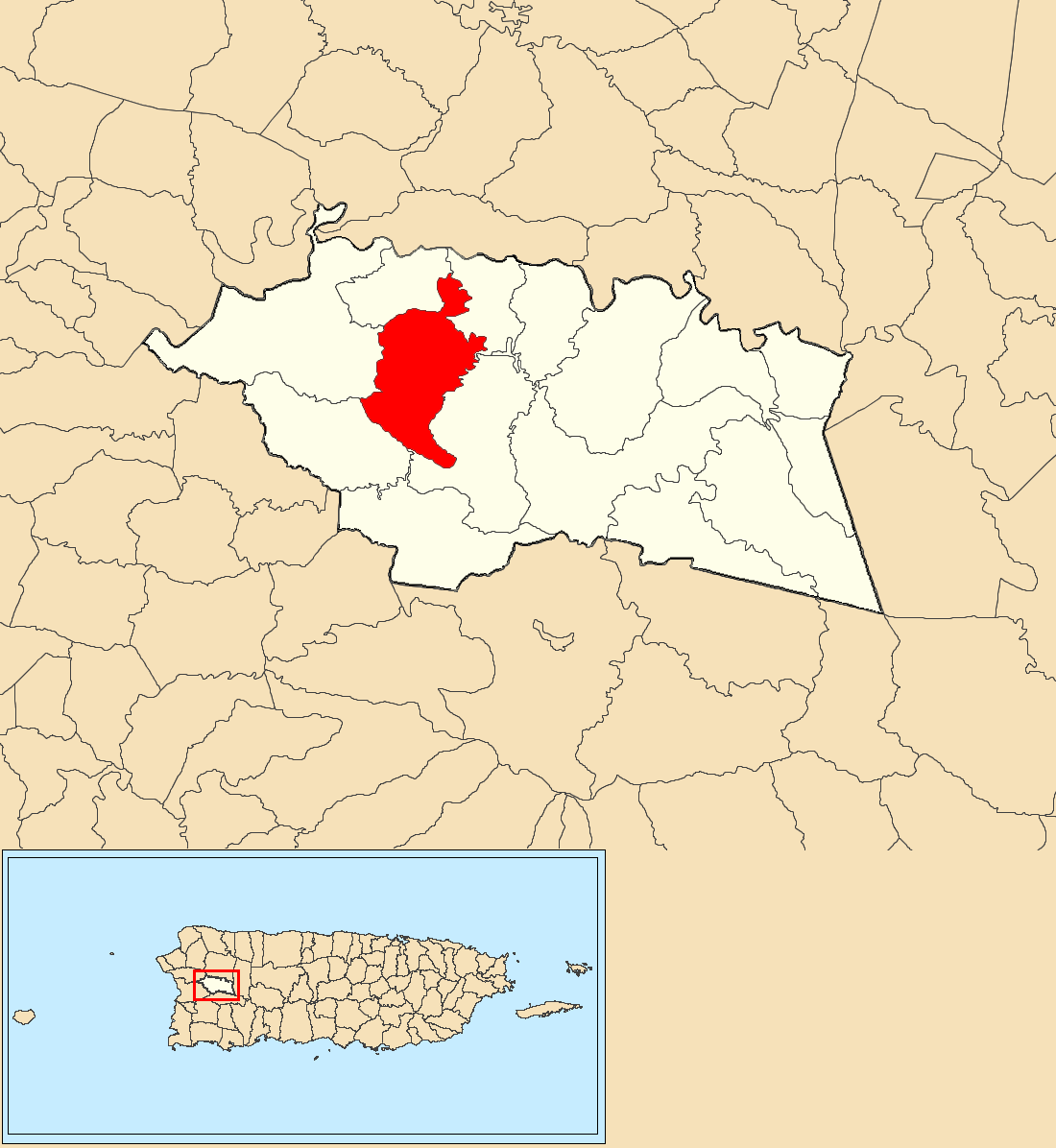
- Location of Furnias within the municipality of Las Marías shown in red

- Location of Puerto Rico
- Coordinates: 18°14′53″N 67°00′45″W
- Commonwealth: Puerto Rico
- Municipality: Las Marías

Area
  - Total: 3.18 sq mi (8.2 km^{2})
  - Land: 3.18 sq mi (8.2 km^{2})
  - Water: 0 sq mi (0 km^{2})
- Elevation: 758 ft (231 m)

Population (2010)
  - Total: 1,474
  - Density: 463.5/sq mi (179.0/km^{2})
- Source: 2010 Census
- Time zone: UTC−4 (AST)

Furnias is a barrio in the municipality of Las Marías, Puerto Rico. Its population in 2010 was 1,474.

== History ==
Furnias was in Spain's gazetteers until Puerto Rico was ceded by Spain in the aftermath of the Spanish–American War under the terms of the Treaty of Paris of 1898 and became an unincorporated territory of the United States. In 1899, the United States Department of War conducted a census of Puerto Rico finding that the combined population of Furnias and Naranjales barrios was 1,255.

Historical population
Census	Pop.	Note	%±
1910	442		—
1920	477		7.9%
1930	488		2.3%
1940	611		25.2%
1950	883		44.5%
1960	673		−23.8%
1970	643		−4.5%
1980	795		23.6%
1990	1,174		47.7%
2000	1,508		28.4%
2010	1,474		−2.3%
U.S. Decennial Census; 1900 (N/A) 1910-1930; 1930-1950 1980-2000 2010

== Sectors ==
Barrios (which are, in contemporary times, roughly comparable to minor civil divisions) in turn are further subdivided into smaller local populated place areas/units called sectores (sectors in English). The types of sectores may vary, from normally sector to urbanización to reparto to barriada to residencial, among others.

The following sectors are in Furnias barrio:

Centro Envejecientes Guajanas, Comunidad Guillermo Martínez, Sector Cosme, Sector La Juanita, Sector La Trapa, Sector Naranjales, and Sector Santa Rosa.

== See also ==
- List of communities in Puerto Rico
- List of barrios and sectors of Las Marías, Puerto Rico
