= Montoso, Mayagüez, Puerto Rico =

Barrio of Puerto Rico

Montoso
- Barrio
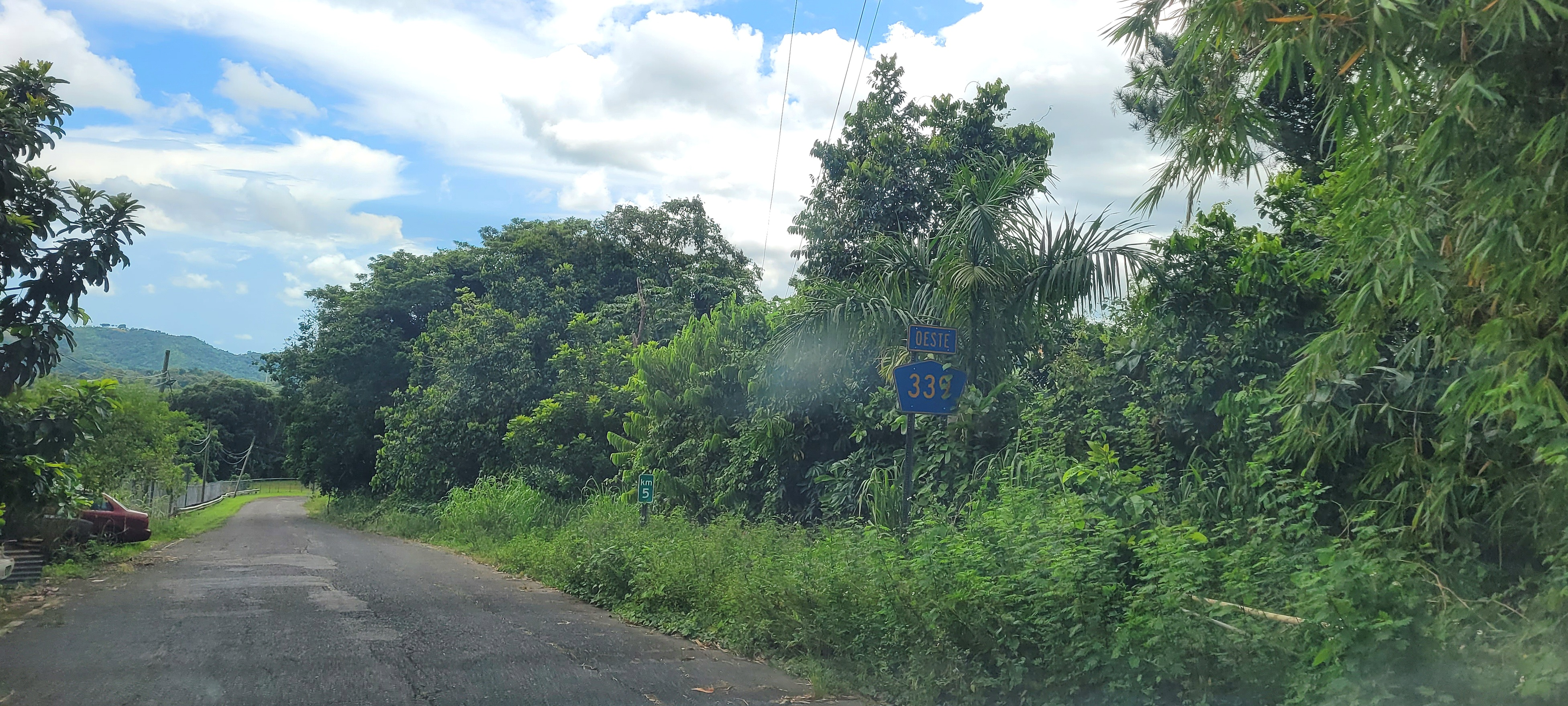
- Puerto Rico Highway 339 in Montoso

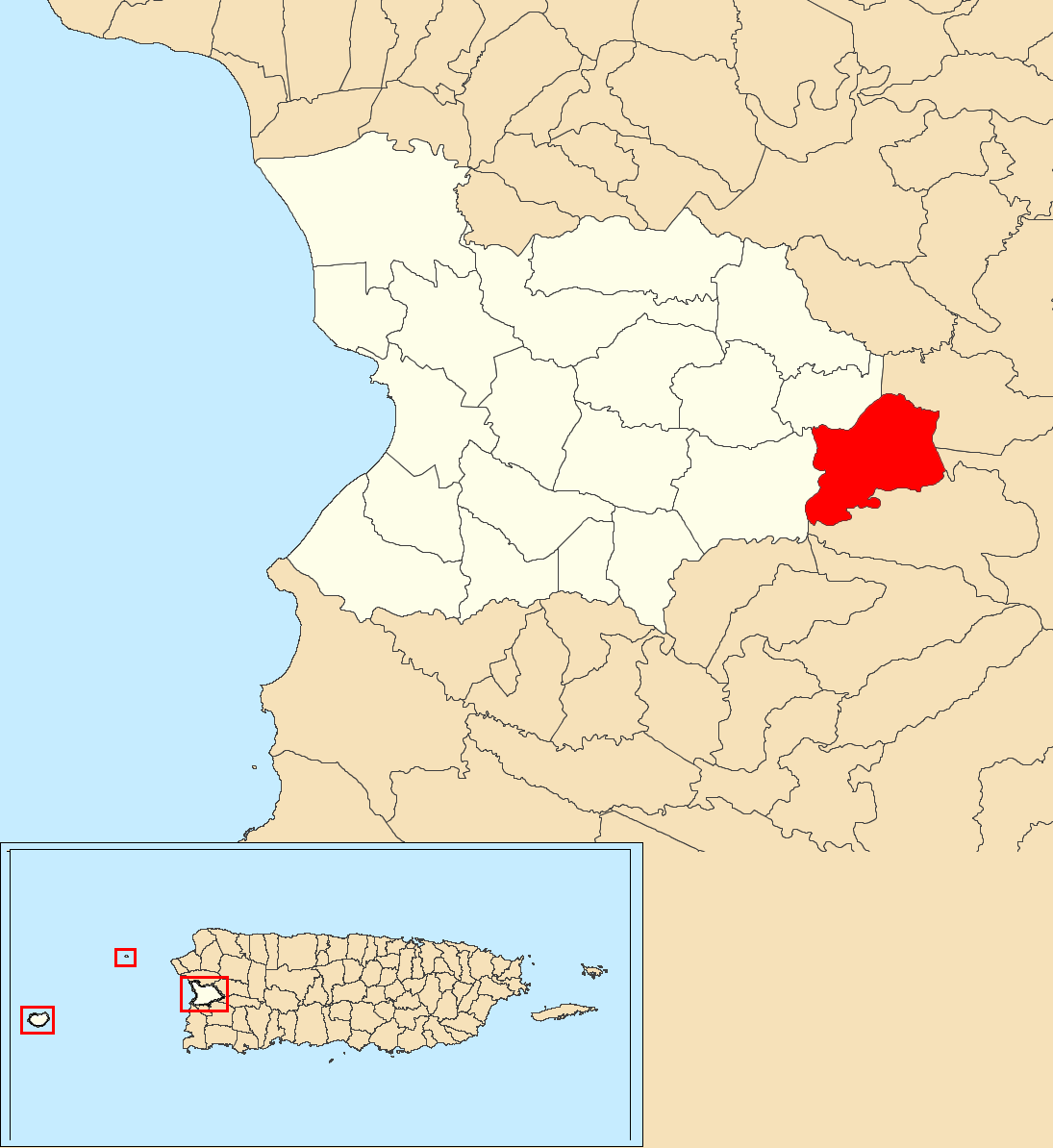
- Location of Montoso within the municipality of Mayagüez shown in red

- Location of Puerto Rico
- Coordinates: 18°11′35″N 67°02′06″W
- Commonwealth: Puerto Rico
- Municipality: Mayagüez

Area
  - Total: 3.08 sq mi (8.0 km^{2})
  - Land: 3.08 sq mi (8.0 km^{2})
  - Water: 0 sq mi (0 km^{2})
- Elevation: 807 ft (246 m)

Population (2010)
  - Total: 1,049
  - Density: 340.6/sq mi (131.5/km^{2})
- Source: 2010 Census
- Time zone: UTC−4 (AST)

Montoso is a barrio in the municipality of Mayagüez, Puerto Rico. Its population in 2010 was 1,049.

== History ==
Montoso was in Spain's gazetteers until Puerto Rico was ceded by Spain in the aftermath of the Spanish–American War under the terms of the Treaty of Paris of 1898 and became an unincorporated territory of the United States. In 1899, the United States Department of War conducted a census of Puerto Rico finding that the population of Montoso barrio was 988.

Historical population
Census	Pop.	Note	%±
1900	988		—
1910	596		−39.7%
1920	671		12.6%
1930	612		−8.8%
1940	852		39.2%
1950	680		−20.2%
1960	427		−37.2%
1970	563		31.9%
1980	808		43.5%
1990	815		0.9%
2000	1,118		37.2%
2010	1,049		−6.2%
U.S. Decennial Census; 1899 (shown as 1900) 1910-1930; 1930-1950 1980-2000 2010

== See also ==
- List of communities in Puerto Rico
