= Bateyes =

Barrio of Mayagüez, Puerto Rico

- Barrio
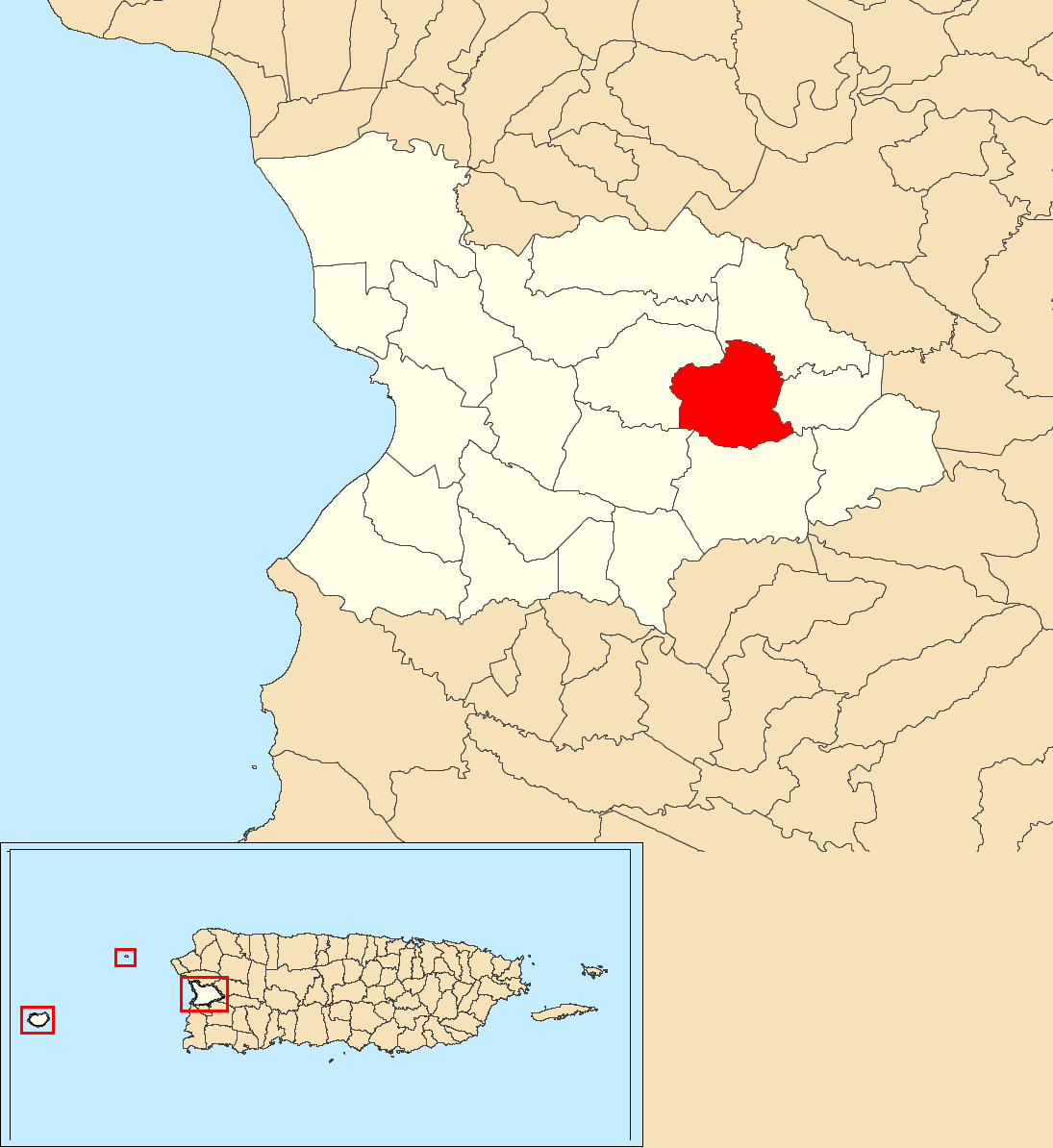
- Location of Bateyes within the municipality of Mayagüez shown in red

- Location of Puerto Rico
- Coordinates: 18°12′29″N 67°04′09″W
- Commonwealth: Puerto Rico
- Municipality: Mayagüez

Area
  - Total: 2.43 sq mi (6.3 km^{2})
  - Land: 2.43 sq mi (6.3 km^{2})
  - Water: 0 sq mi (0 km^{2})
- Elevation: 659 ft (201 m)

Population (2010)
  - Total: 1,156
  - Density: 475.7/sq mi (183.7/km^{2})
- Source: 2010 Census
- Time zone: UTC−4 (AST)

Bateyes is a barrio in the municipality of Mayagüez, Puerto Rico. Its population in 2010 was 1,156.

== History ==
Bateyes was in Spain's gazetteers until Puerto Rico was ceded by Spain in the aftermath of the Spanish–American War under the terms of the Treaty of Paris of 1898 and became an unincorporated territory of the United States. In 1899, the United States Department of War conducted a census of Puerto Rico finding that the population of Bateyes barrio was 1,019.

Historical population
Census	Pop.	Note	%±
1900	1,019		—
1910	666		−34.6%
1920	676		1.5%
1930	475		−29.7%
1940	701		47.6%
1950	798		13.8%
1960	715		−10.4%
1970	811		13.4%
1980	1,027		26.6%
1990	1,088		5.9%
2000	1,205		10.8%
2010	1,156		−4.1%
U.S. Decennial Census; 1899 (shown as 1900) 1910-1930; 1930-1950 1980-2000 2010

== See also ==
- List of communities in Puerto Rico
