= Arenas River (Las Marías, Puerto Rico) =

River of Puerto Rico

Coordinates: 18.2788413°N 67.0068450°W

- Native name: Río Arenas (Spanish)

Location
- Commonwealth: Puerto Rico
- Municipality: Las Marías

Physical characteristics
- Source
  - location: Maravilla Sur, Las Marías
  - elevation: 1421 ft.
- Mouth
  - location: Añasco River in Alto Sano, Las Marías
  - elevation: 240 ft.

The Arenas River (Spanish: Río Arenas) is a tributary of the Añasco River, located in Las Marías, Puerto Rico. The Arenas River has its source in barrio Maravilla Sur of Las Marías, flowing northwardly and passing Las Marías Pueblo before reaching its mouth at the Añasco River at the border of Alto Sano and Maravilla Norte barrios.

== See also ==
- List of rivers of Puerto Rico
