= Naranjales, Las Marías, Puerto Rico =

Barrio of Puerto Rico

Naranjales
- Barrio
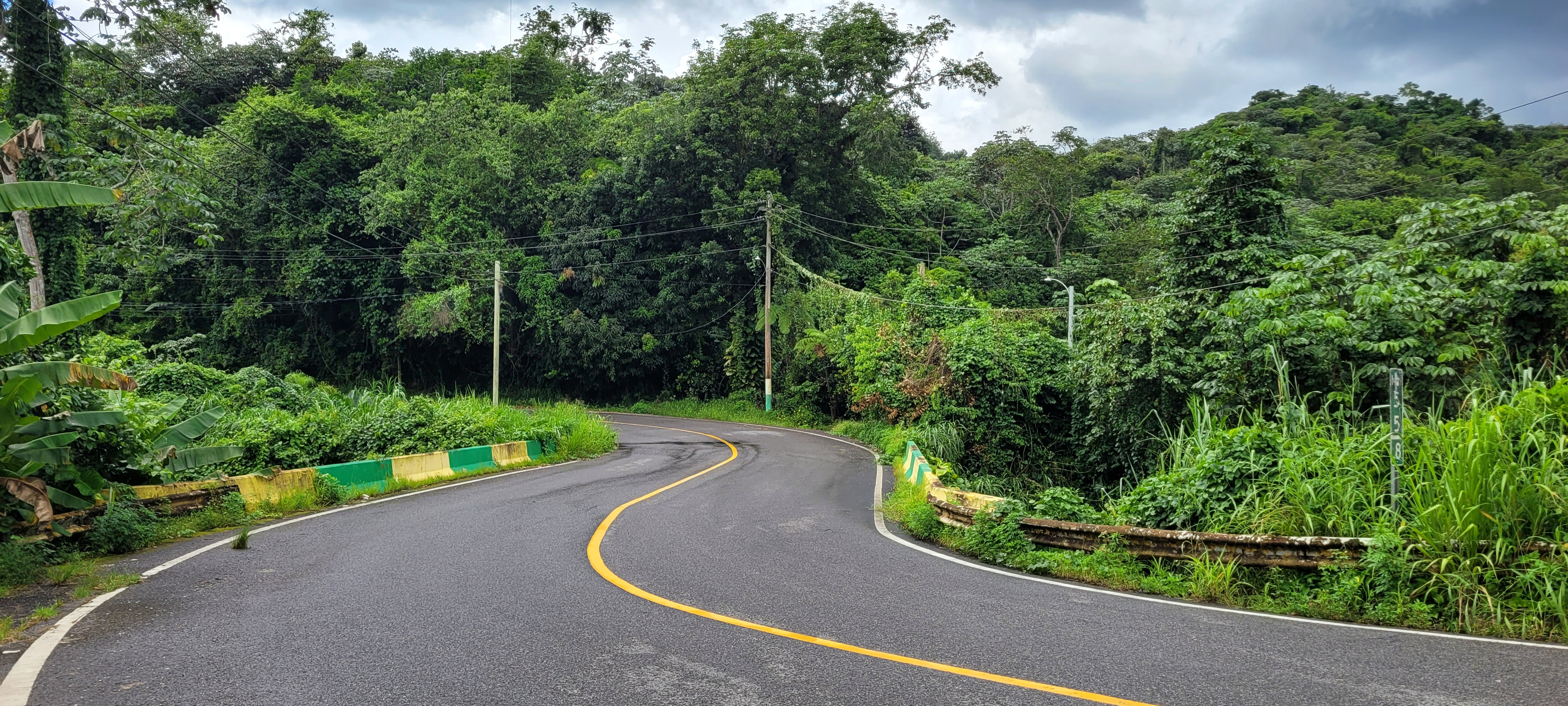
- Puerto Rico Highway 119 between Maravilla Sur, Río Cañas and Naranjales

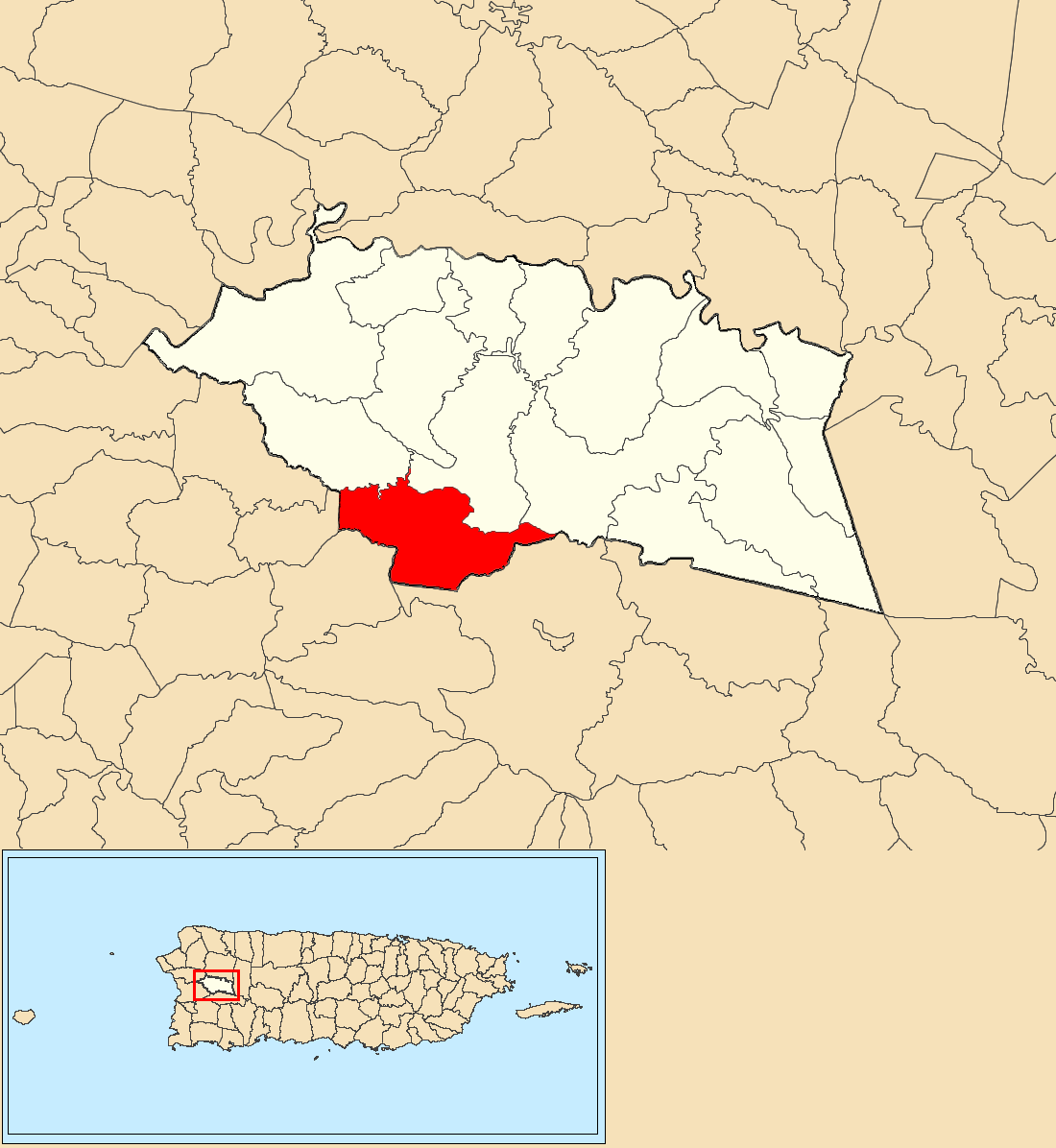
- Location of Naranjales within the municipality of Las Marías shown in red

- Location of Puerto Rico
- Coordinates: 18°12′36″N 67°01′09″W
- Commonwealth: Puerto Rico
- Municipality: Las Marías

Area
  - Total: 3.49 sq mi (9.0 km^{2})
  - Land: 3.49 sq mi (9.0 km^{2})
  - Water: 0 sq mi (0 km^{2})
- Elevation: 1,499 ft (457 m)

Population (2010)
  - Total: 558
  - Density: 159.9/sq mi (61.7/km^{2})
- Source: 2010 Census
- Time zone: UTC−4 (AST)

Naranjales (Naranjales barrio) is a barrio in the municipality of Las Marías, Puerto Rico. Its population in 2010 was 558.

== History ==
Naranjales was in Spain's gazetteers until Puerto Rico was ceded by Spain in the aftermath of the Spanish–American War under the terms of the Treaty of Paris of 1898 and became an unincorporated territory of the United States. In 1899, the United States Department of War conducted a census of Puerto Rico finding that the combined population of Naranjales and Furnias barrios was 1,255.

Historical population
Census	Pop.	Note	%±
1910	568		—
1920	668		17.6%
1930	720		7.8%
1940	667		−7.4%
1950	787		18.0%
1960	611		−22.4%
1970	527		−13.7%
1980	425		−19.4%
1990	352		−17.2%
2000	485		37.8%
2010	558		15.1%
U.S. Decennial Census; 1900 (N/A) 1910-1930; 1930-1950 1980-2000 2010

== Sectors ==
Barrios (which are, in contemporary times, roughly comparable to minor civil divisions) in turn are further subdivided into smaller local populated place areas/units called sectores (sectors in English). The types of sectores may vary, from normally sector to urbanización to reparto to barriada to residencial, among others.

The following sectors are in Naranjales barrio:

Comunidad La Isabel, Parcelas Alto Nieva, Parcelas Plato Indio, Sector Alto Manzano, Sector Alto Nieva, Sector Consumo, Sector Herrería, Sector La Cochera, Sector La Josefa, Sector La Loma de los Vientos, Sector La Trapa, Sector Merle, Sector Retiro, and Tramo Carretera 106.

== See also ==
- List of communities in Puerto Rico
- List of barrios and sectors of Las Marías, Puerto Rico
