= Alto Sano =

Alto Sano may refer to:

== Places ==
- Alto Sano, Las Marías, Puerto Rico, a barrio
- Alto Sano, San Sebastián, Puerto Rico, a barrio
