= Río Arenas =

Río Arenas is the name given to two rivers in Puerto Rico:

- Río Arenas (Las Marias, Puerto Rico)
- Río Arenas (Yabucoa, Puerto Rico)

== See also ==
- Rio Arena or Jeunesse Arena, in Rio de Janeiro, Brazil
- Arenas (disambiguation)
