= Espino, Las Marías, Puerto Rico =

Barrio of Puerto Rico

Espino
- Barrio
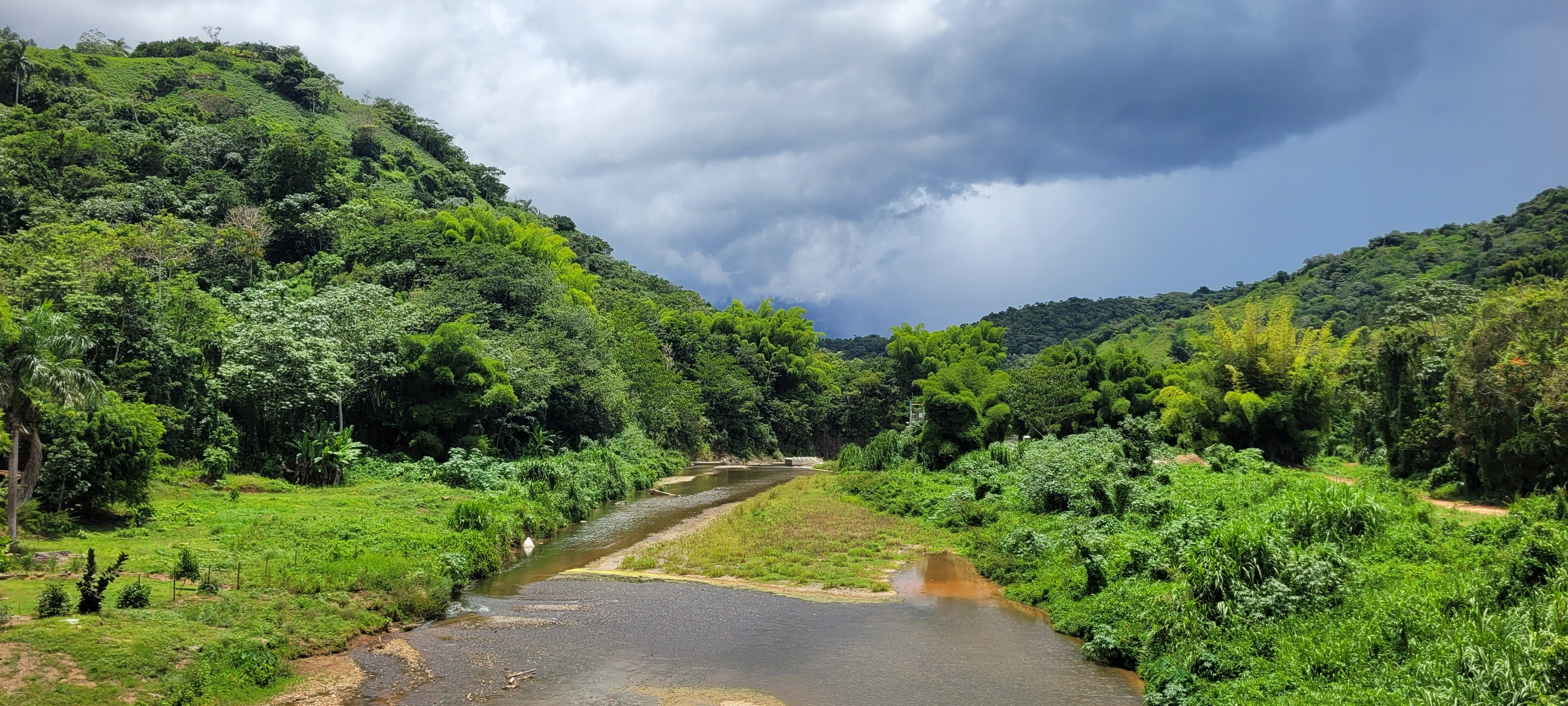
- Río Grande de Añasco between Perchas 2 and Espino

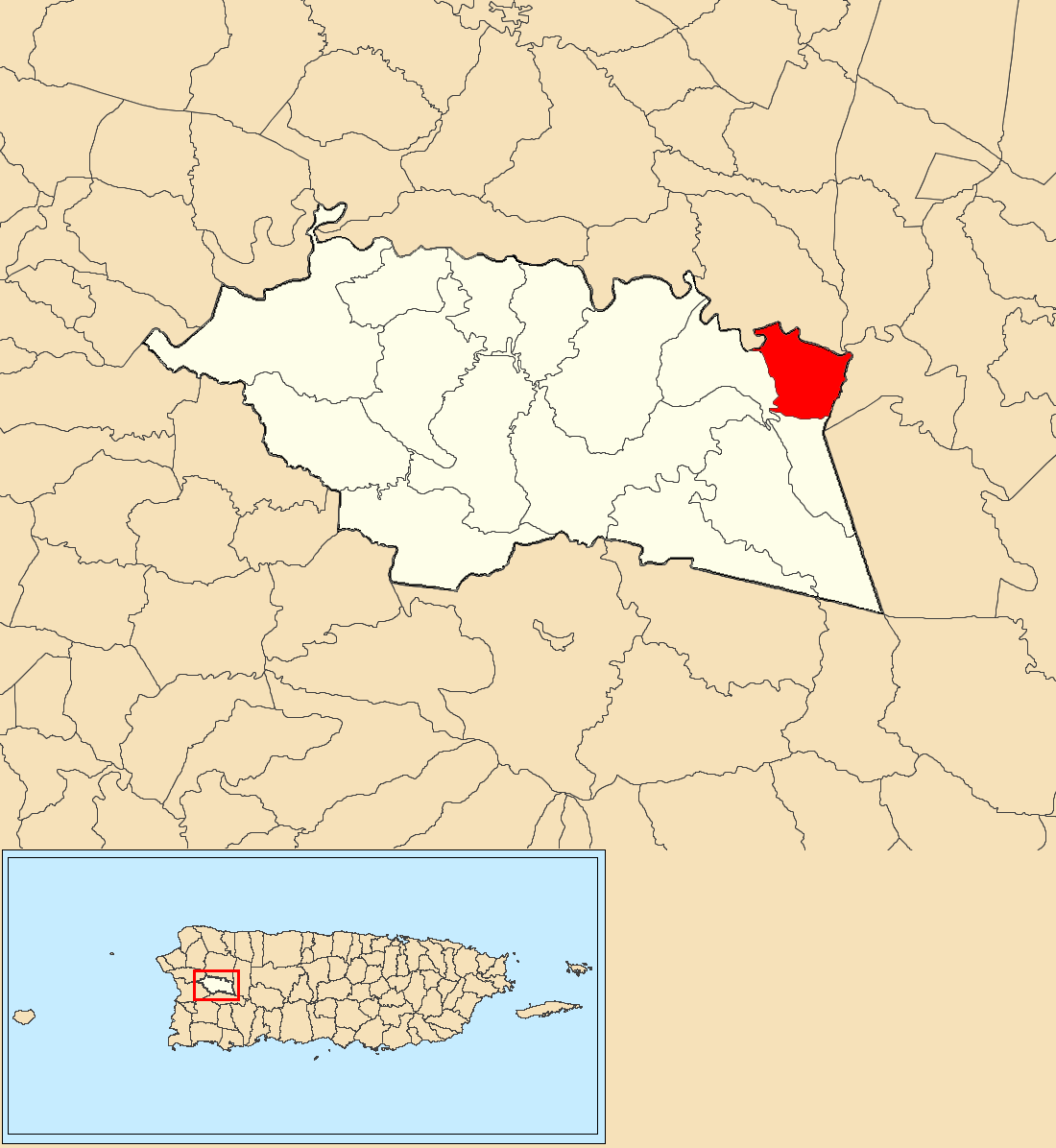
- Location of Espino within the municipality of Las Marías shown in red

- Location of Puerto Rico
- Coordinates: 18°14′54″N 66°54′56″W
- Commonwealth: Puerto Rico
- Municipality: Las Marías

Area
  - Total: 1.62 sq mi (4.2 km^{2})
  - Land: 1.60 sq mi (4.1 km^{2})
  - Water: 0.02 sq mi (0.052 km^{2})
- Elevation: 801 ft (244 m)

Population (2010)
  - Total: 181
  - Density: 113.1/sq mi (43.7/km^{2})
- Source: 2010 Census
- Time zone: UTC−4 (AST)

Espino is a barrio in the municipality of Las Marías, Puerto Rico. Its population in 2010 was 181.

== History ==
Espino was in Spain's gazetteers until Puerto Rico was ceded by Spain in the aftermath of the Spanish–American War under the terms of the Treaty of Paris of 1898 and became an unincorporated territory of the United States. In 1899, the United States Department of War conducted a census of Puerto Rico finding that the combined population of Espino and Chamorro barrios was 986.

Historical population
Census	Pop.	Note	%±
1910	561		—
1920	615		9.6%
1930	524		−14.8%
1940	563		7.4%
1950	441		−21.7%
1960	292		−33.8%
1970	330		13.0%
1980	217		−34.2%
1990	178		−18.0%
2000	183		2.8%
2010	181		−1.1%
U.S. Decennial Census; 1900 (N/A) 1910-1930; 1930-1950 1980-2000 2010

== See also ==
- List of communities in Puerto Rico
- List of barrios and sectors of Las Marías, Puerto Rico
