= Palma Escrita =

Barrio of Las Marías, Puerto Rico

- Barrio
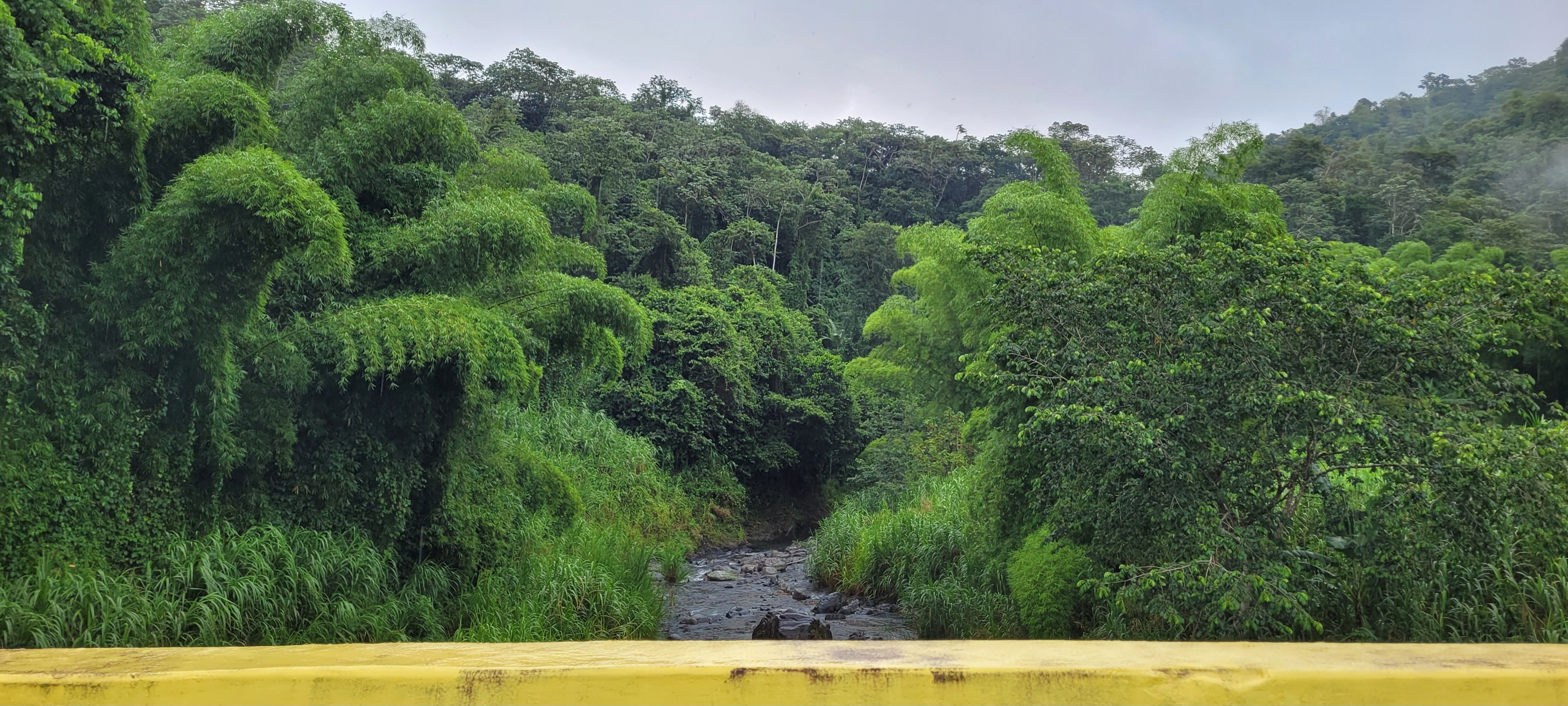
- Guabá River between Palma Escrita and Bucarabones

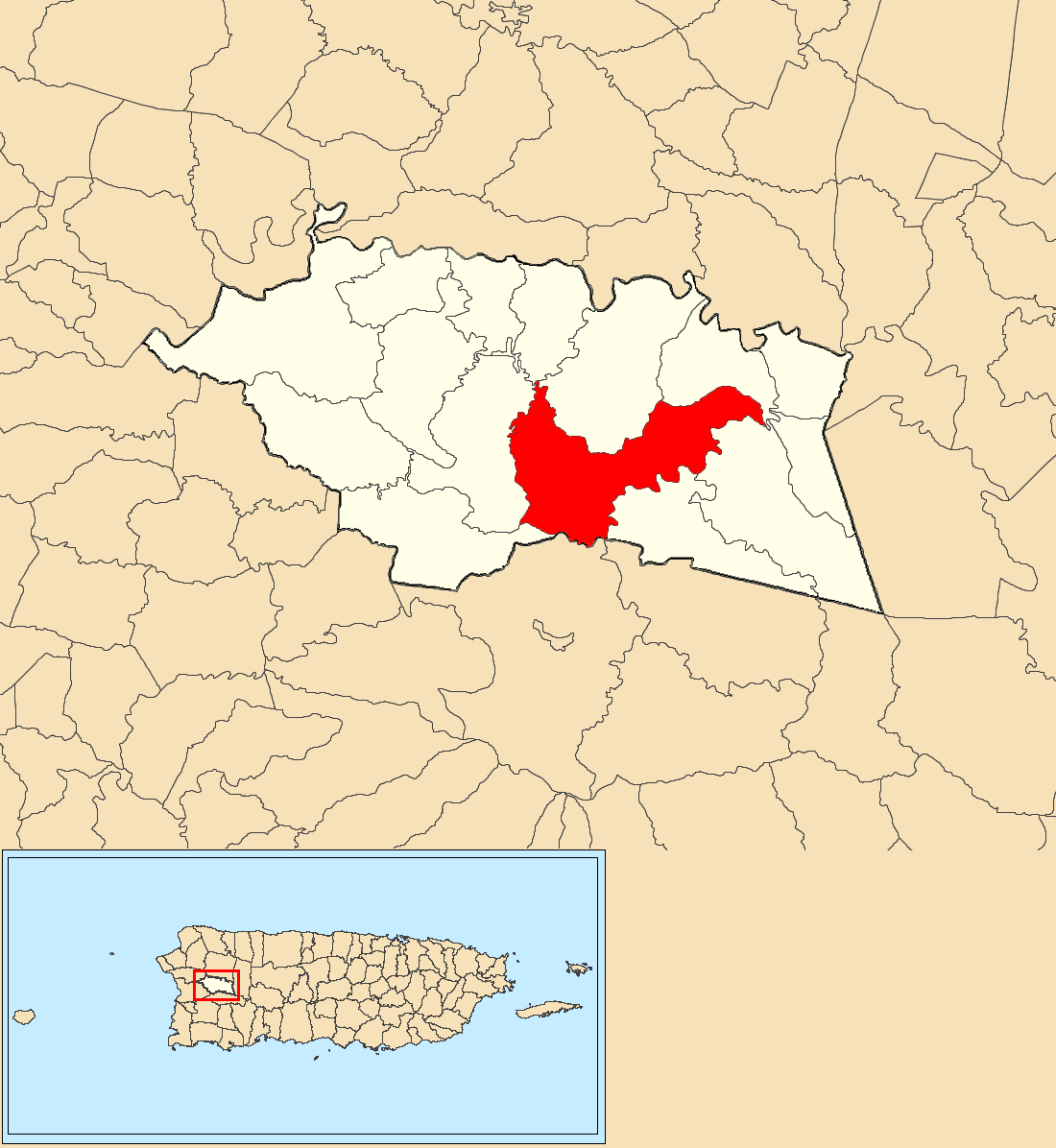
- Location of Palma Escrita within the municipality of Las Marías shown in red

- Location of Puerto Rico
- Coordinates: 18°13′34″N 66°57′55″W
- Commonwealth: Puerto Rico
- Municipality: Las Marías

Area
  - Total: 5.01 sq mi (13.0 km^{2})
  - Land: 5.01 sq mi (13.0 km^{2})
  - Water: 0 sq mi (0 km^{2})
- Elevation: 1,476 ft (450 m)

Population (2010)
  - Total: 507
  - Density: 101.2/sq mi (39.1/km^{2})
- Source: 2010 Census
- Time zone: UTC−4 (AST)

Palma Escrita is a barrio in the municipality of Las Marías, Puerto Rico. Its population in 2010 was 507.

== History ==
Palma Escrita was in Spain's gazetteers until Puerto Rico was ceded by Spain in the aftermath of the Spanish–American War under the terms of the Treaty of Paris of 1898 and became an unincorporated territory of the United States. In 1899, the United States Department of War conducted a census of Puerto Rico finding that the population of Palma Escrita barrio was 1,143.

Historical population
Census	Pop.	Note	%±
1900	1,143		—
1910	930		−18.6%
1920	976		4.9%
1930	723		−25.9%
1940	859		18.8%
1950	1,078		25.5%
1960	1,081		0.3%
1970	788		−27.1%
1980	758		−3.8%
1990	621		−18.1%
2000	693		11.6%
2010	507		−26.8%
U.S. Decennial Census; 1899 (shown as 1900) 1910-1930; 1930-1950 1980-2000 2010

== Sectors ==
Barrios (which are, in contemporary times, roughly comparable to minor civil divisions) in turn are further subdivided into smaller local populated place areas/units called sectores (sectors in English). The types of sectores may vary, from normally sector to urbanización to reparto to barriada to residencial, among others.

The following sectors are in Palma Escrita barrio:

Sector Abanico, Sector Alto Manzano, Sector Mayagüecillo, Sector Palo Prieto, and Sector Zapata.

== See also ==
- List of communities in Puerto Rico
- List of barrios and sectors of Las Marías, Puerto Rico
