= List of barrios and sectors of Las Marías, Puerto Rico =

Like all municipalities of Puerto Rico, Las Marías is subdivided into administrative units called barrios, which are, in contemporary times, roughly comparable to minor civil divisions, (and means wards or boroughs or neighborhoods in English). The barrios and subbarrios, in turn, are further subdivided into smaller local populated place areas/units called sectores (sectors in English). The types of sectores may vary, from normally sector to urbanización to reparto to barriada to residencial, among others. Some sectors appear in two barrios.

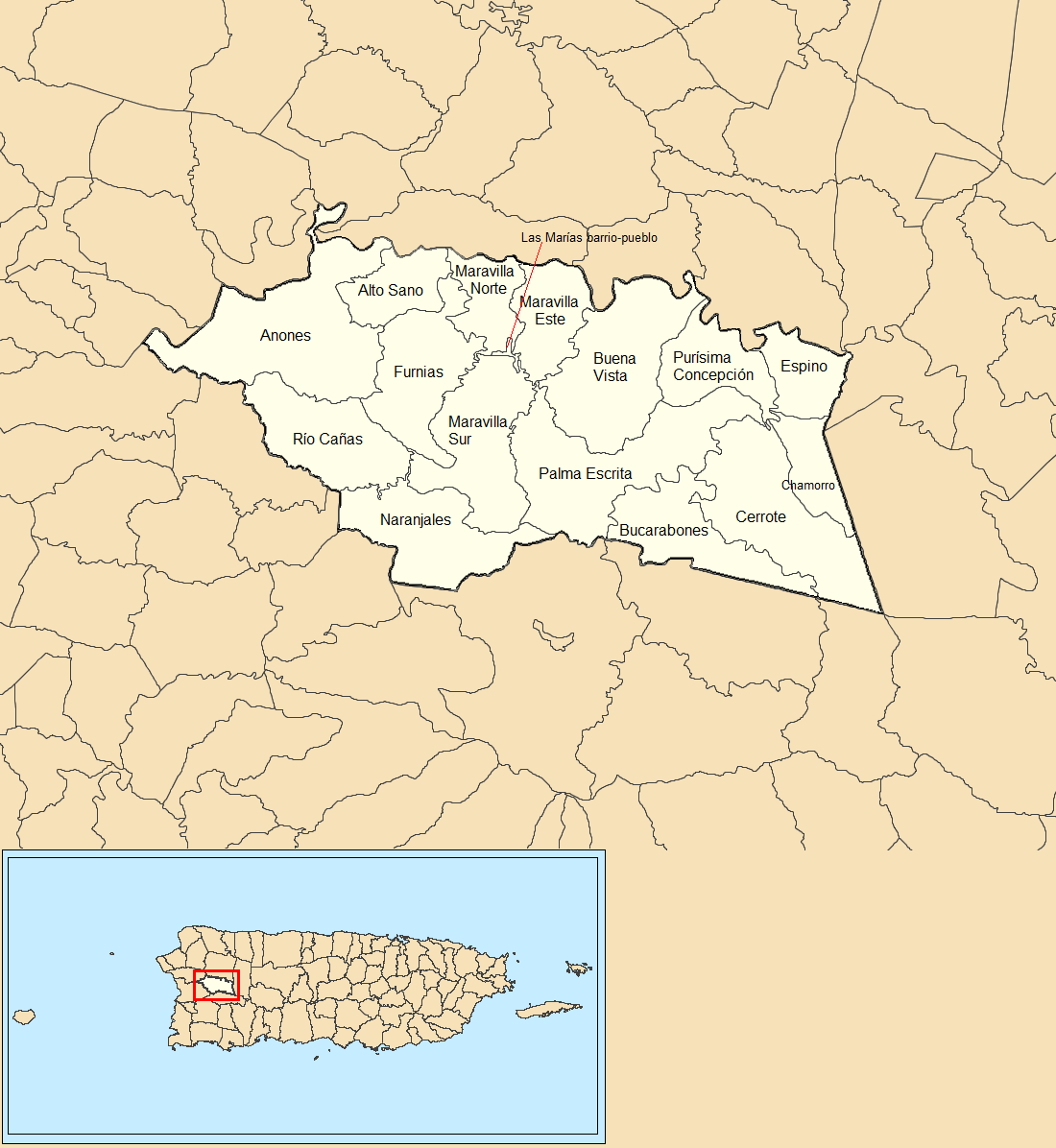
Las Marías map with barrio subdivisions

== List of sectors by barrio ==
=== Alto Sano ===
- Sector Alto Sano Interior

=== Anones ===
- Parcelas Andiarenas
- Parcelas La Mota
- Sector Casey
- Sector Cementerio
- Sector El Tornillo
- Sector Los Vélez
- Sector Pepe Trabal

=== Bucarabones ===
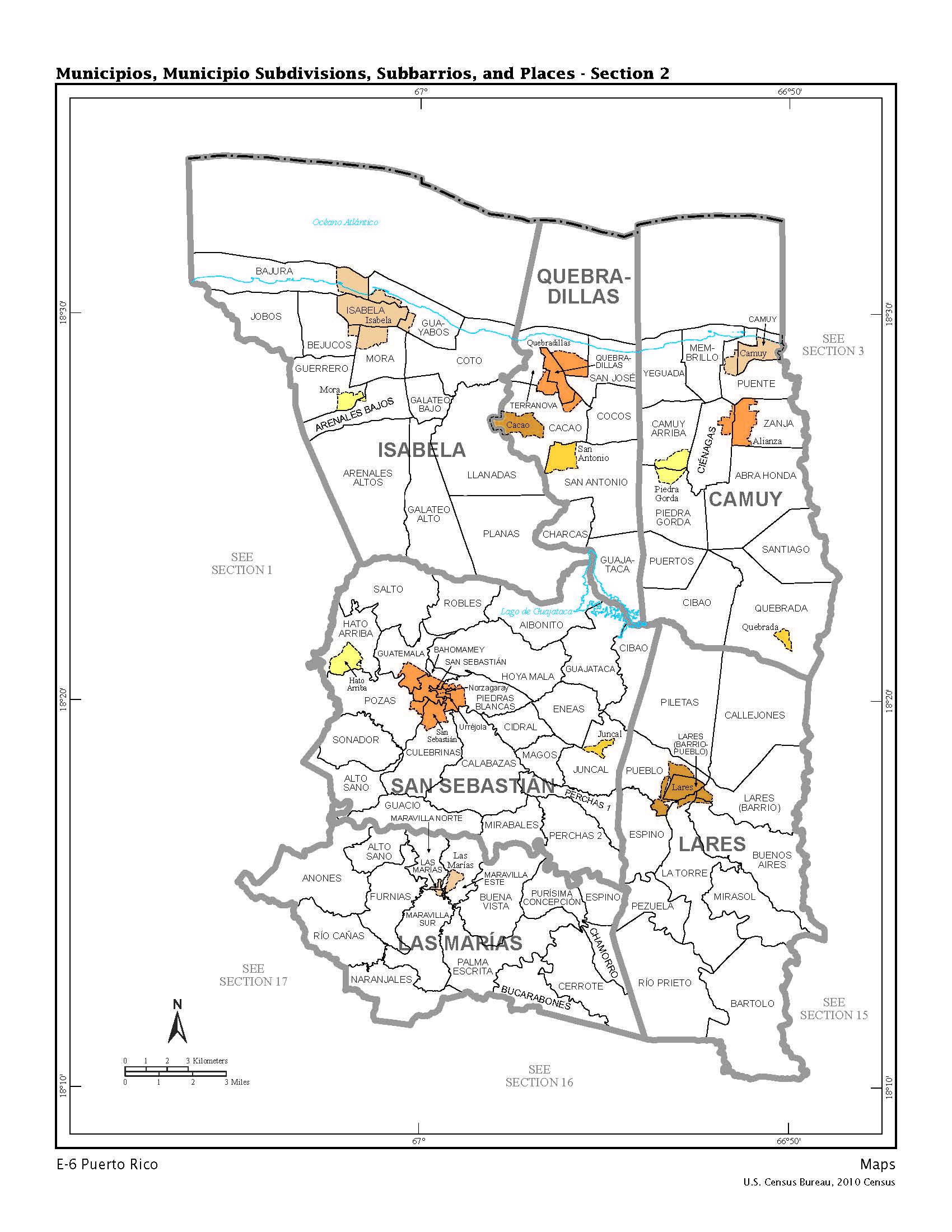
US 2010 census map of Municipios, Municipio Subdivisions, Subbarrios, and Places of Isabela, Quebradillas, Camuy, Lares, Las Marías and San Sebastián

- Sector Guilloty
- Sector La Constancia
- Sector La Josefa
- Sector Magueyes
- Sector Plan Bonito

=== Buena Vista ===
- Parcelas Juan González
- Sector El Guasio
- Sector El Recreo
- Sector Frontera
- Sector La Perrera
- Sector Los Adventistas
- Sector Los Jorge
- Sector Los Millonarios
- Sector Los Verdes
- Sector Palo Prieto
- Sector Relámpago

=== Cerrote ===
- Sector Bryan
- Sector Casanova
- Sector Guaba
- Sector Justiniano
- Sector Laguna
- Sector Miraflores

=== Chamorro ===
- Parcelas Enseñat
- Parcelas Esmoris
- Sector La Constancia
- Sector Pedro Acevedo
- Sector Vargas

=== Espino ===
There are no sectors in Espino barrio.

=== Furnias ===
- Centro Envejecientes Guajanas
- Comunidad Guillermo Martínez
- Sector Cosme
- Sector La Juanita
- Sector La Trapa
- Sector Naranjales
- Sector Santa Rosa

=== Las Marías barrio-pueblo ===
- Calle Palmer
- Calle San Benito
- Urbanización Lavergne
- Urbanización Serrano

=== Maravilla Este ===
- Avenida Adrián Acevedo
- Calle Barbosa y Bernard
- Calle Rafael Quiles
- Comunidad Muñoz Torruellas
- Parcelas Acevedo
- Sector Agustín Torres
- Sector El Guasio
- Sector La Calzada
- Sector La Gallera
- Sector La Vega del Combate
- Sector Méndez

=== Maravilla Norte ===
- Calle Augusto Cruz
- Calle Matías Brughman
- Parcelas Lavergne
- Parcelas Santaliz
- Reparto Santaliz
- Sector El Llano
- Sector Río Arenas
- Urbanización Estancias Santaliz

=== Maravilla Sur ===
- Residencial Jardines
- Río Arenas Apartments
- Sector La Candelaria
- Sector La Milagrosa
- Sector La Trapa
- Sector Mayagüecillo
- Urbanización Colinas de María
- Urbanización El Bosque
- Urbanización El Coquí
- Urbanización Inmaculado Corazón de María

=== Naranjales ===
- Comunidad La Isabel
- Parcelas Alto Nieva
- Parcelas Plato Indio
- Sector Alto Manzano
- Sector Alto Nieva
- Sector Consumo
- Sector Herrería
- Sector La Cochera
- Sector La Josefa
- Sector La Loma de los Vientos
- Sector La Trapa
- Sector Merle
- Sector Retiro
- Tramo Carretera 106

=== Palma Escrita ===
- Sector Abanico
- Sector Alto Manzano
- Sector Mayagüecillo
- Sector Palo Prieto
- Sector Zapata

=== Purísima Concepción ===
- Camino Durán
- Camino El Porvenir
- Camino Las Vélez
- Carretera La Pura
- Hacienda Bauzá
- Sector Francisco Ramos
- Sector La Teresa
- Sector Los Millonarios
- Sector Luisa Mercado
- Sector Miguel Acevedo

=== Río Cañas ===
- Parcelas El Triunfo
- Parcelas La Trapa
- Parcelas Plato Indio
- Sector Los Martínez
- Sector Merle

== See also ==
- List of communities in Puerto Rico
