= Anones, Las Marías, Puerto Rico =

Barrio of Puerto Rico

Anones
- Barrio
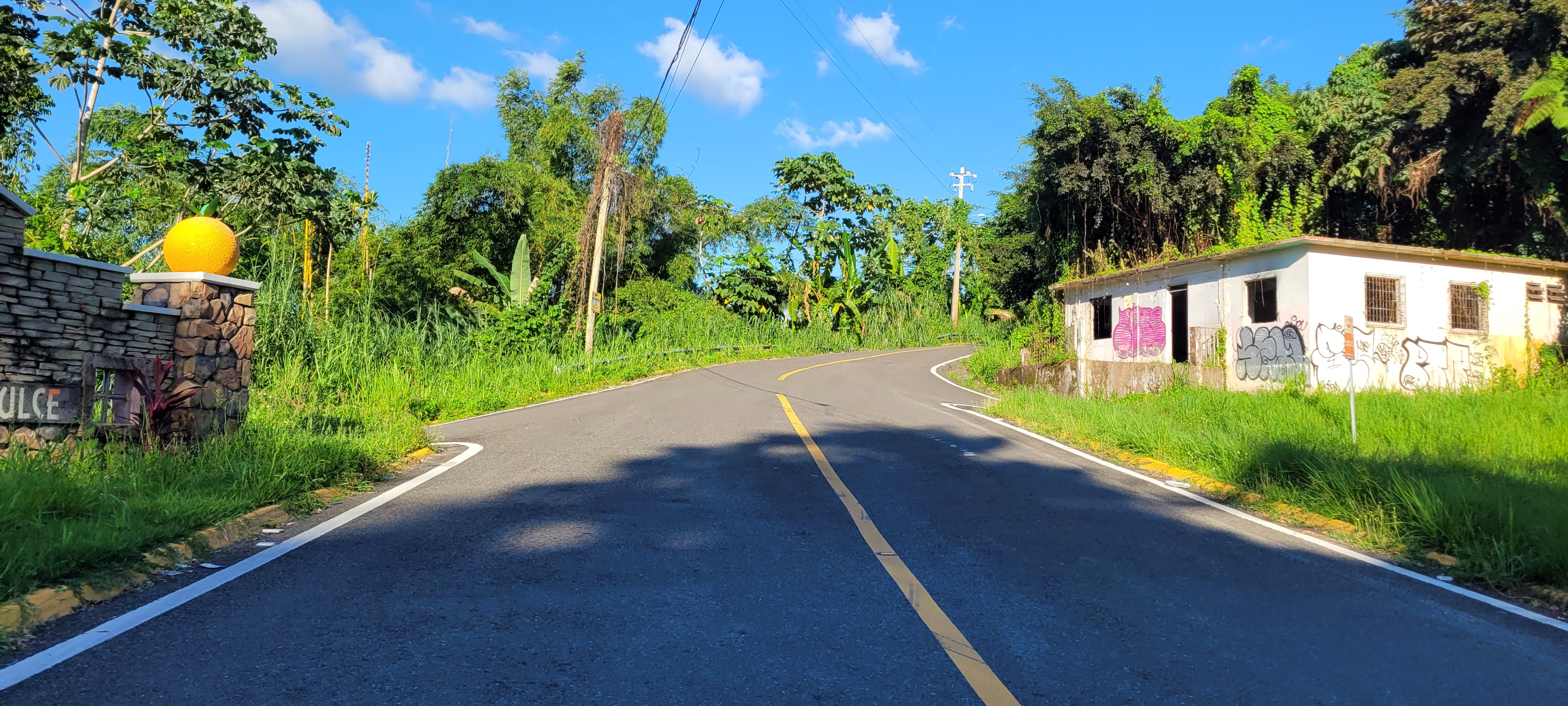
- Puerto Rico Highway 4406 in Anones

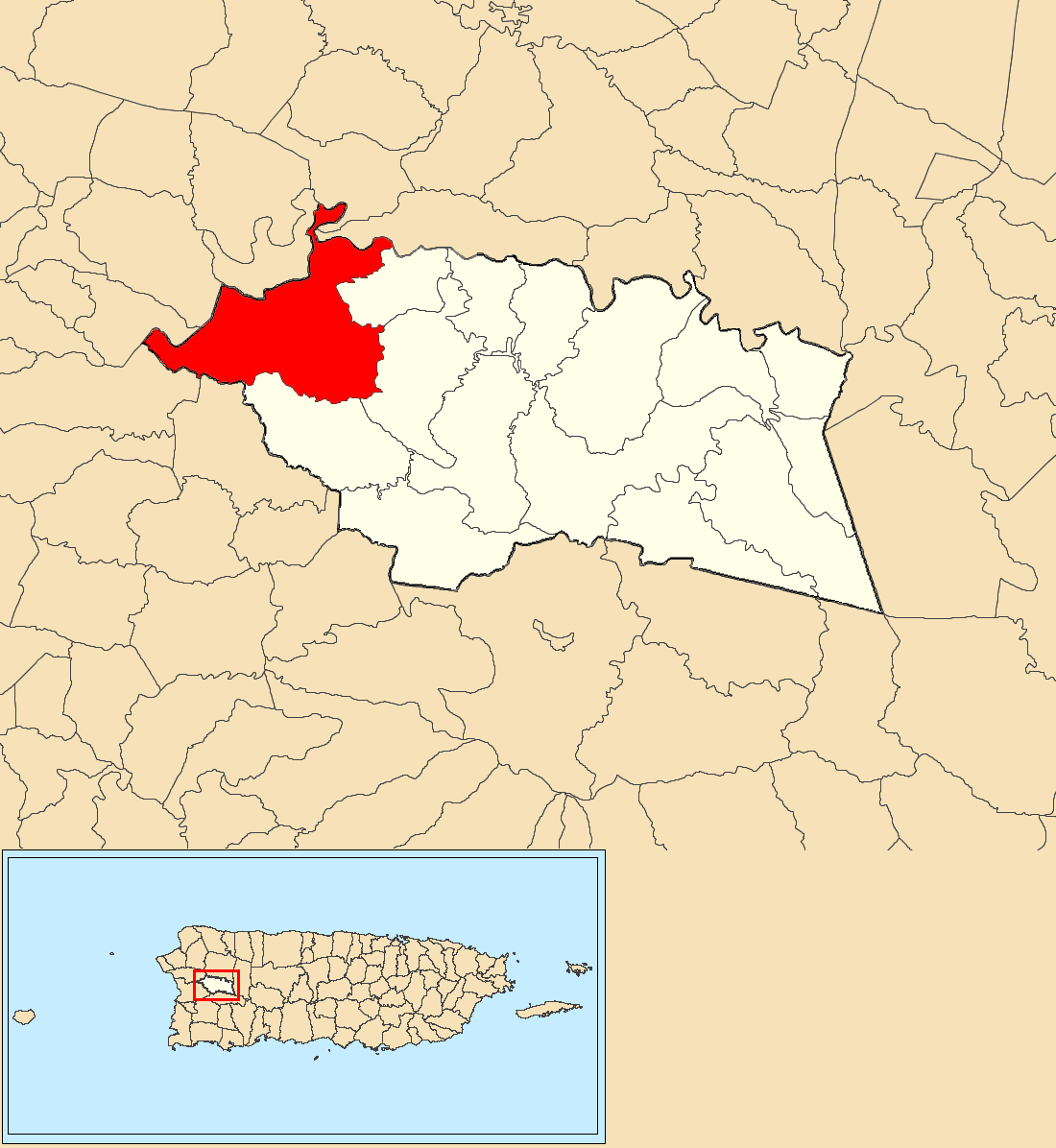
- Location of Anones within the municipality of Las Marías shown in red

- Location of Puerto Rico
- Coordinates: 18°15′56″N 67°02′43″W
- Commonwealth: Puerto Rico
- Municipality: Las Marías

Area
  - Total: 5.98 sq mi (15.5 km^{2})
  - Land: 5.95 sq mi (15.4 km^{2})
  - Water: 0.03 sq mi (0.078 km^{2})
- Elevation: 991 ft (302 m)

Population (2010)
  - Total: 1,262
  - Density: 212.1/sq mi (81.9/km^{2})
- Source: 2010 Census
- Time zone: UTC−4 (AST)

Anones is a barrio in the municipality of Las Marías, Puerto Rico. Its population in 2010 was 1,262.

== History ==
Anones was in Spain's gazetteers until Puerto Rico was ceded by Spain in the aftermath of the Spanish–American War under the terms of the Treaty of Paris of 1898 and became an unincorporated territory of the United States. In 1899, the United States Department of War conducted a census of Puerto Rico finding that the population of Anones barrio was 1,251.

Historical population
| Census | Pop. | Note | %± |
|---|---|---|---|
| 1900 | 1,251 | | — |
| 1910 | 1,074 | | −14.1% |
| 1920 | 1,057 | | −1.6% |
| 1930 | 787 | | −25.5% |
| 1940 | 919 | | 16.8% |
| 1950 | 1,098 | | 19.5% |
| 1960 | 986 | | −10.2% |
| 1970 | 892 | | −9.5% |
| 1980 | 1,079 | | 21.0% |
| 1990 | 1,102 | | 2.1% |
| 2000 | 1,443 | | 30.9% |
| 2010 | 1,262 | | −12.5% |
U.S. Decennial Census; 1899 (shown as 1900) 1910-1930; 1930-1950 1980-2000 2010

== Sectors ==
Barrios (which are, in contemporary times, roughly comparable to minor civil divisions) in turn are further subdivided into smaller local populated place areas/units called sectores (sectors in English). The types of sectores may vary, from normally sector to urbanización to reparto to barriada to residencial, among others.

The following sectors are in Anones barrio:

Parcelas Andiarenas, Parcelas La Mota, Sector Casey, Sector Cementerio, Sector El Tornillo, Sector Los Vélez, and Sector Pepe Trabal.

== See also ==
- List of communities in Puerto Rico
- List of barrios and sectors of Las Marías, Puerto Rico
