= Buena Vista, Las Marías, Puerto Rico =

Barrio of Puerto Rico

Buena Vista
- Barrio
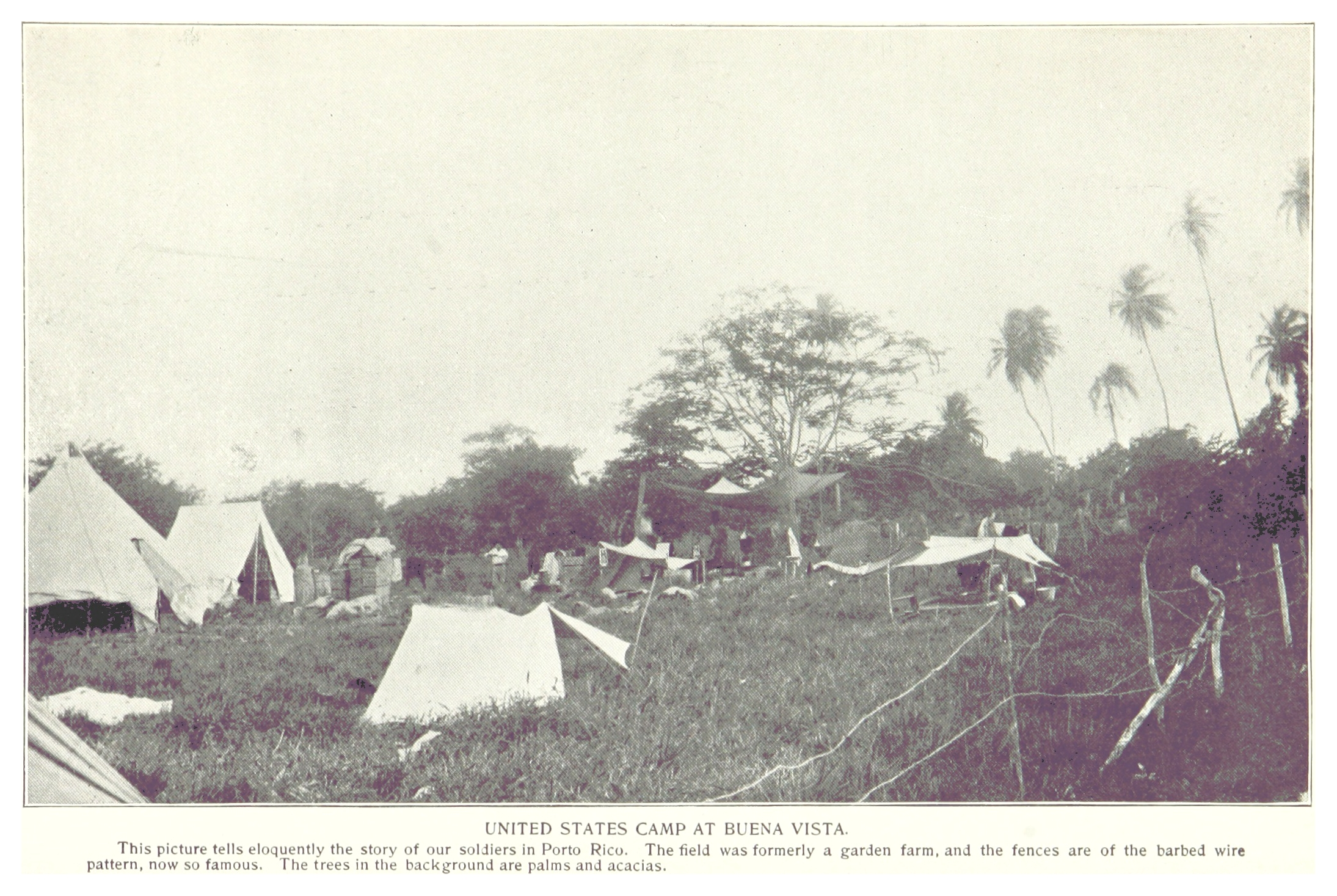
- An American camp in Buena Vista during the Spanish-American War

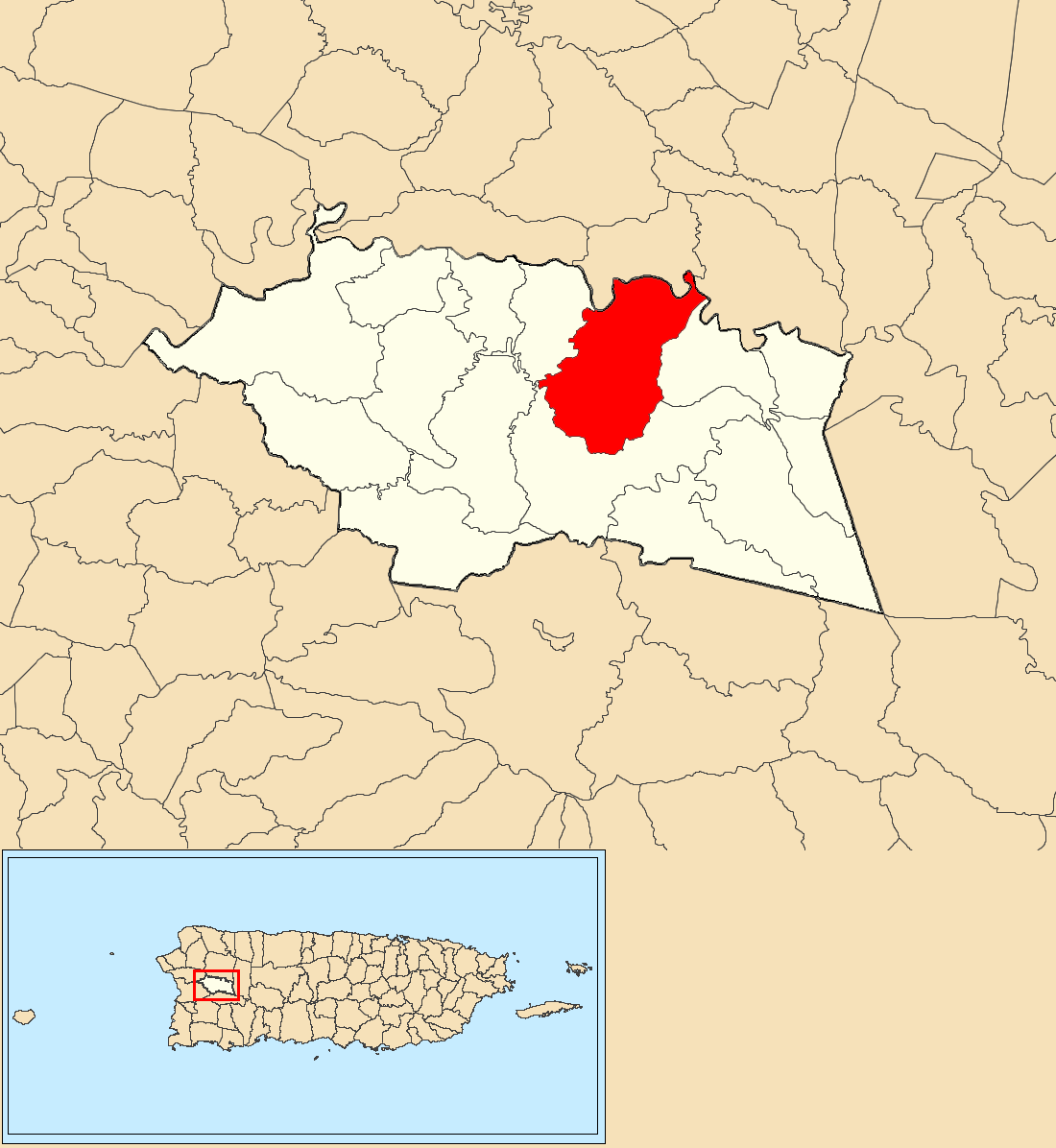
- Location of Buena Vista within the municipality of Las Marías shown in red

- Location of Puerto Rico
- Coordinates: 18°15′03″N 66°57′44″W
- Commonwealth: Puerto Rico
- Municipality: Las Marías

Area
  - Total: 4.45 sq mi (11.5 km^{2})
  - Land: 4.41 sq mi (11.4 km^{2})
  - Water: 0.04 sq mi (0.10 km^{2})
- Elevation: 1,037 ft (316 m)

Population (2010)
  - Total: 615
  - Density: 139.8/sq mi (54.0/km^{2})
- Source: 2010 Census
- Time zone: UTC−4 (AST)

Buena Vista is a barrio in the municipality of Las Marías, Puerto Rico. Its population in 2010 was 615.

== History ==
Buena Vista was in Spain's gazetteers until Puerto Rico was ceded by Spain in the aftermath of the Spanish–American War under the terms of the Treaty of Paris of 1898 and became an unincorporated territory of the United States. In 1899, the United States Department of War conducted a census of Puerto Rico finding that the population of Buena Vista barrio was 1,120.

Historical population
Census	Pop.	Note	%±
1900	1,120		—
1910	977		−12.8%
1920	984		0.7%
1930	791		−19.6%
1940	817		3.3%
1950	884		8.2%
1960	806		−8.8%
1970	579		−28.2%
1980	642		10.9%
1990	672		4.7%
2000	715		6.4%
2010	615		−14.0%
U.S. Decennial Census; 1899 (shown as 1900) 1910-1930; 1930-1950 1980-2000 2010

== Sectors ==
Barrios (which are, in contemporary times, roughly comparable to minor civil divisions) in turn are further subdivided into smaller local populated place areas/units called sectores (sectors in English). The types of sectores may vary, from normally sector to urbanización to reparto to barriada to residencial, among others.

The following sectors are in Buena Vista barrio:

Parcelas Juan González, Sector El Guasio, Sector El Recreo, Sector Frontera, Sector La Perrera, Sector Los Adventistas, Sector Los Jorge, Sector Los Millonarios, Sector Los Verdes, Sector Palo Prieto, and Sector Relámpago.

== See also ==
- List of communities in Puerto Rico
- List of barrios and sectors of Las Marías, Puerto Rico
