= Maravilla Este =

Barrio of Las Marías, Puerto Rico

- Barrio
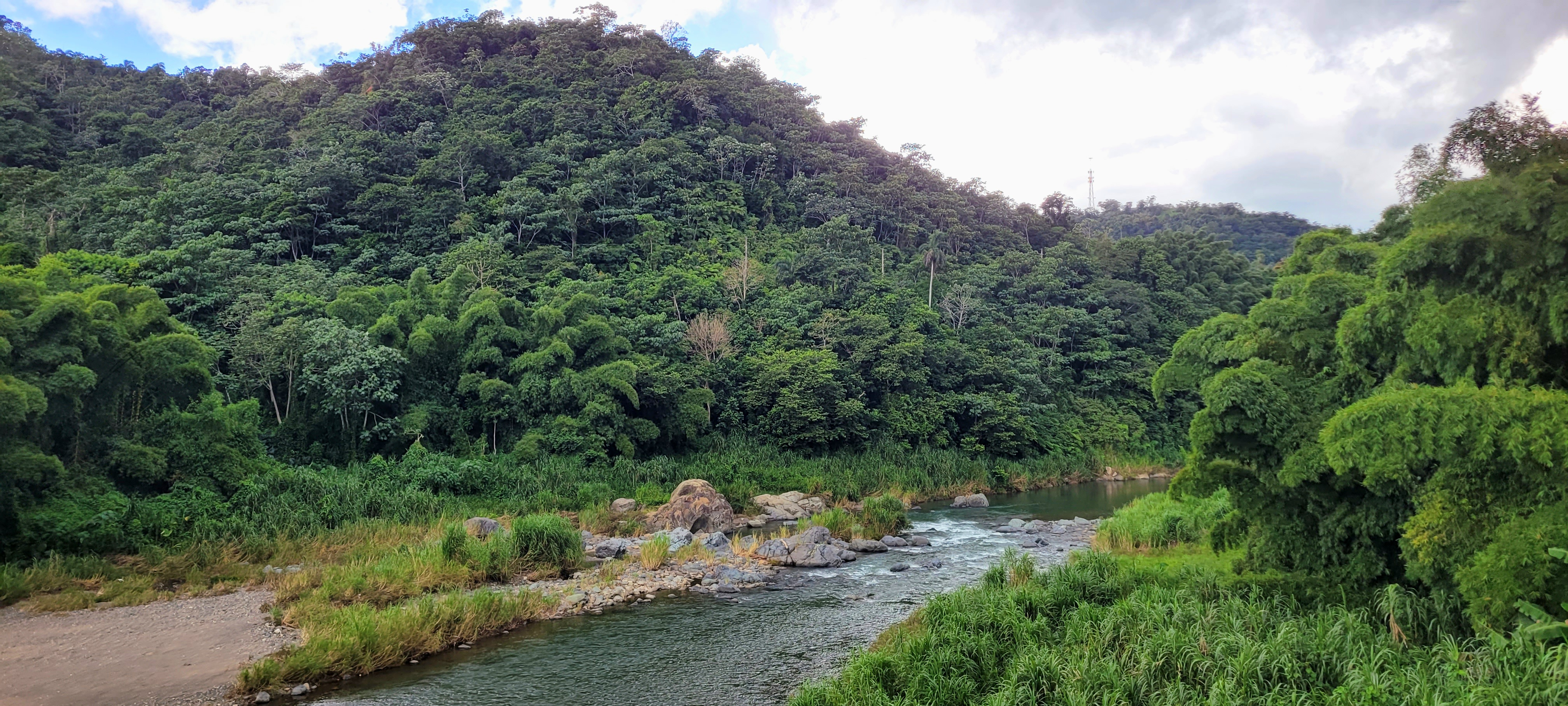
- Río Grande de Añasco between Guacio and Maravilla Este

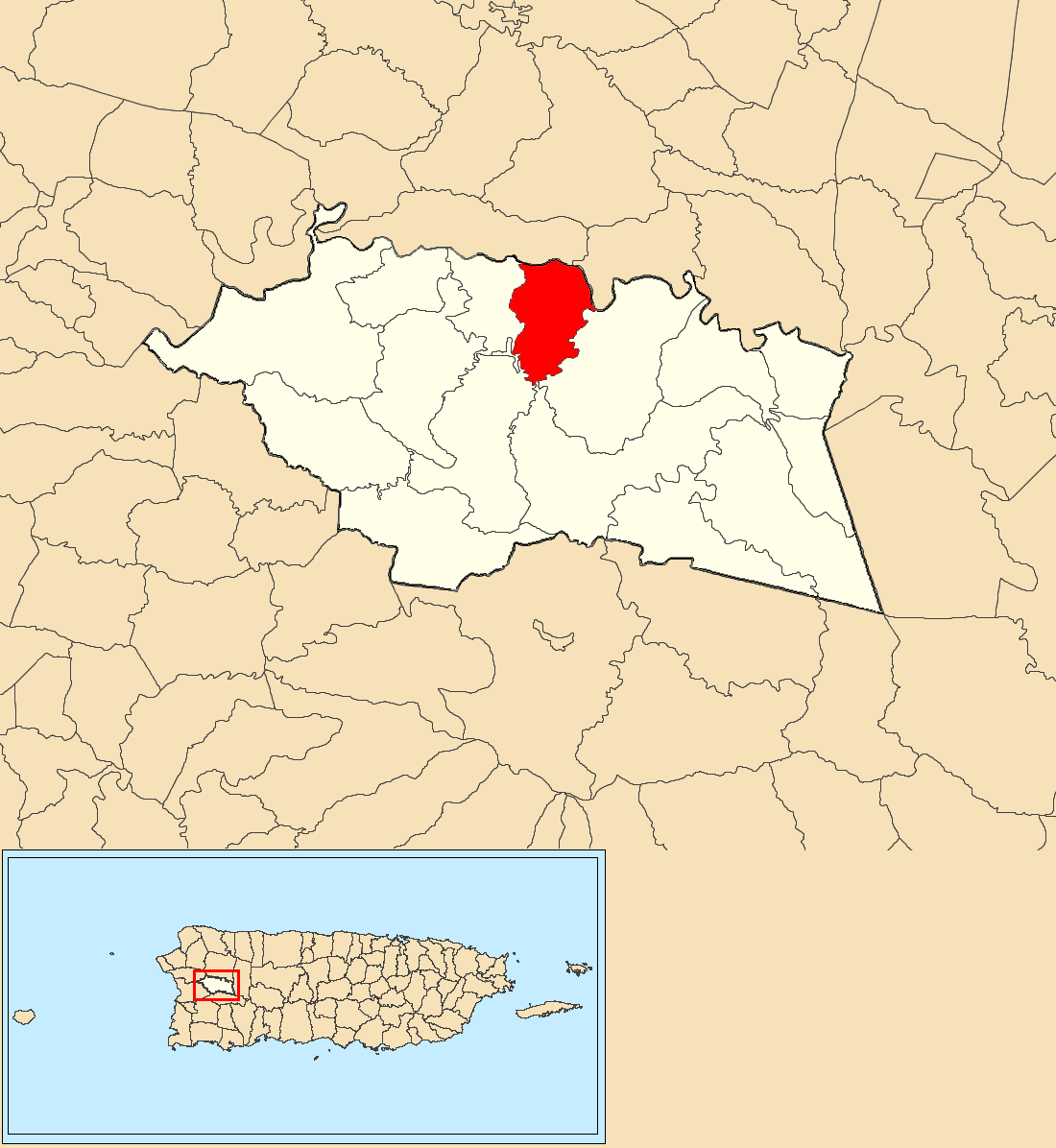
- Location of Maravilla Este within the municipality of Las Marías shown in red

- Location of Puerto Rico
- Coordinates: 18°15′45″N 66°58′50″W
- Commonwealth: Puerto Rico
- Municipality: Las Marías

Area
  - Total: 1.94 sq mi (5.0 km^{2})
  - Land: 1.93 sq mi (5.0 km^{2})
  - Water: 0.01 sq mi (0.026 km^{2})
- Elevation: 755 ft (230 m)

Population (2010)
  - Total: 748
  - Density: 387.6/sq mi (149.7/km^{2})
- Source: 2010 Census
- Time zone: UTC−4 (AST)

Maravilla Este is a barrio in the municipality of Las Marías, Puerto Rico. Its population in 2010 was 748.

== History ==
The area was in Spain's gazetteers until Puerto Rico was ceded by Spain in the aftermath of the Spanish–American War under the terms of the Treaty of Paris of 1898 and became an unincorporated territory of the United States. In 1899, the United States Department of War conducted a census of Puerto Rico finding that the combined population of Maravilla and Las Marías Pueblo barrios was 1,235. At the time, the census takers didn't distinguish between the current three separate Maravilla barrios (Maravilla Este, Maravilla Norte and Maravilla Sur).

Historical population
Census	Pop.	Note	%±
1940	562		—
1950	862		53.4%
1960	709		−17.7%
1970	687		−3.1%
1980	824		19.9%
1990	674		−18.2%
2000	944		40.1%
2010	748		−20.8%
U.S. Decennial Census; 1900 (N/A) 1910-1930; 1930-1950 1980-2000 2010

== Sectors ==
Barrios (which are, in contemporary times, roughly comparable to minor civil divisions) in turn are further subdivided into smaller local populated place areas/units called sectores (sectors in English). The types of sectores may vary, from normally sector to urbanización to reparto to barriada to residencial, among others.

The following sectors are in Maravilla Este barrio:

Avenida Adrián Acevedo, Calle Barbosa y Bernard, Calle Rafael Quiles, Comunidad Muñoz Torruellas, Parcelas Acevedo, Sector Agustín Torres, Sector El Guasio, Sector La Calzada, Sector La Gallera, Sector La Vega del Combate, and Sector Méndez.

== See also ==
- List of communities in Puerto Rico
- List of barrios and sectors of Las Marías, Puerto Rico
