= Purísima Concepción, Las Marías, Puerto Rico =

Barrio of Puerto Rico

Purísima Concepción
- Barrio
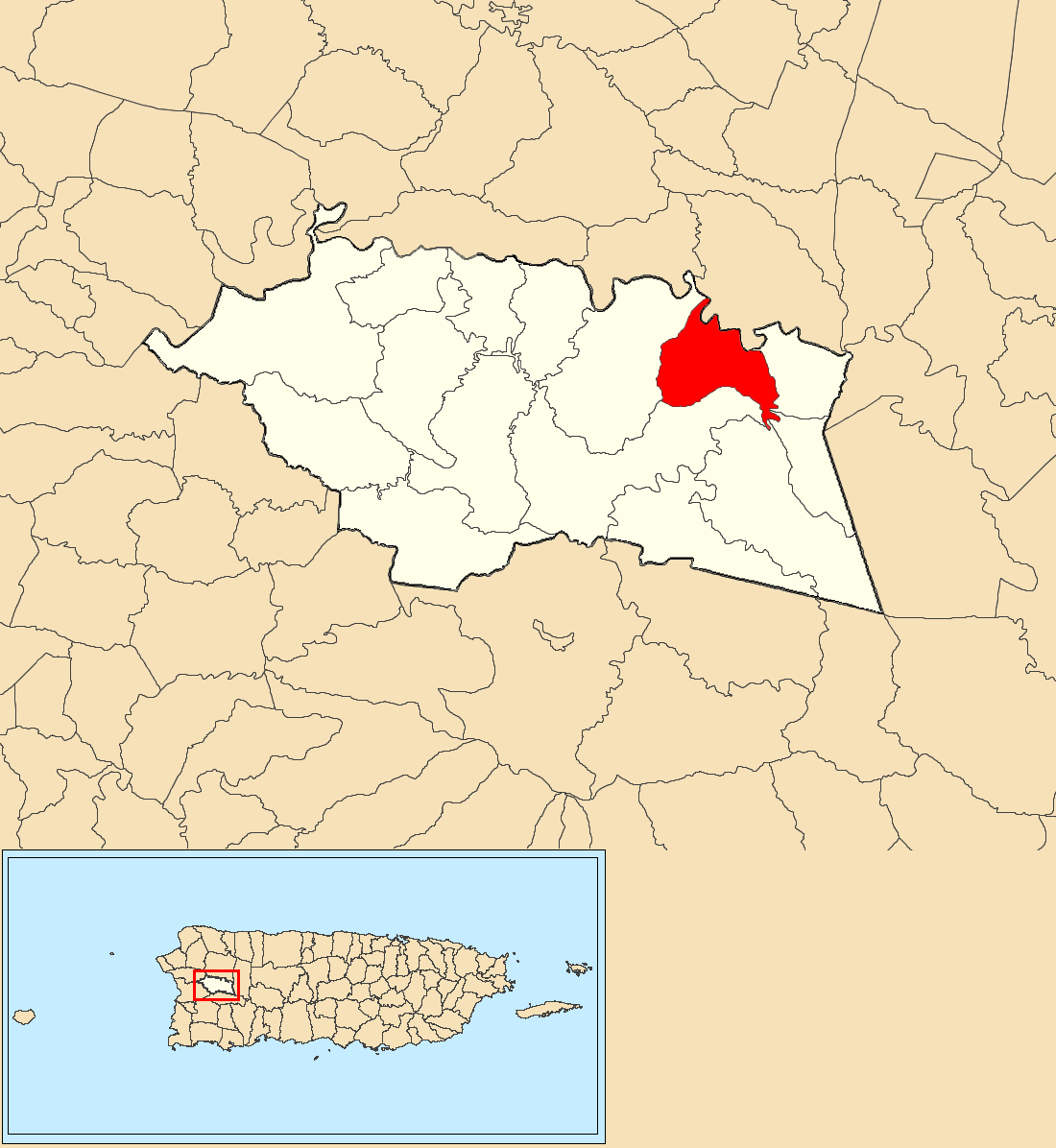
- Location of Purísima Concepción within the municipality of Las Marías shown in red

- Location of Puerto Rico
- Coordinates: 18°14′42″N 66°56′41″W
- Commonwealth: Puerto Rico
- Municipality: Las Marías

Area
  - Total: 2.13 sq mi (5.5 km^{2})
  - Land: 2.10 sq mi (5.4 km^{2})
  - Water: 0.03 sq mi (0.078 km^{2})
- Elevation: 1,014 ft (309 m)

Population (2010)
  - Total: 87
  - Density: 41.4/sq mi (16.0/km^{2})
- Source: 2010 Census
- Time zone: UTC−4 (AST)

Purísima Concepción is a barrio in the municipality of Las Marías, Puerto Rico. Its population in 2010 was 87.

== History ==
Purísima Concepción was in Spain's gazetteers until Puerto Rico was ceded by Spain in the aftermath of the Spanish–American War under the terms of the Treaty of Paris of 1898 and became an unincorporated territory of the United States. In 1899, the United States Department of War conducted a census of Puerto Rico finding that the population of Purísima Concepción barrio was 1,007.

Historical population
Census	Pop.	Note	%±
1900	1,007		—
1910	665		−34.0%
1920	544		−18.2%
1930	437		−19.7%
1940	435		−0.5%
1950	512		17.7%
1960	392		−23.4%
1970	248		−36.7%
1980	137		−44.8%
1990	185		35.0%
2000	144		−22.2%
2010	87		−39.6%
U.S. Decennial Census; 1899 (shown as 1900) 1910-1930; 1930-1950 1980-2000 2010

== Sectors ==
Barrios (which are, in contemporary times, roughly comparable to minor civil divisions) in turn are further subdivided into smaller local populated place areas/units called sectores (sectors in English). The types of sectores may vary, from normally sector to urbanización to reparto to barriada to residencial, among others.

The following sectors are in Purísima Concepción barrio:

Camino Durán, Camino El Porvenir, Camino Las Vélez, Carretera La Pura, Hacienda Bauzá, Sector Francisco Ramos, Sector La Teresa, Sector Los Millonarios, Sector Luisa Mercado, and Sector Miguel Acevedo.

== See also ==
- List of communities in Puerto Rico
- List of barrios and sectors of Las Marías, Puerto Rico
