= Las Marías barrio-pueblo =

Historical and administrative center (seat) of Las Marías, Puerto Rico

Las Marías barrio-pueblo Pueblo de Las Marías
- Municipality Seat
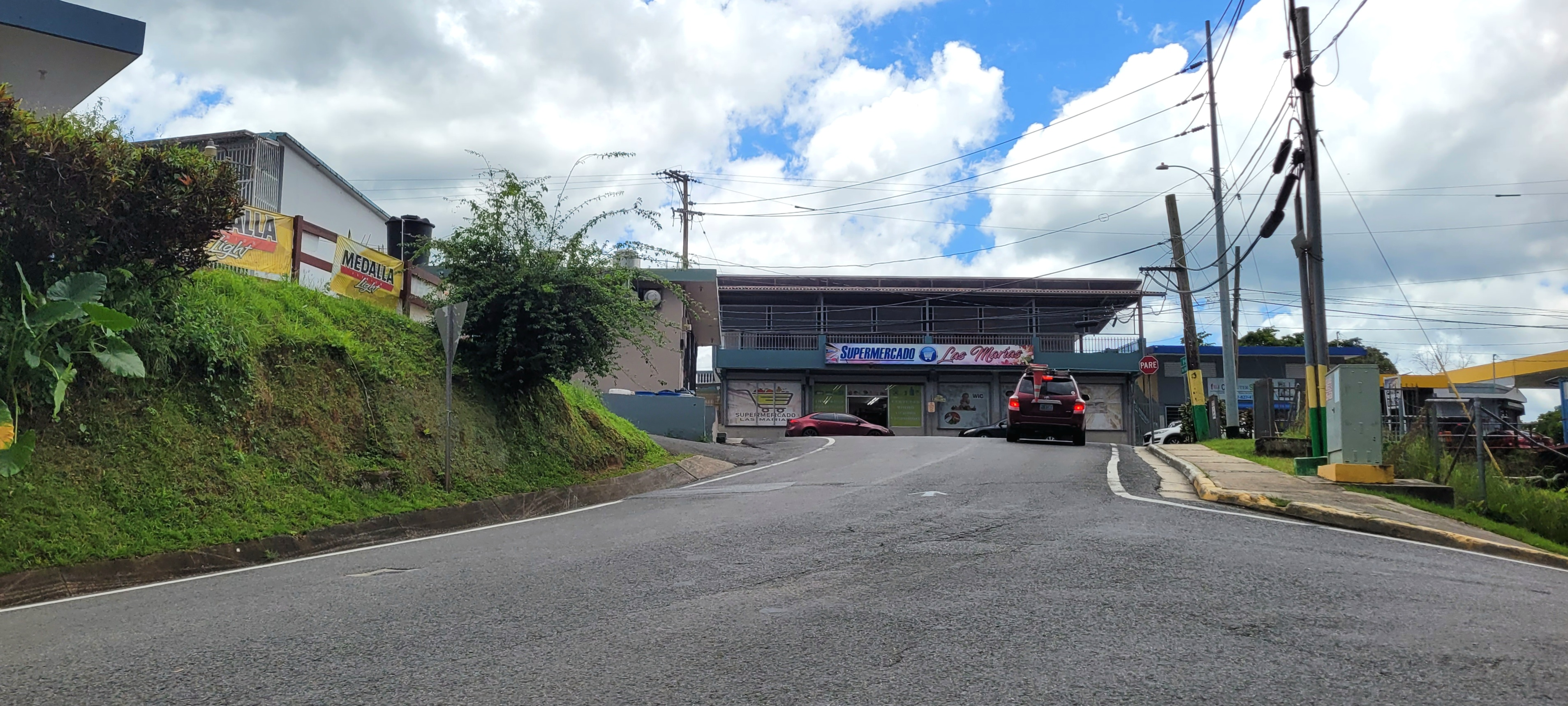
- Puerto Rico Highway 119 entering downtown Las Marías

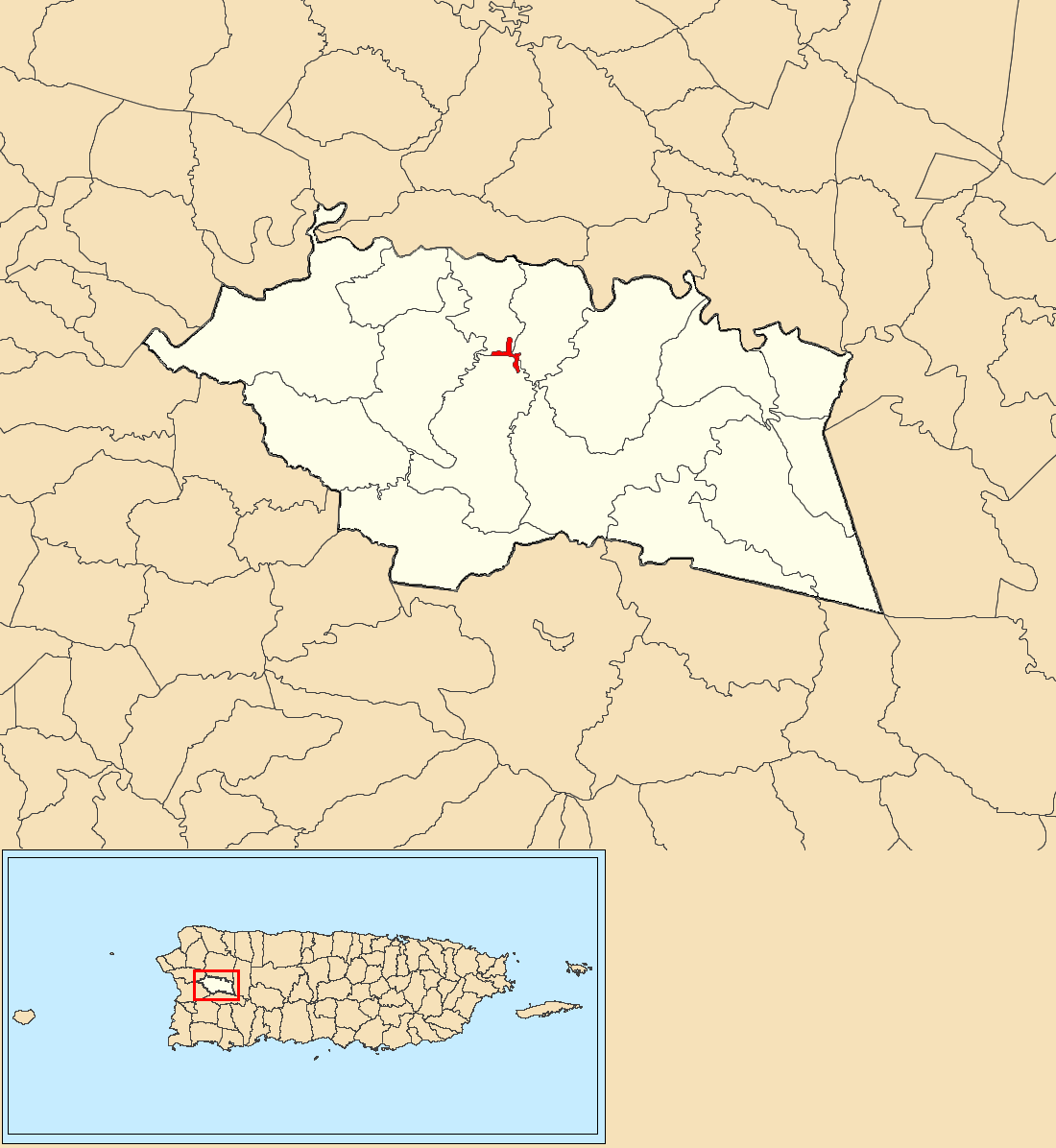
- Location of Las Marías barrio-pueblo within the municipality of Las Marías shown in red

- Location of Puerto Rico
- Coordinates: 18°15′08″N 66°59′27″W
- Commonwealth: Puerto Rico
- Municipality: Las Marías

Area
  - Total: 0.06 sq mi (0.16 km^{2})
  - Land: 0.06 sq mi (0.16 km^{2})
  - Water: 0 sq mi (0 km^{2})
- Elevation: 1,014 ft (309 m)

Population (2010)
  - Total: 262
  - Density: 4,366.7/sq mi (1,686.0/km^{2})
- Source: 2010 Census
- Time zone: UTC−4 (AST)

Las Marías barrio-pueblo is a barrio and the administrative center (seat) of Las Marías, a municipality of Puerto Rico. Its population in 2010 was 262.

As was customary in Spain, in Puerto Rico, the municipality has a barrio called pueblo which contains a central plaza, the municipal buildings (city hall), and a Catholic church. Fiestas patronales (patron saint festivals) are held in the central plaza every year.

== The central plaza and its church ==
The central plaza, or square, is a place for official and unofficial recreational events and a place where people can gather and socialize from dusk to dawn. The Laws of the Indies, Spanish law, which regulated life in Puerto Rico in the early 19th century, stated the plaza's purpose was for "the parties" (celebrations, festivities) (Spanish: a propósito para las fiestas), and that the square should be proportionally large enough for the number of neighbors (Spanish: grandeza proporcionada al número de vecinos). These Spanish regulations also stated that the streets nearby should be comfortable portals for passersby, protecting them from the elements: sun and rain.

Located across the central plaza in Las Marías barrio-pueblo is the Parroquia Inmaculado Corazón de María, a Roman Catholic church.

== History ==
Las Marías barrio-pueblo was in Spain's gazetteers until Puerto Rico was ceded by Spain in the aftermath of the Spanish–American War under the terms of the Treaty of Paris of 1898 and became an unincorporated territory of the United States. In 1899, the United States Department of War conducted a census of Puerto Rico finding that the combined population of Las Marías Pueblo and Maravilla barrios was 1,235. (At the time, the census takers didn't distinguish between the current three separate Maravilla barrios- Maravilla Este, Maravilla Norte and Maravilla Sur).

Historical population
Census	Pop.	Note	%±
1910	1,543		—
1920	1,698		10.0%
1930	1,859		9.5%
1940	391		−79.0%
1950	562		43.7%
1960	511		−9.1%
1970	474		−7.2%
1980	455		−4.0%
1990	280		−38.5%
2000	397		41.8%
2010	262		−34.0%
U.S. Decennial Census; 1900 (N/A) 1910-1930; 1930-1950 1980-2000 2010

== Sectors ==
Barrios (which are, in contemporary times, roughly comparable to minor civil divisions) in turn are further subdivided into smaller local populated place areas/units called sectores (sectors in English). The types of sectores may vary, from normally sector to urbanización to reparto to barriada to residencial, among others.

The following sectors are in Las Marías barrio-pueblo:

Calle Palmer, Calle San Benito, Urbanización Lavergne, and Urbanización Serrano.

== See also ==
- List of communities in Puerto Rico
- List of barrios and sectors of Las Marías, Puerto Rico
