= Maravilla Norte =

Barrio of Las Marías, Puerto Rico

- Barrio
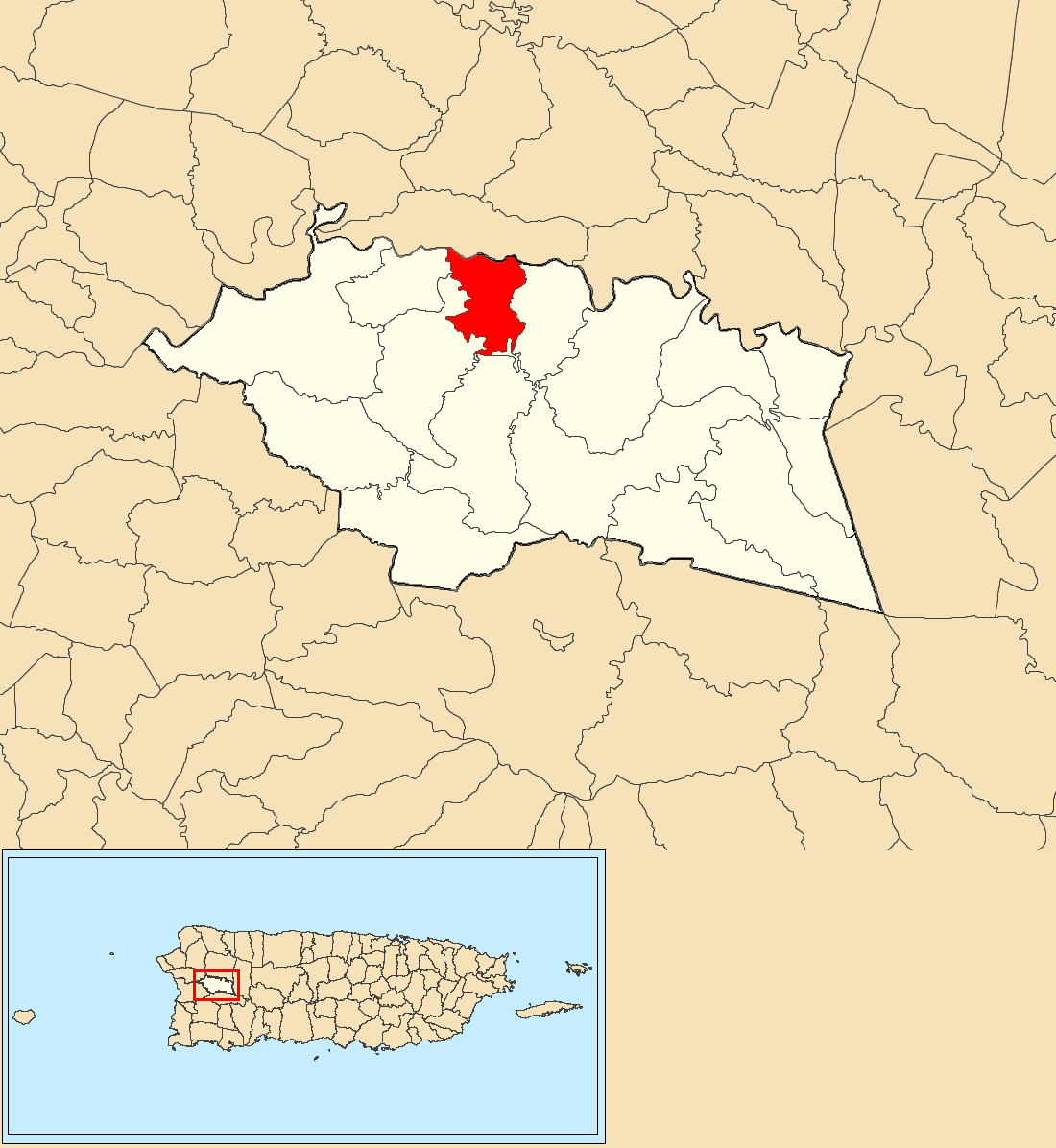
- Location of Maravilla Norte within the municipality of Las Marías shown in red

- Location of Puerto Rico
- Coordinates: 18°15′48″N 66°59′52″W
- Commonwealth: Puerto Rico
- Municipality: Las Marías

Area
  - Total: 1.50 sq mi (3.9 km^{2})
  - Land: 1.49 sq mi (3.9 km^{2})
  - Water: 0.01 sq mi (0.026 km^{2})
- Elevation: 509 ft (155 m)

Population (2010)
  - Total: 580
  - Density: 389.3/sq mi (150.3/km^{2})
- Source: 2010 Census
- Time zone: UTC−4 (AST)

Maravilla Norte is a barrio in the municipality of Las Marías, Puerto Rico. Its population in 2010 was 580.

== History ==
The area was in Spain's gazetteers until Puerto Rico was ceded by Spain in the aftermath of the Spanish–American War under the terms of the Treaty of Paris of 1898 and became an unincorporated territory of the United States. In 1899, the United States Department of War conducted a census of Puerto Rico finding that the combined population of Maravilla barrio and Las Marías Pueblo barrios was 1,235. At the time, the census takers didn't distinguish between the current three separate Maravilla barrios (Maravilla Este, Maravilla Norte and Maravilla Sur).

Historical population
Census	Pop.	Note	%±
1940	505		—
1950	380		−24.8%
1960	303		−20.3%
1970	322		6.3%
1980	472		46.6%
1990	483		2.3%
2000	663		37.3%
2010	580		−12.5%
U.S. Decennial Census; 1900 (N/A) 1910-1930; 1930-1950 1980-2000 2010

== Sectors ==
Barrios (which are, in contemporary times, roughly comparable to minor civil divisions) in turn are further subdivided into smaller local populated place areas/units called sectores (sectors in English). The types of sectores may vary, from normally sector to urbanización to reparto to barriada to residencial, among others.

The following sectors are in Maravilla Norte barrio:

Calle Augusto Cruz, Calle Matías Brughman, Parcelas Lavergne, Parcelas Santaliz, Reparto Santaliz, Sector El Llano, Sector Río Arenas, and Urbanización Estancias Santaliz.

== See also ==
- List of communities in Puerto Rico
- List of barrios and sectors of Las Marías, Puerto Rico
