= Bucarabones, Las Marías, Puerto Rico =

Barrio of Puerto Rico

Bucarabones
- Barrio
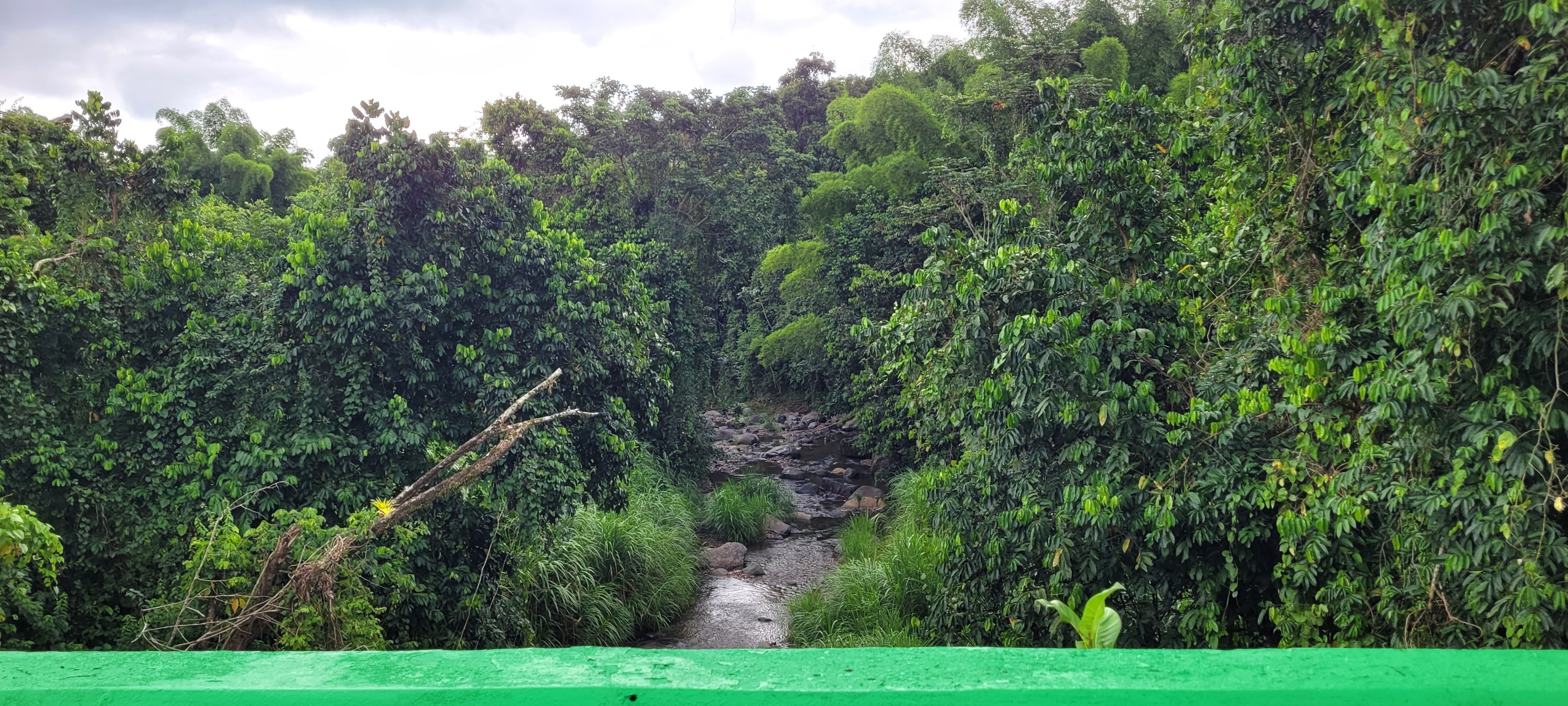
- Bucarabones River between Bucarabones and Cerrote

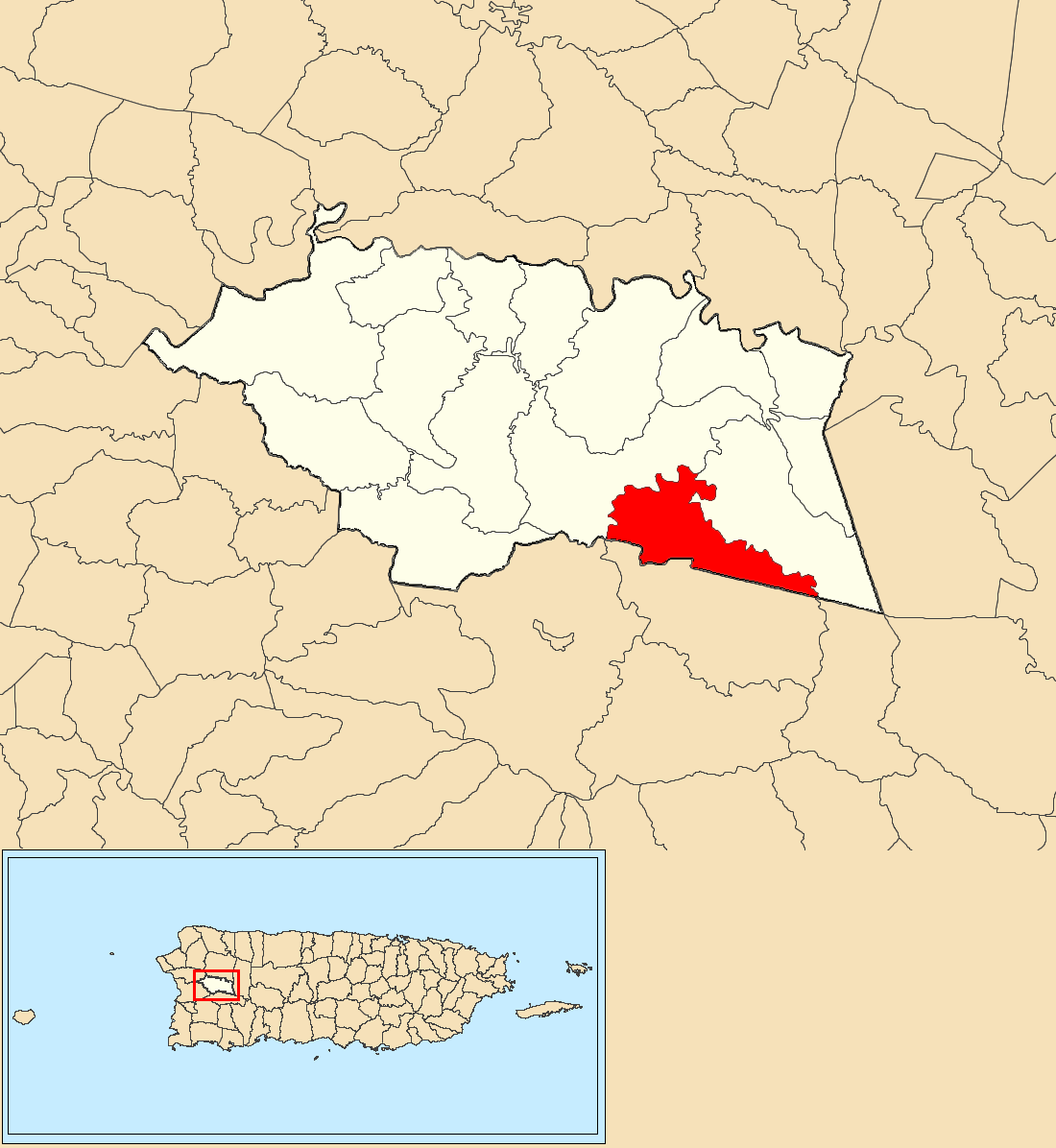
- Location of Bucarabones within the municipality of Las Marías shown in red

- Location of Puerto Rico
- Coordinates: 18°12′27″N 66°56′44″W
- Commonwealth: Puerto Rico
- Municipality: Las Marías

Area
  - Total: 2.89 sq mi (7.5 km^{2})
  - Land: 2.89 sq mi (7.5 km^{2})
  - Water: 0 sq mi (0 km^{2})
- Elevation: 1,024 ft (312 m)

Population (2010)
  - Total: 616
  - Density: 213.1/sq mi (82.3/km^{2})
- Source: 2010 Census
- Time zone: UTC−4 (AST)

Bucarabones is a barrio in the municipality of Las Marías, Puerto Rico. Its population in 2010 was 616.

== History ==
Bucarabones was in Spain's gazetteers until Puerto Rico was ceded by Spain in the aftermath of the Spanish–American War under the terms of the Treaty of Paris of 1898 and became an unincorporated territory of the United States. In 1899, the United States Department of War conducted a census of Puerto Rico finding that the population of Bucarabones barrio was 761.

Historical population
Census	Pop.	Note	%±
1900	761		—
1910	666		−12.5%
1920	749		12.5%
1930	498		−33.5%
1940	433		−13.1%
1950	594		37.2%
1960	594		0.0%
1970	528		−11.1%
1980	668		26.5%
1990	578		−13.5%
2000	598		3.5%
2010	616		3.0%
U.S. Decennial Census; 1899 (shown as 1900) 1910-1930; 1930-1950 1970 1980-2000 2010

== Sectors ==
Barrios (which are, in contemporary times, roughly comparable to minor civil divisions) in turn are further subdivided into smaller local populated place areas/units called sectores (sectors in English). The types of sectores may vary, from normally sector to urbanización to reparto to barriada to residencial, among others.

The following sectors are in Bucarabones barrio:

Sector Guilloty, Sector La Constancia, Sector La Josefa, Sector Magueyes, and Sector Plan Bonito.

== See also ==
- List of communities in Puerto Rico
- List of barrios and sectors of Las Marías, Puerto Rico
