= Río Cañas, Las Marías, Puerto Rico =

Barrio of Puerto Rico

Río Cañas
- Barrio
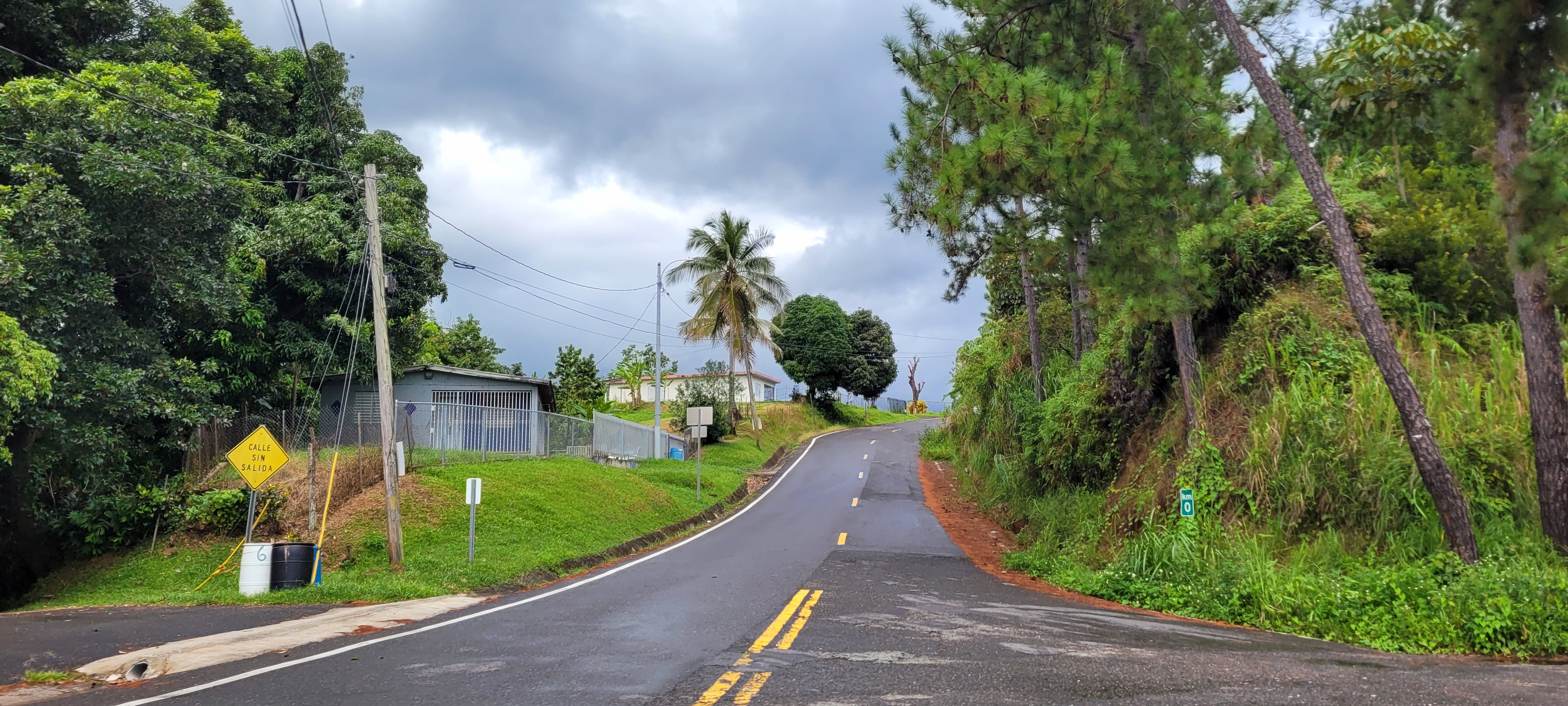
- Puerto Rico Highway 397 between Río Cañas and Furnias

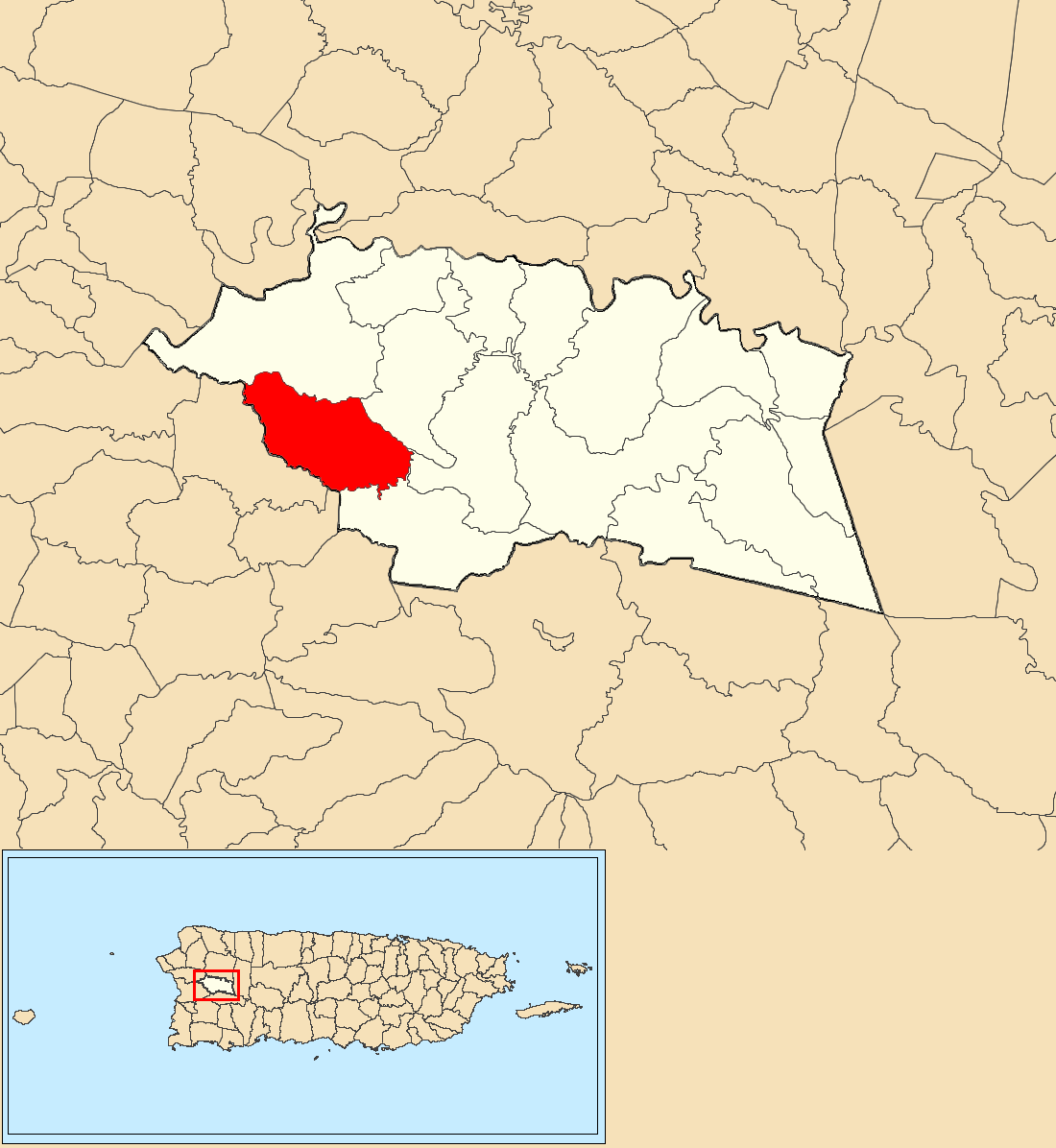
- Location of Río Cañas within the municipality of Las Marías shown in red

- Location of Puerto Rico
- Coordinates: 18°13′55″N 67°02′10″W
- Commonwealth: Puerto Rico
- Municipality: Las Marías

Area
  - Total: 3.16 sq mi (8.2 km^{2})
  - Land: 3.16 sq mi (8.2 km^{2})
  - Water: 0 sq mi (0 km^{2})
- Elevation: 1,033 ft (315 m)

Population (2010)
  - Total: 284
  - Density: 89.9/sq mi (34.7/km^{2})
- Source: 2010 Census
- Time zone: UTC−4 (AST)

Río Cañas is a barrio in the municipality of Las Marías, Puerto Rico. Its population in 2010 was 284.

== History ==
Río Cañas was in Spain's gazetteers until Puerto Rico was ceded by Spain in the aftermath of the Spanish–American War under the terms of the Treaty of Paris of 1898 and became an unincorporated territory of the United States. In 1899, the United States Department of War conducted a census of Puerto Rico finding that the population of Río Cañas barrio was 772.

Historical population
Census	Pop.	Note	%±
1900	772		—
1910	747		−3.2%
1920	846		13.3%
1930	489		−42.2%
1940	651		33.1%
1950	481		−26.1%
1960	351		−27.0%
1970	296		−15.7%
1980	522		76.4%
1990	344		−34.1%
2000	412		19.8%
2010	284		−31.1%
U.S. Decennial Census; 1899 (shown as 1900) 1910-1930; 1930-1950 1980-2000 2010

== Sectors ==
Barrios (which are, in contemporary times, roughly comparable to minor civil divisions) in turn are further subdivided into smaller local populated place areas/units called sectores (sectors in English). The types of sectores may vary, from normally sector to urbanización to reparto to barriada to residencial, among others.

The following sectors are in Río Cañas barrio:

Parcelas El Triunfo, Parcelas La Trapa, Parcelas Plato Indio, Sector Los Martínez, and Sector Merle.

== See also ==
- List of communities in Puerto Rico
- List of barrios and sectors of Las Marías, Puerto Rico
