= Chamorro, Las Marías, Puerto Rico =

Barrio of Puerto Rico

Chamorro
- Barrio
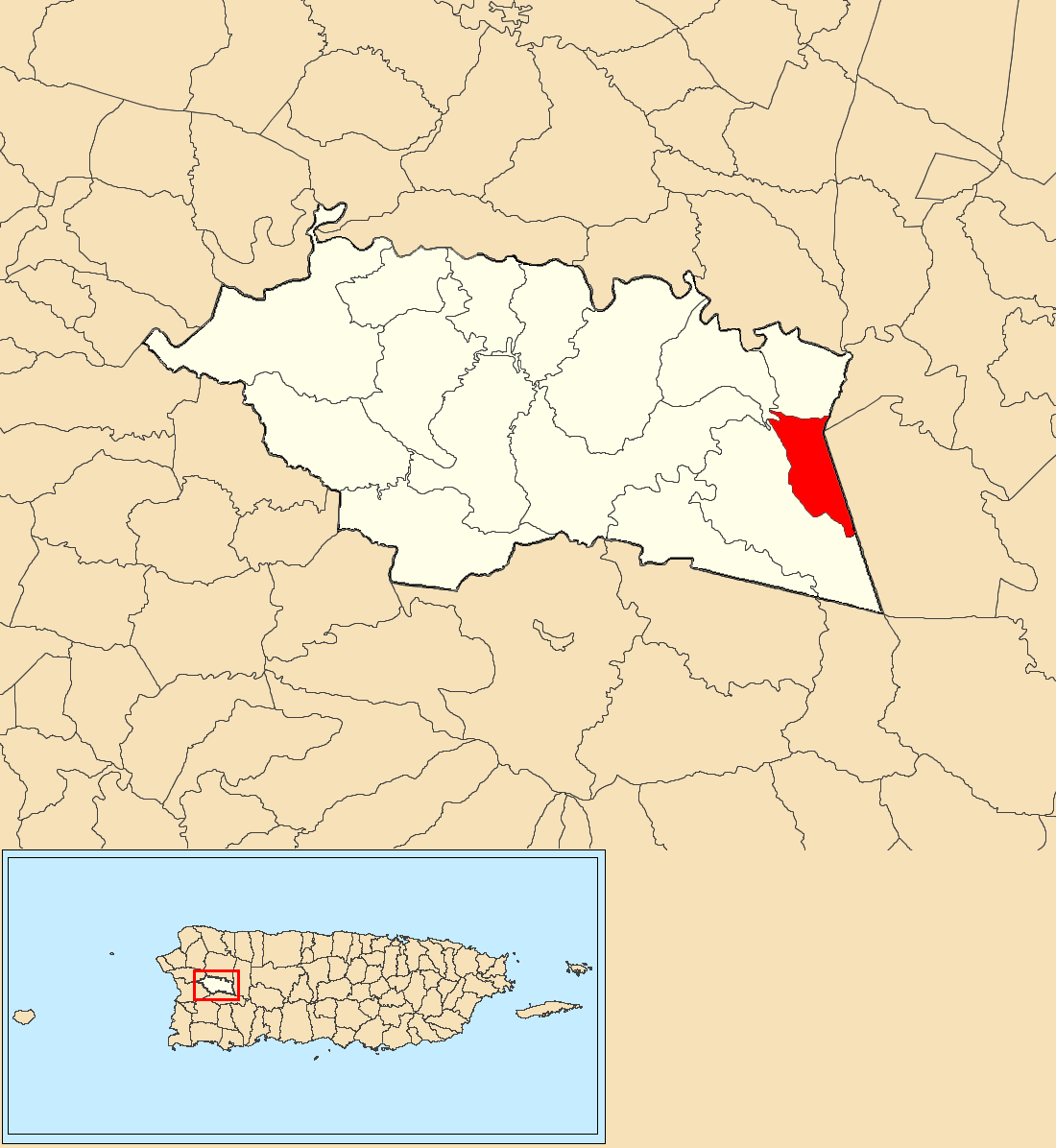
- Location of Chamorro within the municipality of Las Marías shown in red

- Location of Puerto Rico
- Coordinates: 18°13′27″N 66°54′56″W
- Commonwealth: Puerto Rico
- Municipality: Las Marías

Area
  - Total: 1.36 sq mi (3.5 km^{2})
  - Land: 1.36 sq mi (3.5 km^{2})
  - Water: 0 sq mi (0 km^{2})
- Elevation: 997 ft (304 m)

Population (2010)
  - Total: 98
  - Density: 72.1/sq mi (27.8/km^{2})
- Source: 2010 Census
- Time zone: UTC−4 (AST)

Chamorro is a barrio in the municipality of Las Marías, Puerto Rico. Its population in 2010 was 98.

== History ==
Chamorro was in Spain's gazetteers until Puerto Rico was ceded by Spain in the aftermath of the Spanish–American War under the terms of the Treaty of Paris of 1898 and became an unincorporated territory of the United States. In 1899, the United States Department of War conducted a census of Puerto Rico finding that the combined population of Chamorro and Espino barrios was 986.

Historical population
Census	Pop.	Note	%±
1910	385		—
1920	474		23.1%
1930	364		−23.2%
1940	302		−17.0%
1950	249		−17.5%
1960	240		−3.6%
1970	347		44.6%
1980	212		−38.9%
1990	254		19.8%
2000	220		−13.4%
2010	98		−55.5%
U.S. Decennial Census; 1900 (N/A) 1910-1930; 1930-1950 1980-2000 2010

== Sectors ==
Barrios (which are, in contemporary times, roughly comparable to minor civil divisions) in turn are further subdivided into smaller local populated place areas/units called sectores (sectors in English). The types of sectores may vary, from normally sector to urbanización to reparto to barriada to residencial, among others.

The following sectors are in Chamorro barrio:

Parcelas Enseñat, Parcelas Esmoris, Sector La Constancia, Sector Pedro Acevedo, and Sector Vargas.

== See also ==
- List of communities in Puerto Rico
- List of barrios and sectors of Las Marías, Puerto Rico
