= Las Marías, Puerto Rico =

Town and municipality in Puerto Rico

Las Marías Municipio de Las Marías
- Town and Municipality
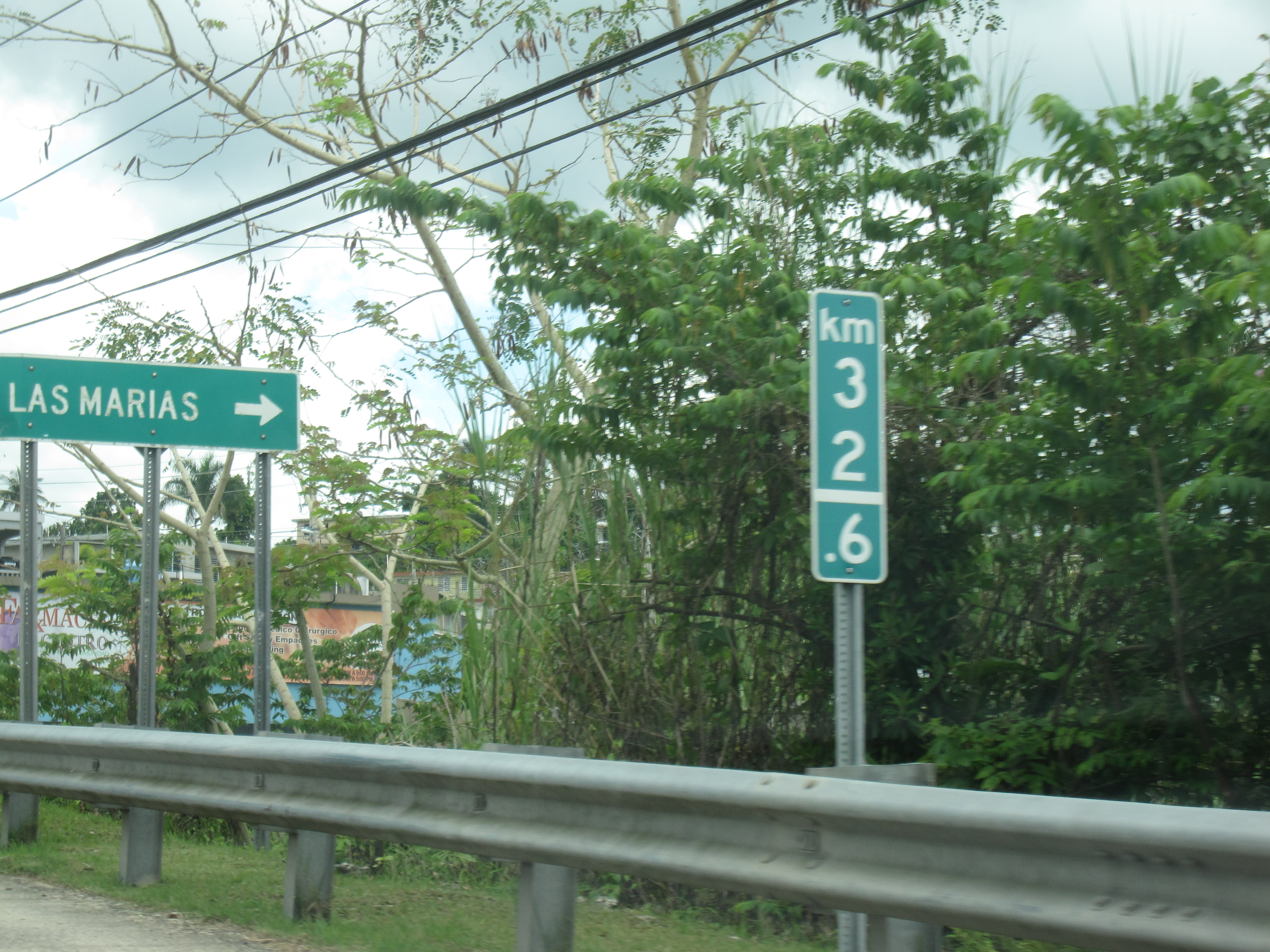
- Sign for Las Marías on Puerto Rico Highway 129

- Flag Coat of arms
- Nicknames: "Pueblo de la China Dulce", "Ciudad de los Cítricos"
- Anthem: "Por tus montes y tus aguas cristalinas"
- Map of Puerto Rico highlighting Las Marías Municipality
- Coordinates: 18°15′5″N 66°59′36″W
- Sovereign state: United States
- Commonwealth: Puerto Rico
- Settled: 1842
- Founded: July 1, 1871
- Founder: Don Benito Recio y Moreno
- Barrios: 16 barrios: Alto Sano; Anones; Bucarabones; Buena Vista; Cerrote; Chamorro; Espino; Furnias; Las Marías barrio-pueblo; Maravilla Este; Maravilla Norte; Maravilla Sur; Naranjales; Palma Escrita; Purísima Concepción; Río Cañas

Government
  - Mayor: Edwin Soto Santiago (NPP)
  - Senatorial dist.: 4 - Mayagüez
  - Representative dist.: 16

Area
  - Total: 46.51 sq mi (120.5 km^{2})
  - Land: 46.36 sq mi (120.1 km^{2})
  - Water: .11 sq mi (0.28 km^{2})

Population (2020)
  - Total: 8,874
  - Estimate (2025): 8,638 ▼
  - Rank: 75th in Puerto Rico
  - Density: 191.4/sq mi (73.91/km^{2})
- Demonym: Marieños
- Time zone: UTC−4 (AST)
- ZIP Code: 00670
- Area code: 787/939

Las Marías (Spanish pronunciation: [las maˈrias], locally [ˌlaʔ maˈɾiaʔ]) is a town and municipality of Puerto Rico located north of Maricao; southeast of Añasco; south of San Sebastián; east of Mayagüez; and west of Lares. Las Marías is spread over 15 barrios and Las Marías Pueblo (the downtown area and the administrative center of the city).

== History ==
Las Marías was founded on July 1, 1871. Don Benito Recio y Moreno was the acting mayor during the founding of Las Marías.

Puerto Rico was ceded by Spain in the aftermath of the Spanish–American War under the terms of the Treaty of Paris of 1898 and became a colony of the United States. It remains so today. In 1899, the United States Department of War conducted a census of Puerto Rico finding that the population of Las Marías was 11,279.

On September 20, 2017 Hurricane Maria struck the island of Puerto Rico. In Las Marías, multiple landslides left highways covered in mud, trees and debris. In some areas of Las Marías there were more than 25 landslides per square mile due to the significant amount of rainfall and wind.

== Geography ==
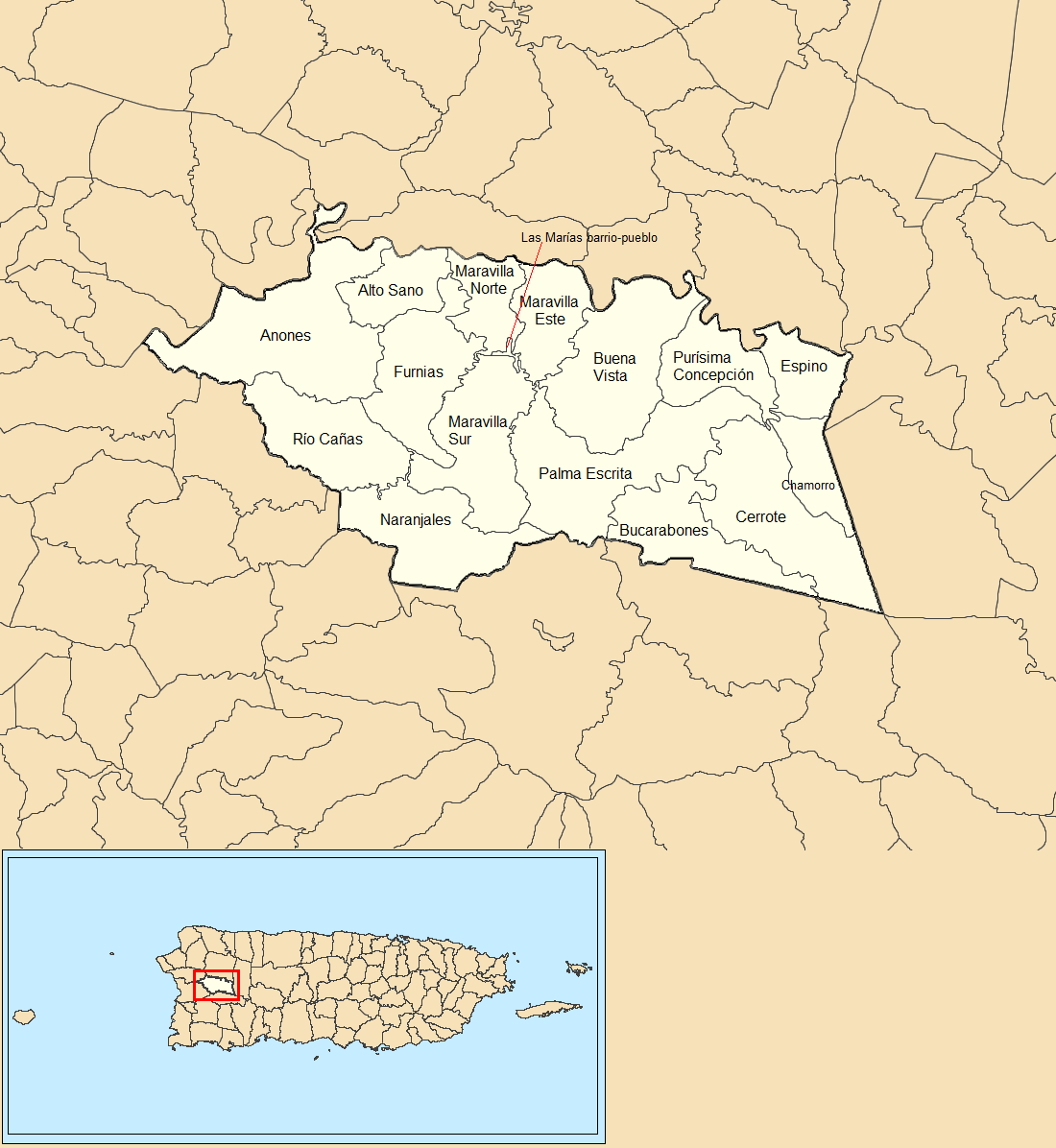
Subdivisions of Las Marías

Las Marías is located on the central western side of Puerto Rico. According to the 2010 U.S. Census Bureau, the municipality has a total area of 46.51 square miles (120.5 km^{2}), of which 46.36 square miles (120.1 km^{2}) is land and 0.11 square mile (0.28 km^{2}) is water.

Río Grande de Añasco (also known as Río Guacio) is located in Las Marías.

=== Barrios ===
Like all municipalities of Puerto Rico, Las Marías is subdivided into barrios. The municipal buildings, central square and large Catholic church are located near the center of the municipality, in a small barrio referred to as "el pueblo".

1. Alto Sano
2. Anones
3. Bucarabones
4. Buena Vista
5. Cerrote
6. Chamorro
7. Espino
8. Furnias
9. Las Marías barrio-pueblo
10. Maravilla Este
11. Maravilla Norte
12. Maravilla Sur
13. Naranjales
14. Palma Escrita
15. Purísima Concepción
16. Río Cañas

=== Sectors ===
Barrios (which are like minor civil divisions) are further subdivided into smaller areas called sectores (sectors in English). The types of sectores may vary, from normally sector to urbanización to reparto to barriada to residencial, among others.

=== Special Communities ===
Comunidades Especiales de Puerto Rico (Special Communities of Puerto Rico) are marginalized communities whose citizens are experiencing a certain amount of social exclusion. A map shows these communities occur in nearly every municipality of the commonwealth. Of the 742 places that were on the list in 2014, the following 7 sectors were in Adjuntas: Sector La Josefa in Bucarabones, Sector Bryan in Cerróte, Sector Chamorro in Cerróte, Sector Palo Prieto in Palma Escrita, Sector Plato Indio in Río Cañas, Las Juanitas in Furnias, and Sector Santa Rosa in Furnias.

== Demographics ==
Historical population
Census	Pop.	Note	%±
1900	11,279		—
1910	10,046		−10.9%
1920	10,736		6.9%
1930	8,881		−17.3%
1940	9,626		8.4%
1950	10,807		12.3%
1960	9,237		−14.5%
1970	7,841		−15.1%
1980	8,747		11.6%
1990	9,306		6.4%
2000	11,061		18.9%
2010	9,881		−10.7%
2020	8,874		−10.2%
2025 (est.)	8,638	▼	−2.7%
U.S. Decennial Census; 1899 (shown as 1900) 1910-1930; 1930-1950 1960-2000 2010 2020

== Tourism ==
Paradise Camping Coffee Farm is a place for ecotourism and camping in Las Marías.

=== Landmarks and places of interest ===
Places of interest in Las Marías include:

- La Casona de Artemio
- Hacienda Palma Escrita
- Hacienda Frontera
- Finca Enseñat

== Economy ==
=== Agriculture ===
- Agriculture: bananas, coffee, and citrus.

=== Industry ===
- Manufacturing: clothing.

== Culture ==
=== Festivals and events ===
Las Marías celebrates its patron saint festival in December. The Fiestas Patronales Inmaculada Concepción de María is a religious and cultural celebration that generally features parades, games, artisans, amusement rides, regional food, and live entertainment.

Other festivals and events celebrated in Las Marías include:

- January - Three King's Festival
- March - Orange Festival (Festival de las Chinas). At the 2019 festival, a big name band, El Gran Combo performed at the festival, and a group of troubadours from Cuba performed with local Puerto Rican troubadours.
- March - Festival to commemorate the founding of Las Marías (Festival de Las Marías)

== Government ==
Like all municipalities in Puerto Rico, Las Marías is administered by a mayor. The current mayor is Edwin Soto Santiago, from the New Progressive Party (PNP). Soto Santiago was re-elected during the 2016 general election, having previously served office from 1997 to 2013.

The city belongs to the Puerto Rico Senatorial district IV, which is represented by two Senators. In 2024, Jeison Rosa and Karen Michelle Román Rodríguez were elected as District Senators, while Emilio Carlo was elected the District Representative.

== Transportation ==
There are 13 bridges in Las Marías.

== Symbols ==
The municipio has an official flag and coat of arms.

=== Flag ===
The flag is divided by a diagonal line whose ends are the upper left angle of the flag and the opposite lower angle. The upper part is yellow and the lower half is green. The yellow portion represents the sun bathing the town and the green portion represents the nature and vegetation of the municipality.

=== Coat of arms ===
The shield is divided into six parts with three in silver and three in blue. A María tree (Calophylum brasiliense antillanum), with a pair of coffee tree branches to the sides of its trunk, adorns each silver part. The monogram and crown of Nuestra Señora la Santísima Virgen de Plata is placed in the top center portion of the shield. The shield's border is red with a broken chain at the bottom. Above the shield resides three tower crown in gold.

== See also ==
- List of Puerto Ricans
- History of Puerto Rico
- Did you know-Puerto Rico?
