= Maravilla Sur =

Barrio of Las Marías, Puerto Rico

- Barrio
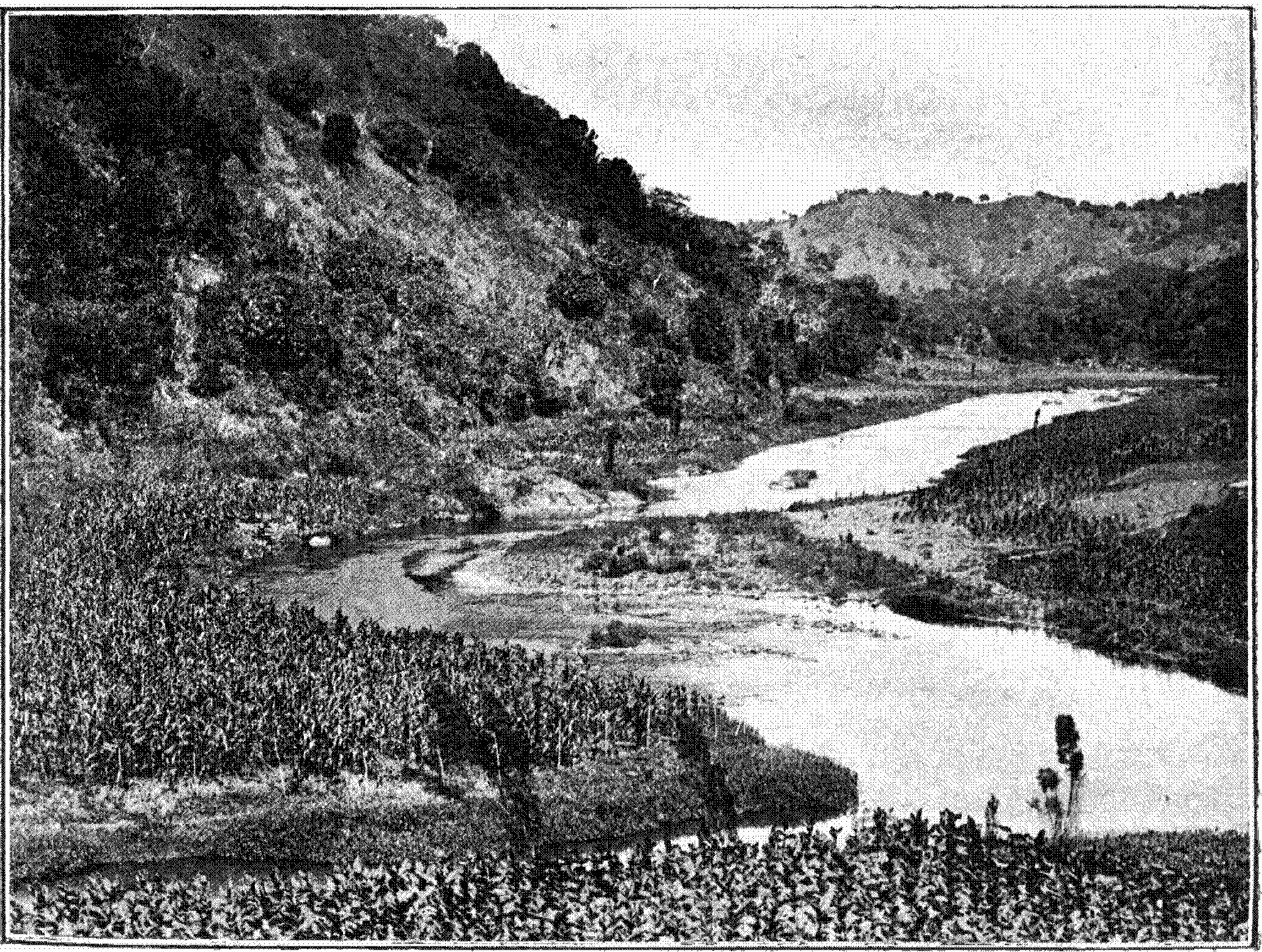
- Historic picture where rivers converge in Mayagüecillo (c. 1898)

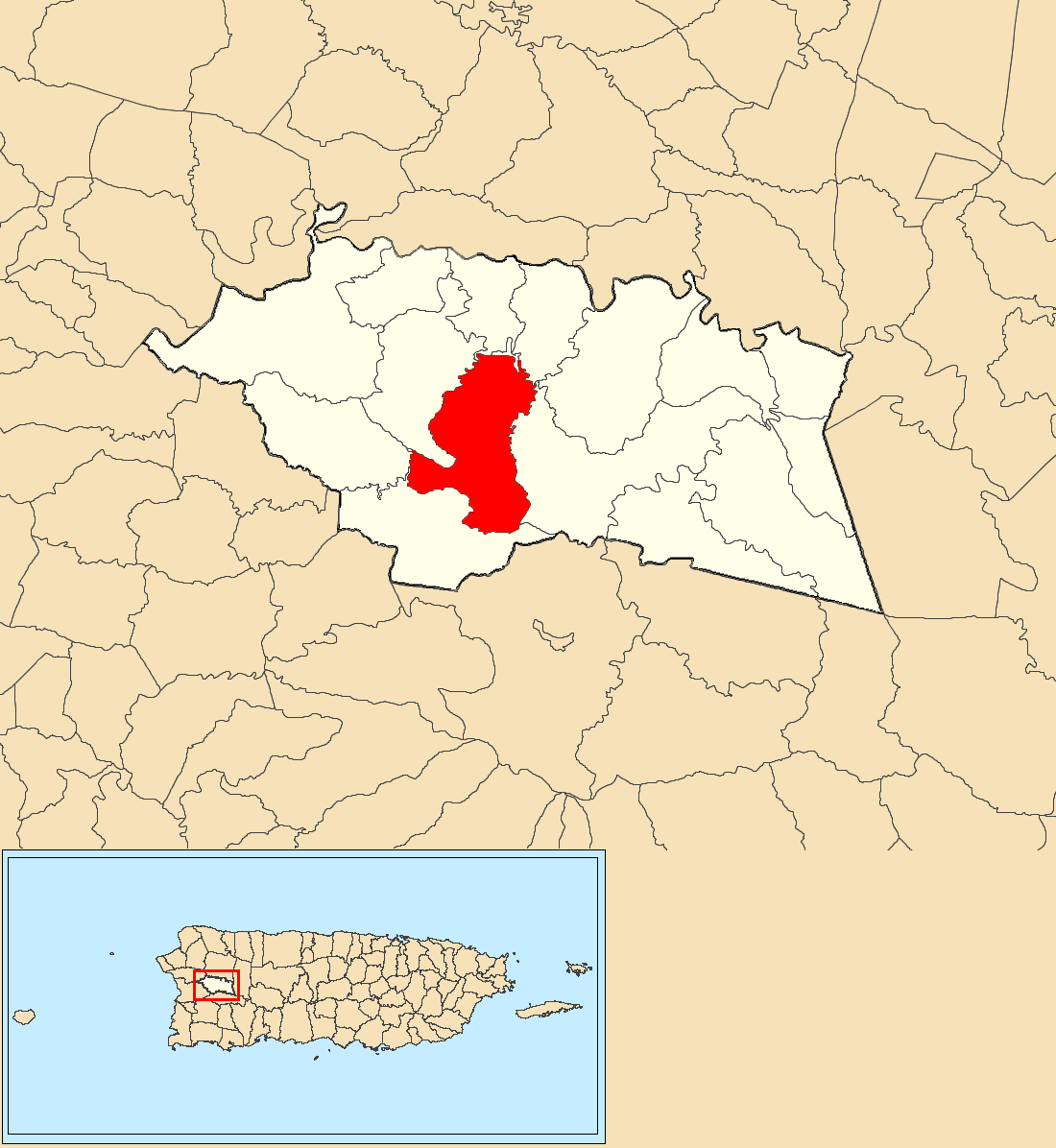
- Location of Maravilla Sur within the municipality of Las Marías shown in red

- Location of Puerto Rico
- Coordinates: 18°13′48″N 66°59′52″W
- Commonwealth: Puerto Rico
- Municipality: Las Marías

Area
  - Total: 3.63 sq mi (9.4 km^{2})
  - Land: 3.63 sq mi (9.4 km^{2})
  - Water: 0 sq mi (0 km^{2})
- Elevation: 1,102 ft (336 m)

Population (2010)
  - Total: 1,934
  - Density: 532.8/sq mi (205.7/km^{2})
- Source: 2010 Census
- Time zone: UTC−4 (AST)

Maravilla Sur is a barrio in the municipality of Las Marías, Puerto Rico. Its population in 2010 was 1,934.

== History ==
The area was in Spain's gazetteers until Puerto Rico was ceded by Spain in the aftermath of the Spanish–American War under the terms of the Treaty of Paris of 1898 and became an unincorporated territory of the United States. In 1899, the United States Department of War conducted a census of Puerto Rico finding that the combined population of Maravilla and Las Marías Pueblo barrios was 1,235. At the time, the census takers didn't distinguish between the current three separate Maravilla barrios (Maravilla Este, Maravilla Norte and Maravilla Sur).

Historical population
| Census | Pop. | Note | %± |
|---|---|---|---|
| 1940 | 586 | | — |
| 1950 | 747 | | 27.5% |
| 1960 | 577 | | −22.8% |
| 1970 | 476 | | −17.5% |
| 1980 | 650 | | 36.6% |
| 1990 | 1,527 | | 134.9% |
| 2000 | 1,899 | | 24.4% |
| 2010 | 1,934 | | 1.8% |
U.S. Decennial Census; 1900 (N/A) 1910-1930; 1930-1950 1980-2000 2010

== Sectors ==
Barrios (which are, in contemporary times, roughly comparable to minor civil divisions) in turn are further subdivided into smaller local populated place areas/units called sectores (sectors in English). The types of sectores may vary, from normally sector to urbanización to reparto to barriada to residencial, among others.

The following sectors are in Maravilla Sur barrio:

Residencial Jardines, Río Arenas Apartments, Sector La Candelaria, Sector La Milagrosa, Sector La Trapa, Sector Mayagüecillo, Urbanización Colinas de María, Urbanización El Bosque, Urbanización El Coquí, and Urbanización Inmaculado Corazón de María.

== See also ==
- List of communities in Puerto Rico
- List of barrios and sectors of Las Marías, Puerto Rico
