= Alto Sano, Las Marías, Puerto Rico =

Barrio of Puerto Rico

Alto Sano
- Barrio
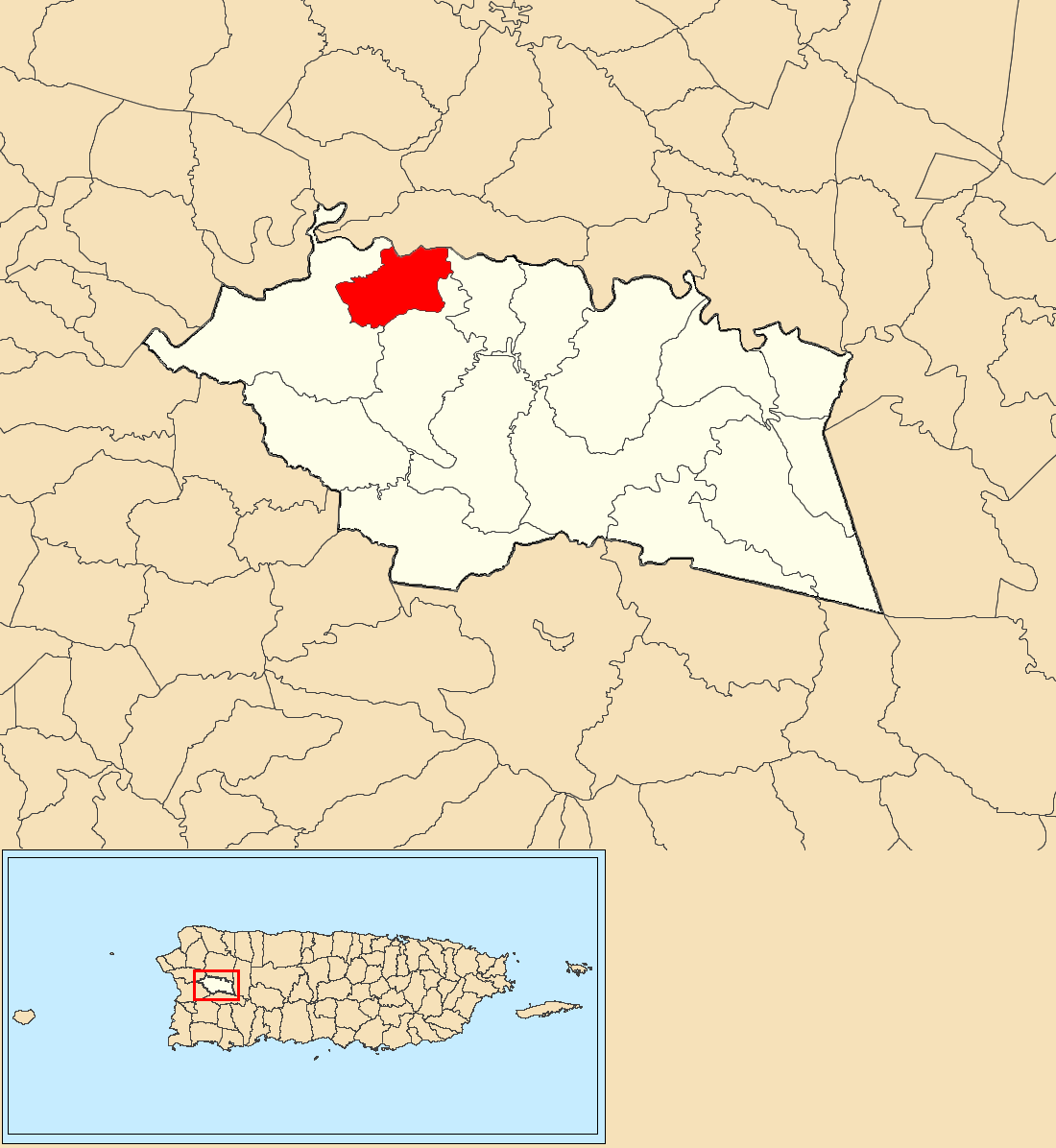
- Location of Alto Sano within the municipality of Las Marías shown in red

- Location of Puerto Rico
- Coordinates: 18°16′06″N 67°01′07″W
- Commonwealth: Puerto Rico
- Municipality: Las Marías

Area
  - Total: 1.64 sq mi (4.2 km^{2})
  - Land: 1.63 sq mi (4.2 km^{2})
  - Water: 0.01 sq mi (0.026 km^{2})
- Elevation: 466 ft (142 m)

Population (2010)
  - Total: 179
  - Density: 109.1/sq mi (42.1/km^{2})
- Source: 2010 Census
- Time zone: UTC−4 (AST)

Alto Sano is a barrio in the municipality of Las Marías, Puerto Rico. Its population in 2010 was 179.

== History ==
Alto Sano was in Spain's gazetteers until Puerto Rico was ceded by Spain in the aftermath of the Spanish–American War under the terms of the Treaty of Paris of 1898 and became an unincorporated territory of the United States. In 1899, the United States Department of War conducted a census of Puerto Rico finding that the population of Alto Sano barrio was 885.

Historical population
Census	Pop.	Note	%±
1900	885		—
1910	432		−51.2%
1920	386		−10.6%
1930	317		−17.9%
1940	325		2.5%
1950	214		−34.2%
1960	132		−38.3%
1970	110		−16.7%
1980	110		0.0%
1990	148		34.5%
2000	145		−2.0%
2010	179		23.4%
U.S. Decennial Census; 1899 (shown as 1900) 1910-1930; 1930-1950 1980-2000 2010

== Sectors ==
Barrios (which are, in contemporary times, roughly comparable to minor civil divisions) in turn are further subdivided into smaller local populated place areas/units called sectores (sectors in English). The types of sectores may vary, from normally sector to urbanización to reparto to barriada to residencial, among others.

The following sectors are in Alto Sano barrio:

Sector Alto Sano Interior.

== See also ==
- List of communities in Puerto Rico
- List of barrios and sectors of Las Marías, Puerto Rico
