= Hato Arriba, San Sebastián, Puerto Rico =

Barrio of Puerto Rico

Hato Arriba
- Barrio
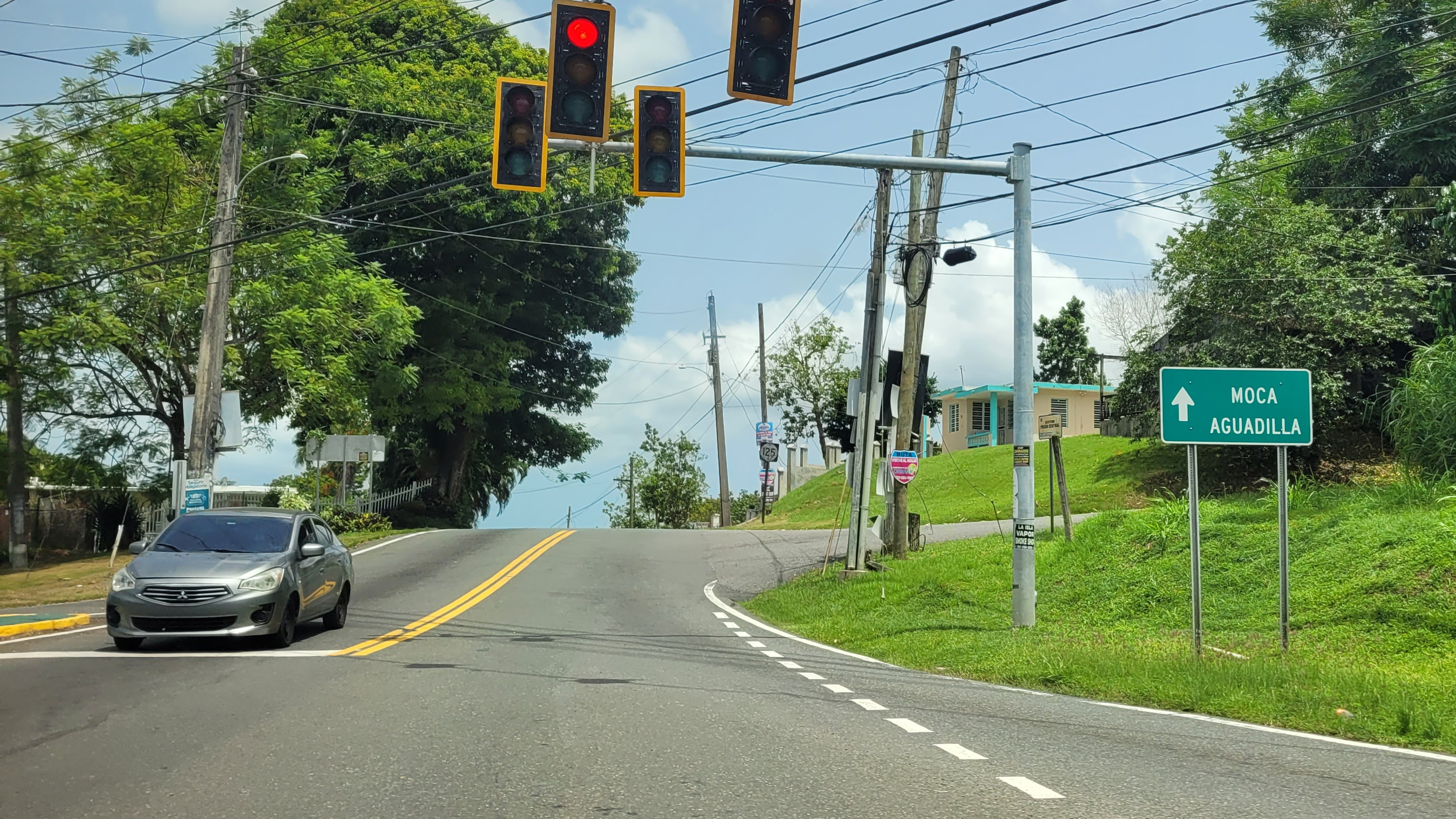
- Puerto Rico Highway 125 between Guatemala and Hato Arriba

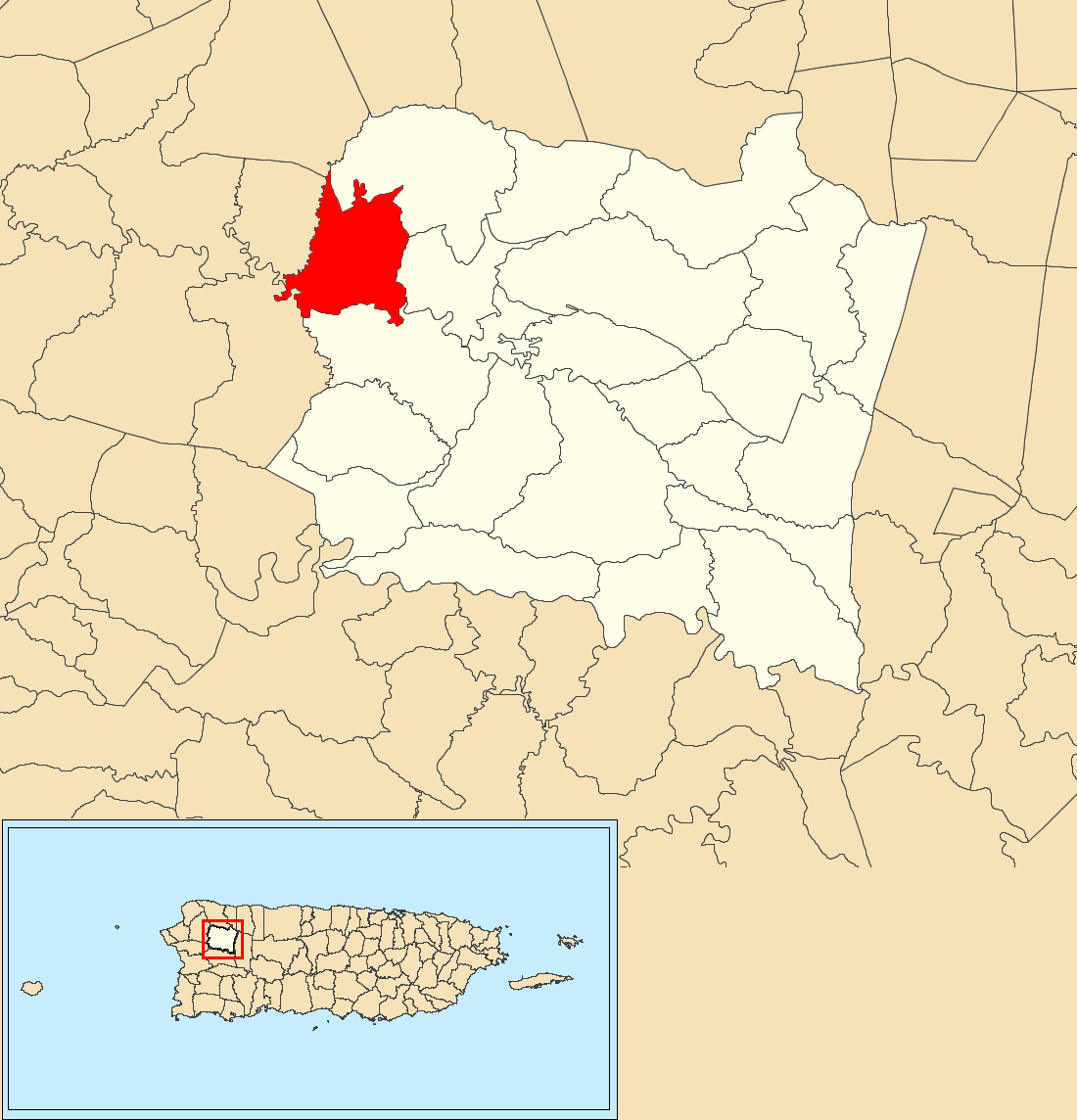
- Location of Hato Arriba within the municipality of San Sebastián shown in red

- Location of Puerto Rico
- Coordinates: 18°21′29″N 67°01′52″W
- Commonwealth: Puerto Rico
- Municipality: San Sebastián

Area
  - Total: 2.96 sq mi (7.7 km^{2})
  - Land: 2.96 sq mi (7.7 km^{2})
  - Water: 0 sq mi (0 km^{2})
- Elevation: 246 ft (75 m)

Population (2010)
  - Total: 1,980
  - Density: 668.9/sq mi (258.3/km^{2})
- Source: 2010 Census
- Time zone: UTC−4 (AST)

Hato Arriba is a barrio in the municipality of San Sebastián, Puerto Rico. Its population in 2010 was 1,980.

== History ==
Hato Arriba was in Spain's gazetteers until Puerto Rico was ceded by Spain in the aftermath of the Spanish–American War under the terms of the Treaty of Paris of 1898 and became an unincorporated territory of the United States. In 1899, the United States Department of War conducted a census of Puerto Rico finding that the population of Hato Arriba barrio was 663.

Historical population
Census	Pop.	Note	%±
1900	663		—
1910	785		18.4%
1920	944		20.3%
1930	1,217		28.9%
1940	1,412		16.0%
1950	1,249		−11.5%
1960	1,123		−10.1%
1970	1,467		30.6%
1980	1,467		0.0%
1990	1,728		17.8%
2000	1,991		15.2%
2010	1,980		−0.6%
U.S. Decennial Census; 1899 (shown as 1900) 1910-1930; 1930-1950 1980-2000 2010

== PR-111 and PR-119 ==
On September 20, 2017, a section of PR-111 in Hato Arriba "almost disappeared completed" according to witnesses of the effects of Hurricane Maria. In late May 2019, a lane of PR-119, a principal road in Hato Arriba, collapsed due to heavy rain. This highway had experienced a visible depression with Hurricane Maria in 2017 and was on a project waiting list when it collapsed further.

== Sectors ==
Barrios (which are, in contemporary times, roughly comparable to minor civil divisions) in turn are further subdivided into smaller local populated place areas/units called sectores (sectors in English). The types of sectores may vary, from normally sector to urbanización to reparto to barriada to residencial, among others.

The following sectors are in Hato Arriba barrio:

Carretera 111, Carretera 125, Carretera 423, Parcelas Hato Arriba, Sector Anglada, Sector Bernal, Sector Campo Alegre, Sector Caña Verde, Sector Cuesta La Luna, Sector Hoyo Frío, Sector Hoyo Santo, Sector Medina, Sector Nando Rivera, Sector Paseo Central, Sector Punta Brava, Sector Santo Torres, Urbanización Colinas de Hato Arriba, and Urbanización Lomas Verdes.

== See also ==
- List of communities in Puerto Rico
- List of barrios and sectors of San Sebastián, Puerto Rico
