= List of barrios and sectors of San Sebastián, Puerto Rico =

Like all municipalities of Puerto Rico, San Sebastián is subdivided into administrative units called barrios, which are, in contemporary times, roughly comparable to minor civil divisions, (and means wards or boroughs or neighborhoods in English). The barrios and subbarrios, in turn, are further subdivided into smaller local populated place areas/units called sectores (sectors in English). The types of sectores may vary, from normally sector to urbanización to reparto to barriada to residencial, among others.

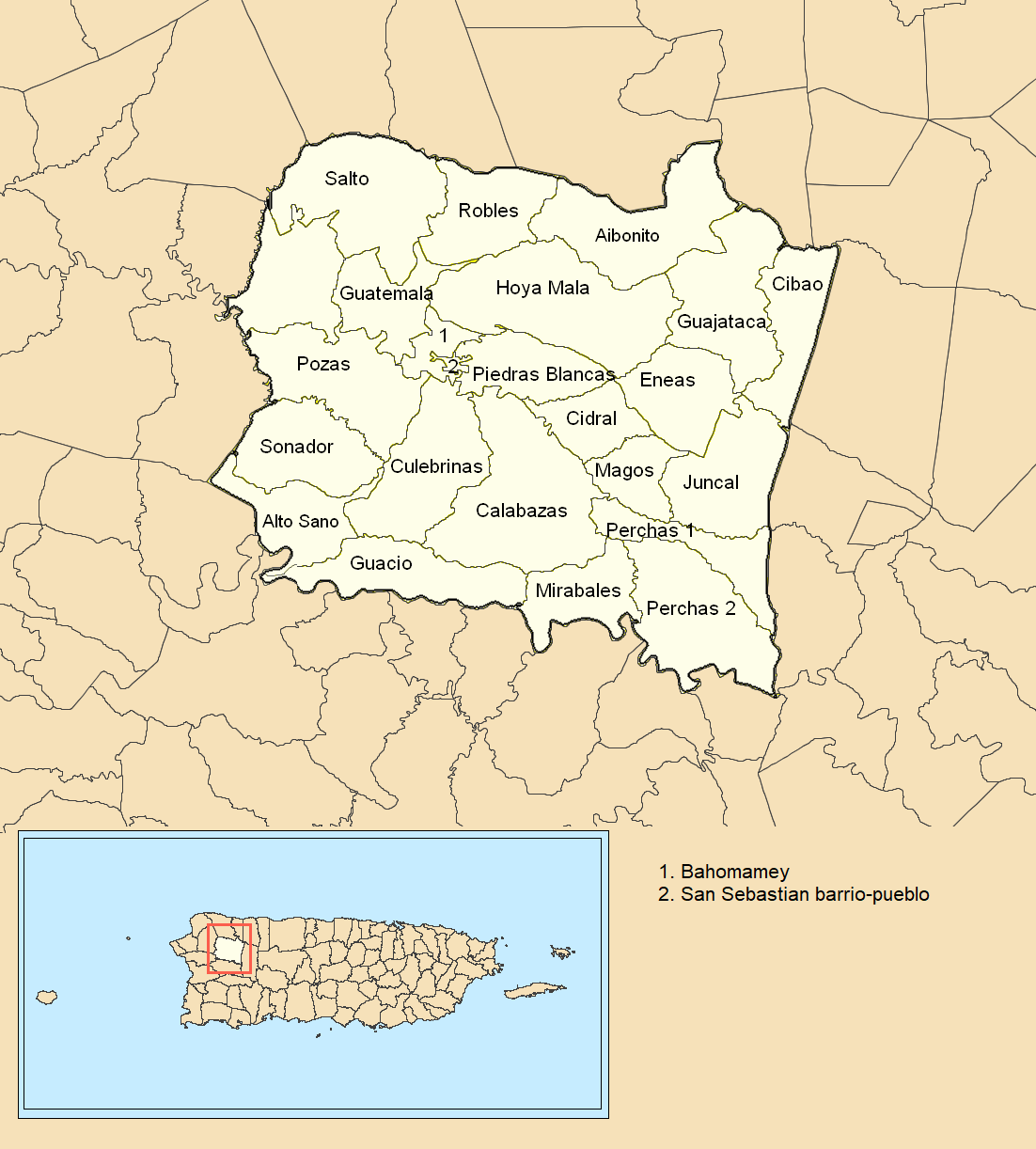
San Sebastián map with barrio subdivisions

== List of sectors by barrio ==
=== Aibonito ===
- Barrio Aibonito Beltrán
- Barrio Aibonito Guerrero
- Carretera 119
- Carretera 447
- Carretera 457
- Nayo Méndez
- Sector Adames
- Sector Agustín Rodríguez
- Sector Casa del Biólogo
- Sector Ciquito López
- Sector Cruz Lugo
- Sector El Maní
- Sector Fano Mercado
- Sector Gelo Esteves
- Sector Goyo Guerrero
- Sector Lalo Jiménez
- Sector Las Cruces
- Sector Lilo Méndez
- Sector Los Malavé
- Sector Los Pérez
- Sector Los Rodríguez
- Sector Medina
- Sector Millo Méndez (Cardona Méndez)
- Sector Morales
- Sector Onofre Cardona (Mino Rosa)
- Sector Santos González
- Sector Valentín
- Urbanización Lomas de Aibonito Guerrero

=== Alto Sano ===
- Carretera 109
- Sector El Cuartelillo
- Sector Los Ramírez

=== Bahomamey ===
- Barriada Pueblo Nuevo
- Barriada Stalingrado
- Barriada Tablastilla
- Calle Juan F. Cortés
- Sector Chinto Rodón
- Urbanización Guayabal
- Urbanización Olivencia

=== Calabazas ===
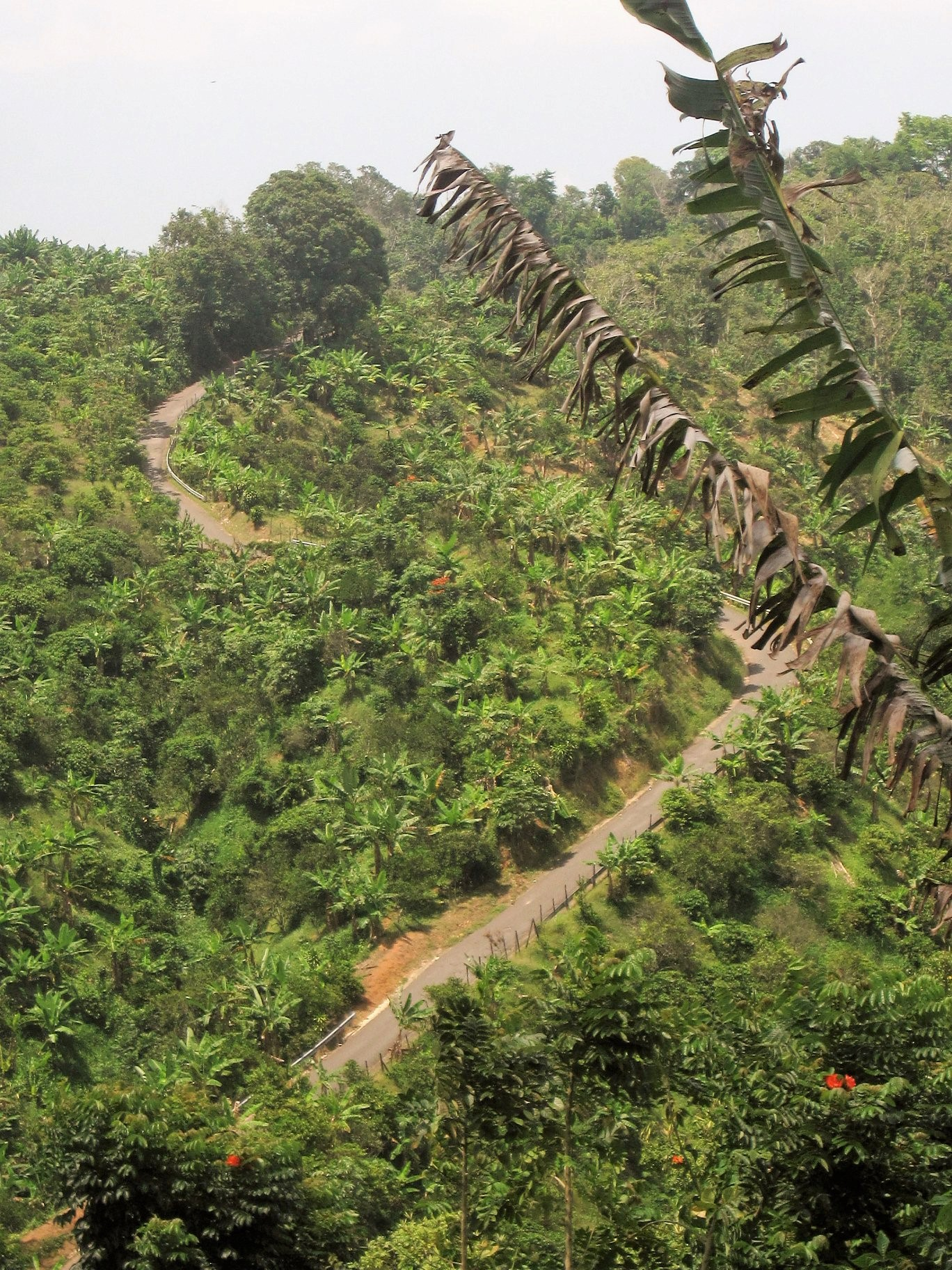
Cuesta de Magos, long, steep hill on PR-438 heading to Río Culebrinas, photographed with zoom lens from barrio Calabazas

- Carretera 111
- Carretera 4435
- Residencial Jardines de Piedras Blancas
- Sector Audeliz Torres
- Sector Bartolo Cordero
- Sector Cataño
- Sector El Refugio
- Sector Jandino Ruiz
- Sector La Loma
- Sector Los Tanques
- Sector Lupe Mártir
- Sector Mamey
- Sector Orta
- Sector Pablo Nieves (Los Pinos)
- Sector Quinto Ríos
- Sector Rancho Grande
- Sector Rubén Hernández
- Sector Toño Mestre
- Urbanización Jardines Villy Ana
- Urbanización Raholisa
- Urbanización Venturini
- Urbanización Villas de Piedras Blancas

=== Cibao ===
- Avenida Emérito Estrada Rivera
- Carretera 451
- Carretera 455
- Cibao Abrahonda
- Comunidad González
- Parcelas Montaña de Piedra
- Residencial Andrés Méndez Liciaga
- Residencial San Andrés
- Sector Ango Román
- Sector Finca Los Robles
- Sector La Gallera
- Sector Ortíz
- Sector Pablo Rivera
- Sector Pueblito
- Sector Pueblo Nuevo
- Sector Quiles
- Urbanización Colinas Verdes
- Urbanización Montaña de Piedra
- Urbanización Pepino

=== Cidral ===
- Carretera 450
- Sector La Laguna
- Sector Los Rosario
- Sector Martínez
- Sector Mín Pérez
- Sector Nolo González
- Sector Palmarito
- Sector Pancho Soto
- Sector Tomassini

=== Culebrinas ===
- Calle Torres Pino
- Carretera 109
- Sector Bernal
- Sector Flores Rivera
- Sector Juancho Román
- Sector Lin Ríos
- Sector Los Nobles
- Sector Peter Hernández
- Sector Pozas Central
- Sector Quebrada Larga
- Sector Toño Rosa
- Sector Rincón
- Urbanización Ciudad de Oro
- Urbanización El Culebrinas
- Urbanización La Estancia
- Urbanización Mansiones del Culebrinas

=== Eneas ===
- Sector Brignoni
- Sector Delia Ramos
- Sector Loma Alta

=== Guacio ===
- Carretera 119
- Carretera 424
- Carretera 433
- Parcelas El Guacio
- Parcelas Marco Antonio
- Sector Boquerón
- Sector Campamento Boys Scouts
- Sector Domenech
- Sector Inglés
- Sector Lulo Rivera
- Sector Tosquero

=== Guajataca ===
- Carretera 455
- Sector Colo Medina
- Sector Confesor Soto
- Sector Empalme
- Sector Fondo del Saco
- Sector Lebrón
- Sector Los Vázquez
- Sector Millo Matos
- Sector Roberto Jiménez
- Sector Román
- Sector Salto Collazo
- Sector Sico Aponte
- Sector Toño Fuentes
- Sector Varela
- Sector Yeyo González

=== Guatemala ===
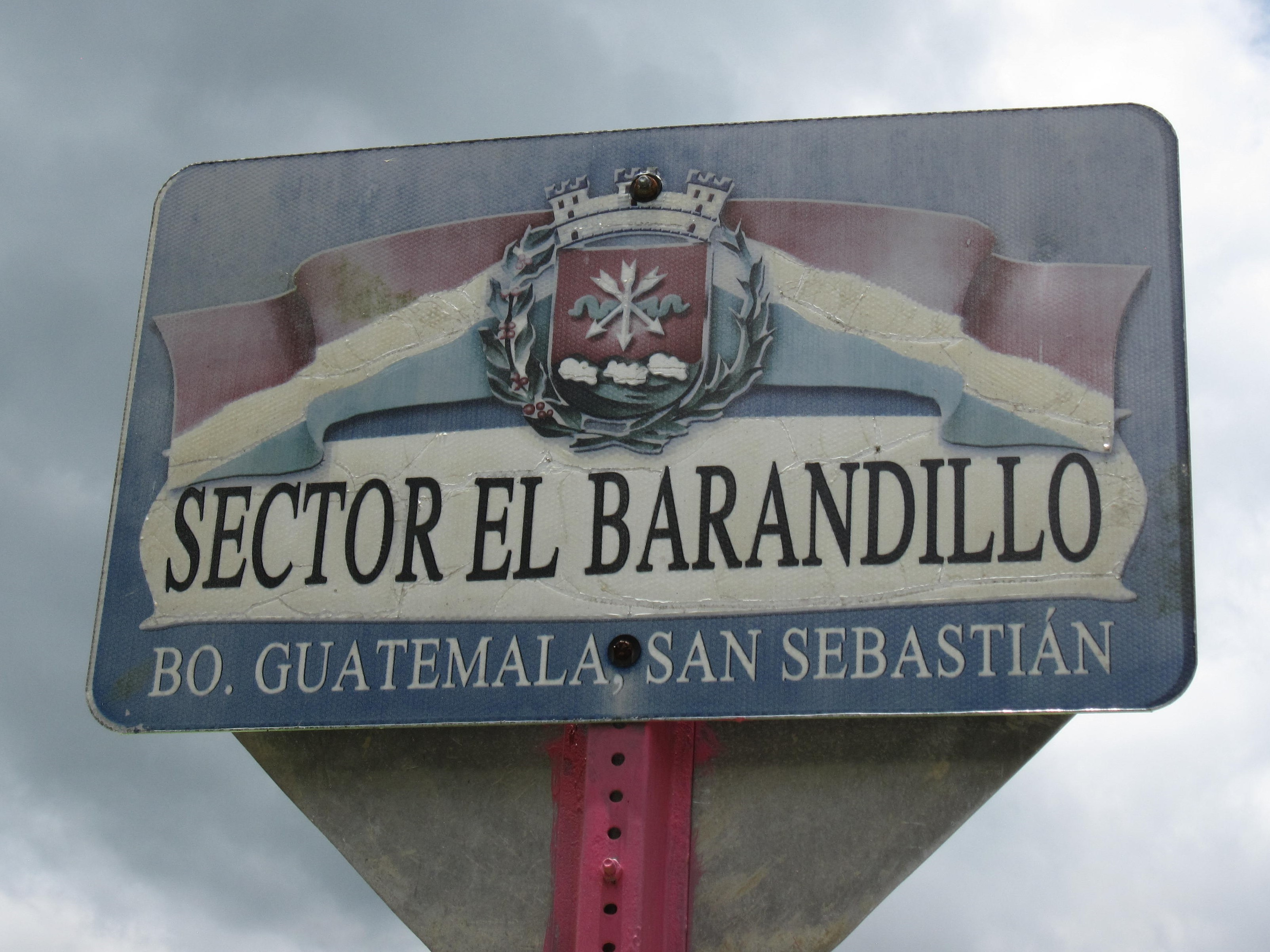
Sector El Barrandillo in Guatemala

- Avenida Emérito Estrada Rivera
- Carretera 111
- Carretera 125
- Carretera 445
- Carretera 446
- Sector Barandillo
- Sector Bejuco
- Sector Central Plata
- Sector Colón
- Sector Goyin Rámirez
- Sector Javilla
- Sector Laberinto
- Sector La Vega
- Sector Marcelo Pérez
- Sector Méndez
- Sector Peña
- Sector Rincón (Gozalandia)
- Sector Salsipuedes
- Sector Torres
- Urbanización Extensión Villa Rita
- Urbanización Jardines de Guatemala
- Urbanización Mansiones de Loma Linda
- Urbanización San Antonio de La Plata
- Urbanización San Carmelo de la Plata
- Urbanización Villa Rita

=== Hato Arriba ===
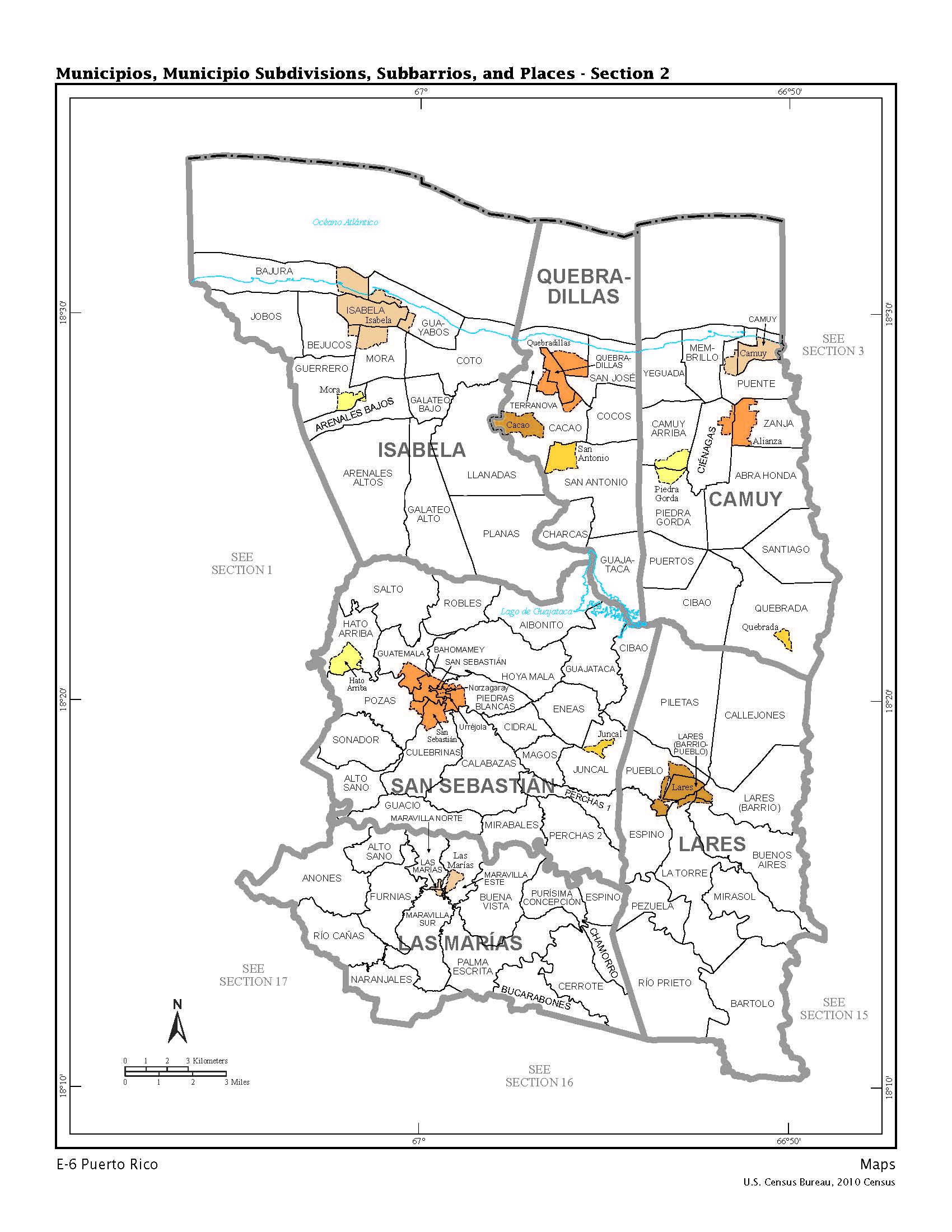
US 2010 census map of Municipios, Municipio Subdivisions, Subbarrios, and Places of Isabela, Quebradillas, Camuy, Lares, Las Marías and San Sebastián showing a place called Hato Arriba in Hato Arriba barrio

- Carretera 111
- Carretera 125
- Carretera 423
- Parcelas Hato Arriba
- Sector Anglada
- Sector Bernal
- Sector Campo Alegre
- Sector Caña Verde
- Sector Cuesta La Luna
- Sector Hoyo Frío
- Sector Hoyo Santo
- Sector Medina
- Sector Nando Rivera
- Sector Paseo Central
- Sector Punta Brava
- Sector Santo Torres
- Urbanización Colinas de Hato Arriba
- Urbanización Lomas Verdes

=== Hoya Mala ===
- Carretera 119
- Carretera 447
- Carretera 448
- Sector Capilla Católica
- Sector Daniel Méndez
- Sector Esteban Cardona
- Sector Gabriel Jiménez
- Sector Jiménez
- Sector Julio Lugo
- Sector La 21
- Sector Las Toscas
- Sector Lechuza
- Sector Mercado
- Sector Monroig
- Sector Pascual Ruiz
- Sector Planta de Gas
- Sector Porto Román
- Sector Sharon

=== Juncal ===
- Carretera 111
- Sector Ballajá
- Sector Iglesia Adventista (Rodríguez)
- Sector Juncal Centro
- Sector Pueblito
- Sector Santiago
- Sector Terraza de Santiago

=== Magos ===
- Carretera 438
- Carretera 451
- Carretera 470
- Sector Ballester
- Sector La Cuadra
- Sector Melito Oliva
- Sector Miguel A. Pérez
- Sector Puente Lajas
- Sector Pujols
- Sector Sonoco
- Sector Toño Jiménez
- Urbanización Santa Teresita

=== Mirabales ===
- Carretera 433
- Sector Israel Hernández
- Sector Los Pérez
- Sector Núñez
- Sector Quebrada Las Cañas

=== Perchas 1 ===
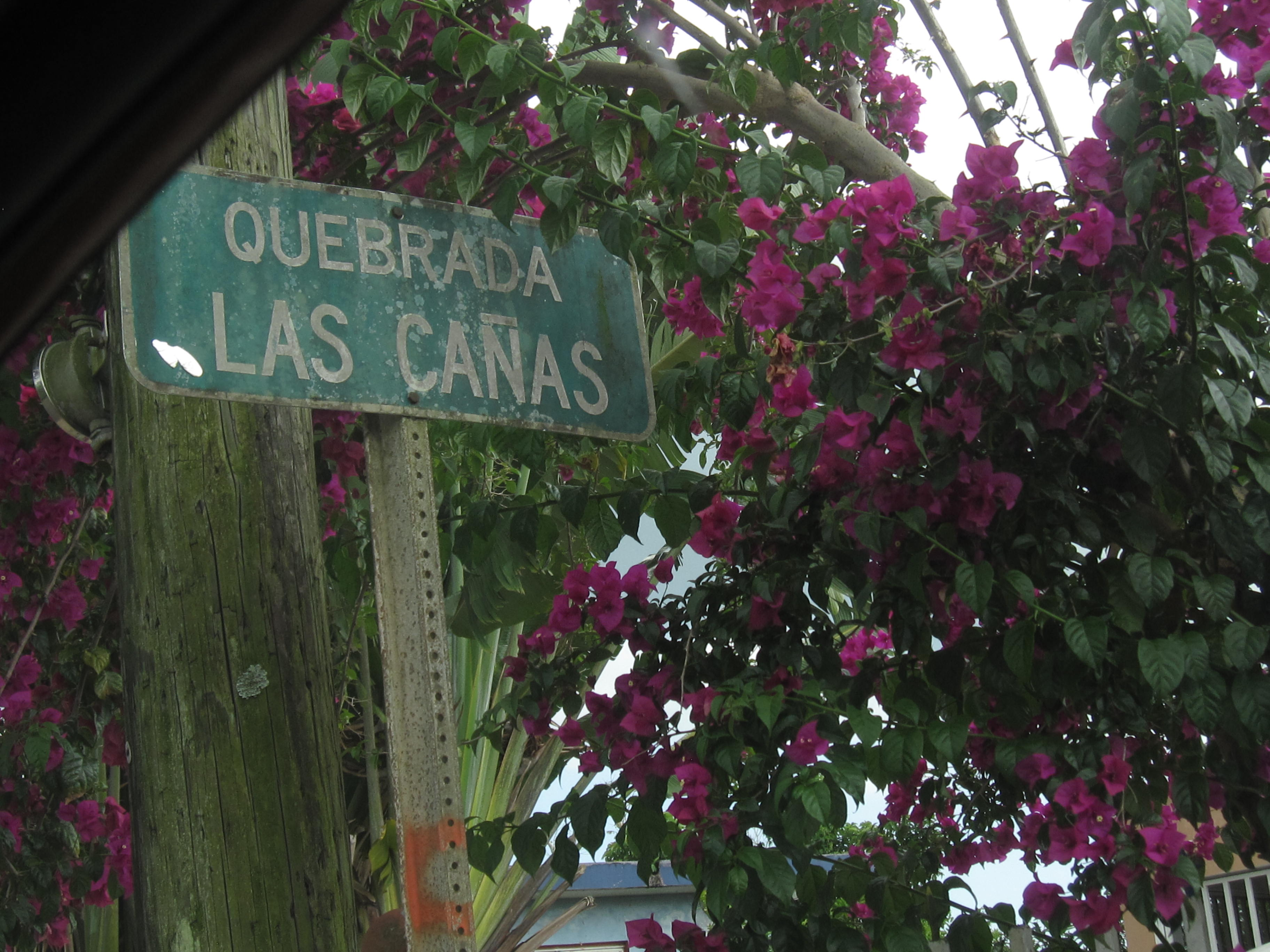
Sign for Sector Quebrada Las Cañas in Perchas 1

- Carretera 435
- Carretera 4435
- Sector Quebrada Las Cañas

=== Perchas 2 ===
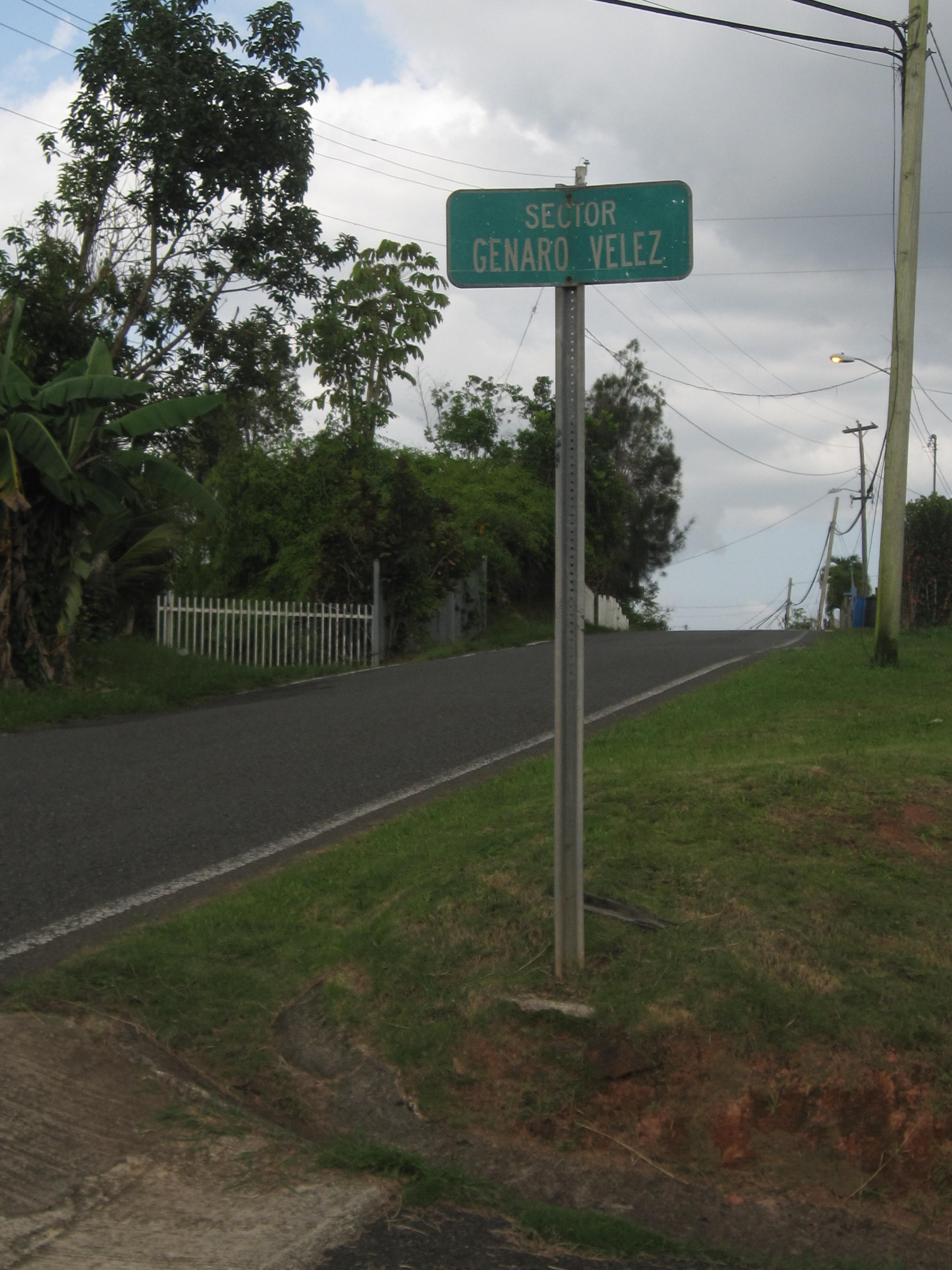
Sign for Sector Genaro Vélez in Perchas 2

- Carretera 124
- Carretera 435
- Comunidad Alturas de Borinquén
- Parcelas García Méndez
- Sector Ángel Ríos
- Sector Entrada Oronoz
- Sector Finca Los Abuelos
- Sector Genaro Vélez
- Sector Lito Rodríguez
- Sector Olavarría
- Sector Pablo Fernández
- Sector Pelo Muerto
- Sector Perfecto Rodríguez
- Sector Parcelas González
- Sector Pulio Rodríguez
- Sector Santo Domingo
- Sector Tosquera

=== Piedras Blancas ===
- Avenida Emérito Estrada Rivera
- Barriada Segarra (Cuchilandia)
- Carretera 111
- Carretera 119
- Carretera 125
- Sector Las Palmas (Escuela Bilingüe)
- Sector Lindín
- Sector Los Pinos
- Sector Tito Ríos
- Urbanización Ubiñas
- Urbanización Valle Verde

=== Pozas ===
- Carretera 109
- Carretera 424
- Carretera 497
- Reparto Feliciano
- Sector Arvelo Rivera
- Sector Colón
- Sector Los Crespo
- Sector Los González
- Sector Los Reyes
- Sector Los Rosado
- Sector Los Traversos
- Sector Méndez
- Sector Ortiz
- Sector Pozas Gardens
- Sector Quintana
- Sector Valle Real

=== Robles ===
- Carretera 446
- Carretera 447
- Carretera 4446
- Sector Cuatro Calles
- Sector El Paraíso
- Sector Farel Velázquez
- Sector Genove González
- Sector La Conquista
- Sector Las Piedras
- Sector Lito Ramos
- Sector Pedro Lisojo
- Sector Peña
- Sector Pochín Serrano
- Sector Ricardo Morales
- Urbanización Antonio Muñiz

=== Salto ===
- Carretera 445
- Sector Agapito Rosado
- Sector Carmelo Serrano
- Sector Cerro Sombrero
- Sector Dómenech
- Sector Felo Ruiz
- Sector Ferdinand Hernández
- Sector Frank Aquino
- Sector La Piedra
- Sector Liono Ramos
- Sector López
- Sector Manuel González
- Sector Minín Vélez
- Sector Morales
- Sector Tamarindo
- Sector Trujillo
- Sector Villa Linda
- Sector Villa Morales

=== San Sebastián barrio-pueblo ===
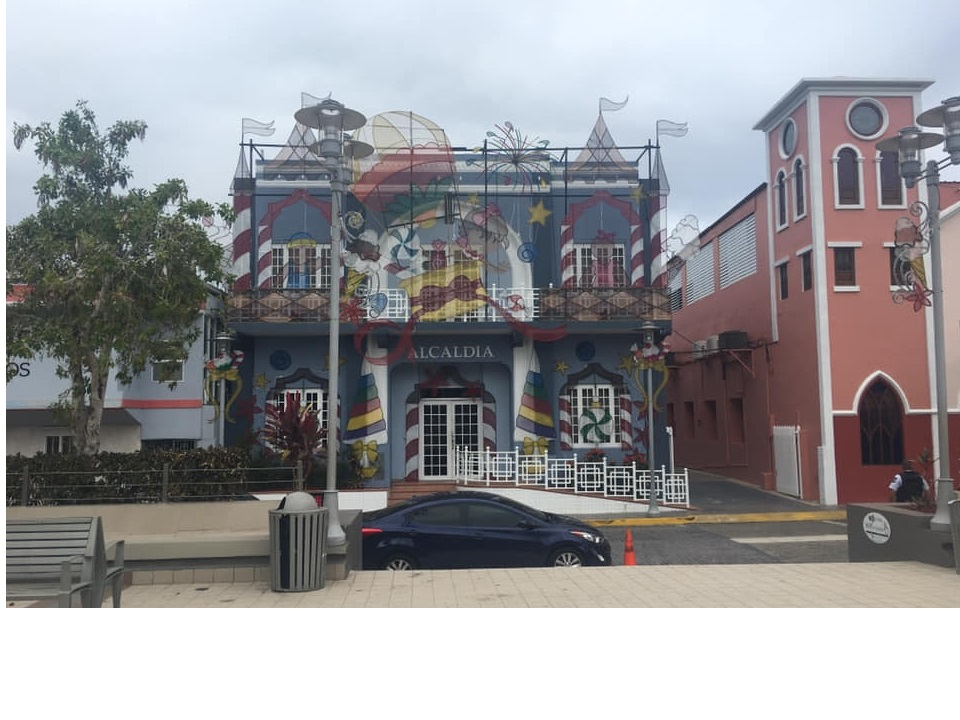
The city hall building in the "Pueblo" of San Sebastián

- Avenida Emérito Estrada Rivera
- Calle Andrés M. Liciaga
- Calle Andrés Velázquez
- Calle Ángel Mislán
- Calle Betances
- Calle Emilio Ruiz
- Calle Hipólito Castro
- Calle Hostos
- Calle Jesús T Piñero
- Calle J. Méndez Cardona
- Calle M. J. Cabrero
- Calle Muñoz Rivera
- Calle Padre Feliciano
- Calle Pavía Fernández
- Calle Raúl Gaya Benejam
- Calle Ruiz Belvis
- Calle Severo Arana
- Calle 25 de Julio
- Norzagaray subbarrio
- Residencial San Sebastián Court
- Residencial Villa Soigal
- Sector Paralelo 38
- Sector Rabo del Buey
- Urbanización Guayabal
- Urbanización Los Alamos
- Urbanización Pedro T. Labayen
- Urbanización Román
- Urréjola subbarrio

=== Sonador ===
- Carretera 423
- Carretera 497
- Parcelas Sonador
- Sector Álvarez
- Sector Andrés Torres
- Sector Berto Vargas
- Sector Cruz Montalvo
- Sector El Callejón
- Sector El Túnel
- Sector Entrada Chaín
- Sector Gelo Ramos
- Sector José Manuel Soto
- Sector Julio Nieves
- Sector Justo Pérez
- Sector La Parada
- Sector La Pluma Pública
- Sector La Vanguardia
- Sector Manolo Quiles
- Sector Maximino Soto
- Sector Montalvo
- Sector Ortiz
- Sector Pello Sánchez
- Sector Puente Nuevo
- Sector Siso Quiles
- Sector Tito Bondo
- Urbanización Brisas del Río Sonador

== See also ==
- List of communities in Puerto Rico
