= Puerto Rico Highway 125 =

Highway in Puerto Rico

Highway 125
- Ruta 125

Route information
- Maintained by Puerto Rico DTPW
- Length: 21.1 km (13.1 mi)

Major junctions
- West end: PR-111 in Palmar
- PR-110 in Pueblo–Moca barrio-pueblo; PR-444 in Voladoras; PR-404 in Voladoras; PR-420 in Voladoras; PR-112 in Capá; PR-423 in Hato Arriba; PR-445 in Guatemala; PR-446 in Guatemala; PR-109 in Bahomamey; PR-119 in Bahomamey–Piedras Blancas
- East end: PR-111 in Piedras Blancas

Location
- Country: United States
- Territory: Puerto Rico
- Municipalities: Aguadilla, Moca, San Sebastián

Highway system
- Roads in Puerto Rico; List
← PR-124	→ PR-127
← PR-116R	PR-125R	→ PR-139R

Puerto Rico Highway 125 (PR-125) is a road that travels from Aguadilla, Puerto Rico to San Sebastián, passing through Moca. This highway begins at PR-111 in Palmar and ends at the same highway in Piedras Blancas.

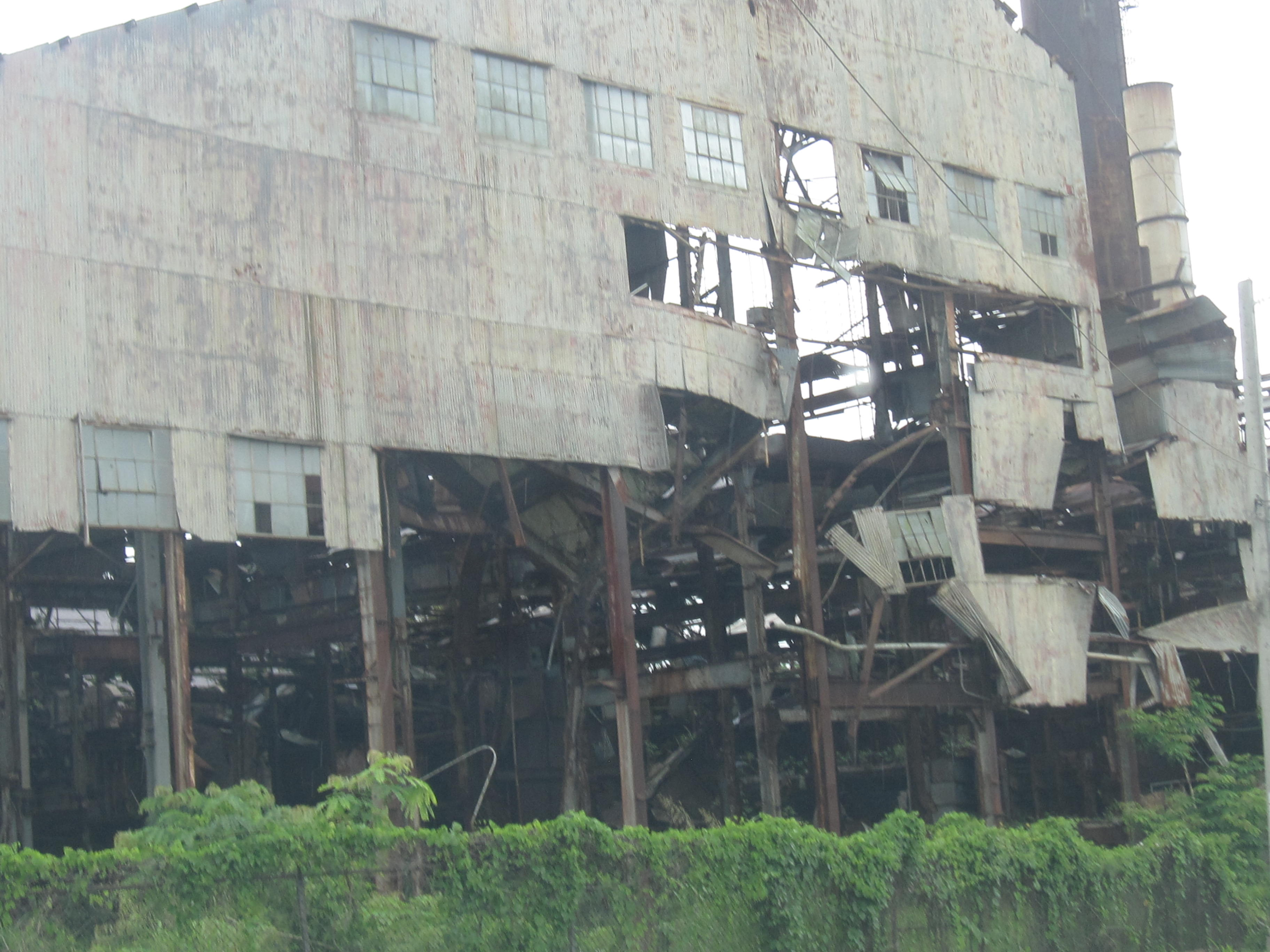
Ruins of the Antigua Central La Plata, on PR-125 in barrio Guatemala

== Major intersections ==
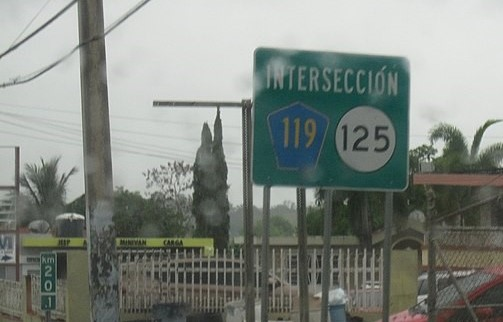
Sign for intersection of Puerto Rico Highways 119 and 125 in San Sebastián

Municipality	Location	km	mi	Destinations	Notes
Aguadilla	Palmar	0.0	0.0	PR-111 (Carretera Enrique Laguerre) – Aguadilla, Moca	Western terminus of PR-125
Moca	Pueblo	1.2	0.75	PR-111 (Carretera Enrique Laguerre) – Aguadilla, San Sebastián	
Moca	Moca barrio-pueblo	2.3	1.4	PR-4025 (Calle Blanca E. Chico) – Moca	Former PR-110R
Moca	Pueblo–Moca barrio-pueblo line	2.8	1.7	PR-110 (Calle Concepción Vera Ayala) – Isabela, Añasco	
Moca	Pueblo–Moca barrio-pueblo line	3.2	2.0	PR-444 (Carretera Quique Vale Avilés) – Cuchillas	
Moca	Voladoras	4.7	2.9	PR-404 – Cruz	
Moca	Voladoras	6.1	3.8	PR-111 (Carretera Enrique Laguerre) – Aguadilla, San Sebastián	
Moca	Voladoras	7.4	4.6	PR-434 – Rocha	
Moca	Voladoras	8.1	5.0	PR-420 (Carretera Víctor Raúl Hernández Nieves) – Plata	
Moca	Capá	11.1	6.9	PR-421 – Capá	
Moca	Capá	11.6	7.2	PR-112 (Carretera Luis A. "Toñito" Pérez) – Isabela	
Moca	Capá	11.9	7.4	PR-422 – Capá	
San Sebastián	Hato Arriba	13.7	8.5	PR-423 – Hato Arriba	
San Sebastián	Hato Arriba–Guatemala line	15.2	9.4	PR-111 (Carretera Enrique Laguerre) – Moca, Lares	
San Sebastián	Guatemala	17.1	10.6	PR-445 – Salto	
San Sebastián	Guatemala	17.9	11.1	PR-446 (Avenida Ricardo Serrano) – Quebradillas	
San Sebastián	Bahomamey	18.4	11.4	PR-125 Spur (Calle Pavía Fernández) – San Sebastián	
San Sebastián	Bahomamey	19.0	11.8	PR-109 (Calle Segundo Ruiz Belvis) – San Sebastián, Añasco	
San Sebastián	Bahomamey–Piedras Blancas line	19.7	12.2	PR-119 north (Calle Eugenio María de Hostos) – San Sebastián	Western terminus of PR-119 concurrency; one-way street; northbound access via Calle Severo Arana
San Sebastián	Piedras Blancas	19.9	12.4	PR-119 south – Las Marías	Eastern terminus of PR-119 concurrency
San Sebastián	Piedras Blancas	21.1	13.1	PR-111 (Carretera Enrique Laguerre) – Moca, Lares	Eastern terminus of PR-125
1.000 mi = 1.609 km; 1.000 km = 0.621 mi: Concurrency terminus; Incomplete access

== Related route ==
Highway 125 Spur
- Location: San Sebastián
- Length: 0.95 km (0.59 mi; 3,100 ft)

Highway 125 Spur (Spanish: Carretera Ramal 125, abbreviated Ramal PR-125 or PR-125R) is a road that branches off from PR-125 to PR-109 in downtown San Sebastián. The entire route is located in San Sebastián.

Location	km	mi	Destinations	Notes
Bahomamey	0.00	0.00	PR-125 (Avenida Emérito Estrada Rivera) – Moca	Western terminus of PR-125R
San Sebastián barrio-pueblo	0.95	0.59	PR-109 (Calle Segundo Ruiz Belvis) – San Sebastián	Eastern terminus of PR-125R; one-way street; westbound access via Calle Luis Muñoz Rivera (to Añasco)
1.000 mi = 1.609 km; 1.000 km = 0.621 mi
