= Guatemala River =

River of Puerto Rico

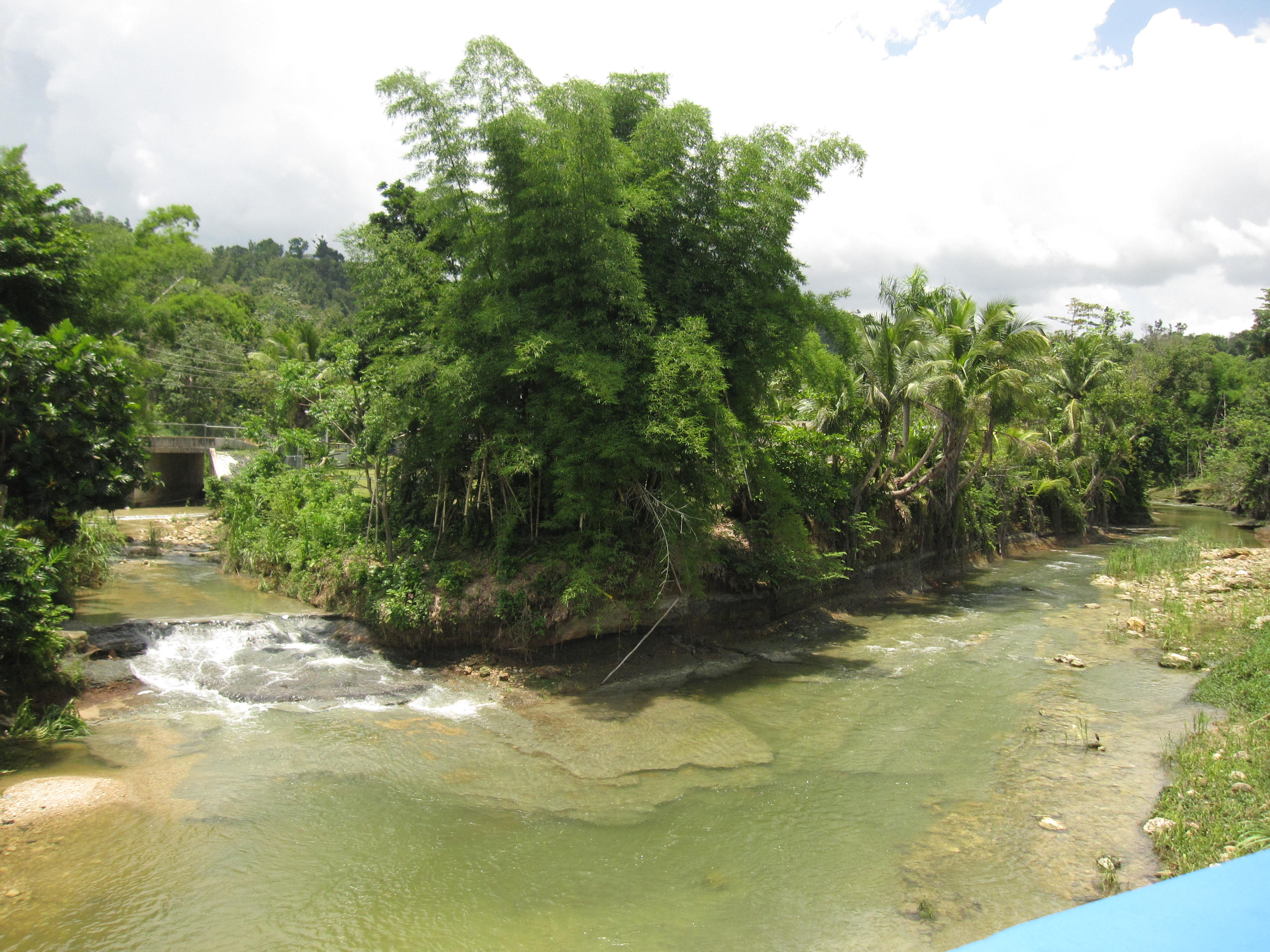
- Río Guatemala in San Sebastián, Puerto Rico
- Native name: Río Guatemala (Spanish)

Location
- Commonwealth: Puerto Rico
- Municipality: San Sebastián
- Barrio: Guatemala

Physical characteristics
- Source
  - coordinates: 18.3363387°N 67.0046229°W

The Guatemala River (Río Guatemala) is a river of San Sebastián, Puerto Rico.

== Gallery ==
River as seen from the bridge in Guatemala barrio:

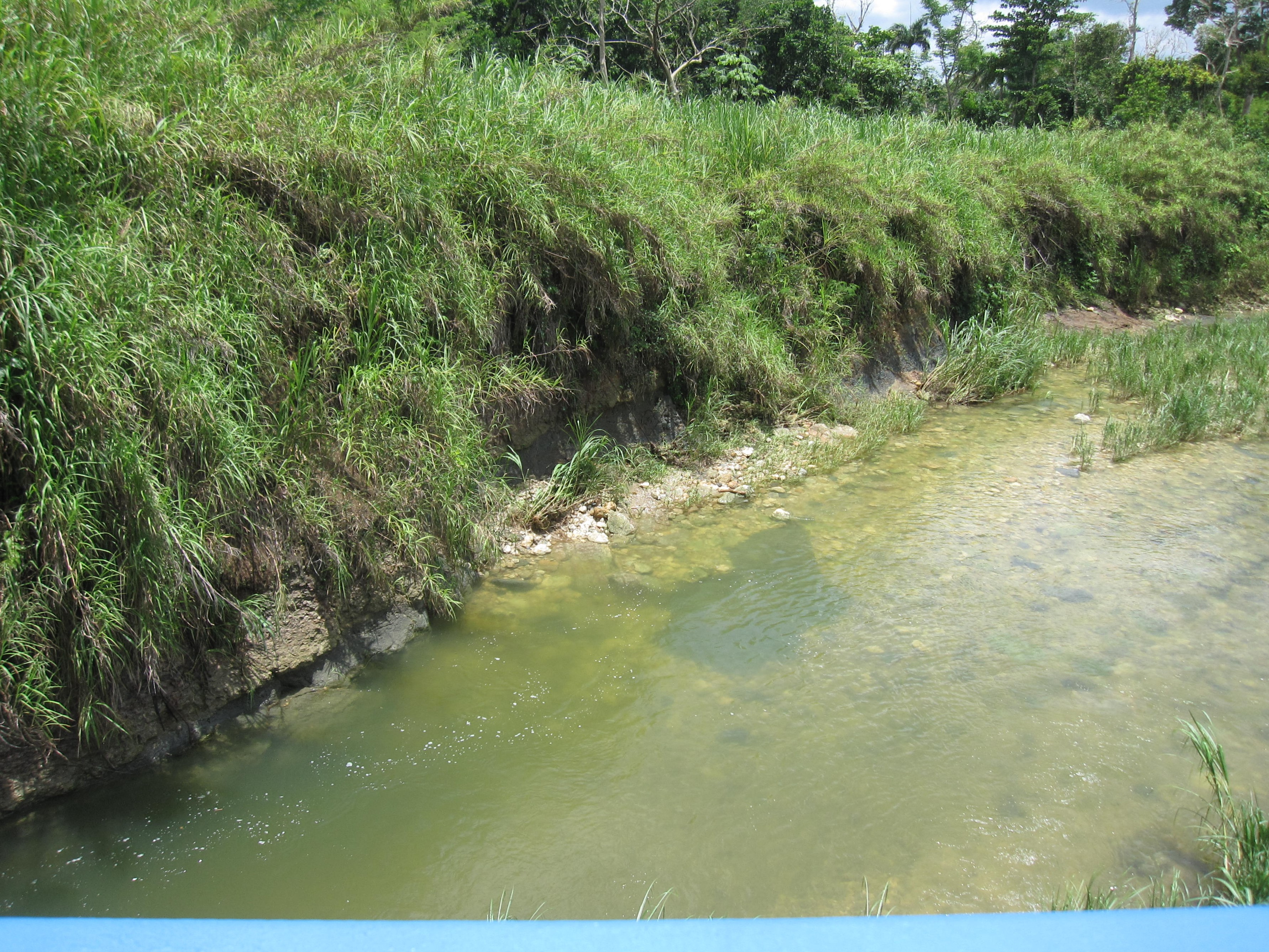

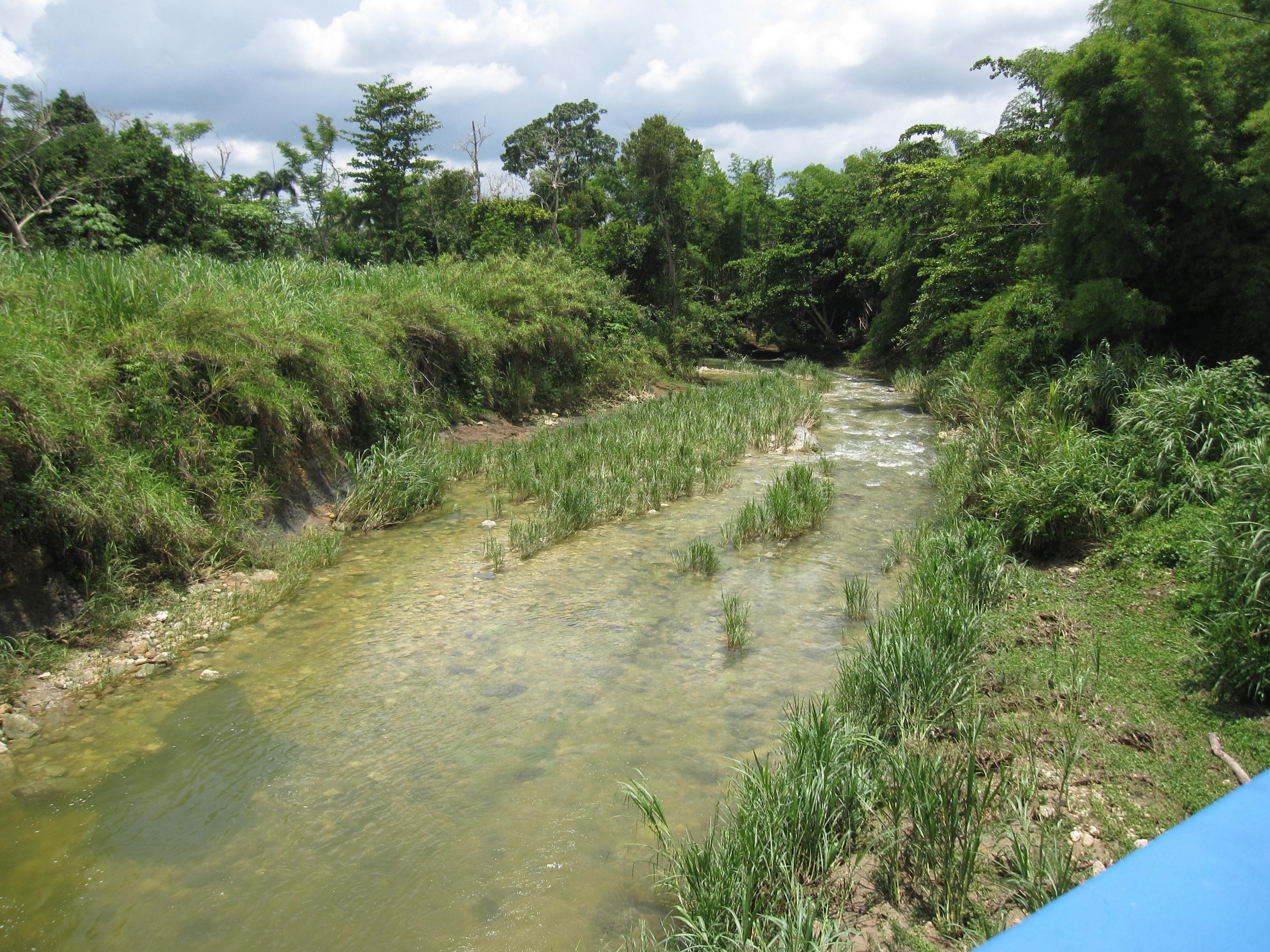

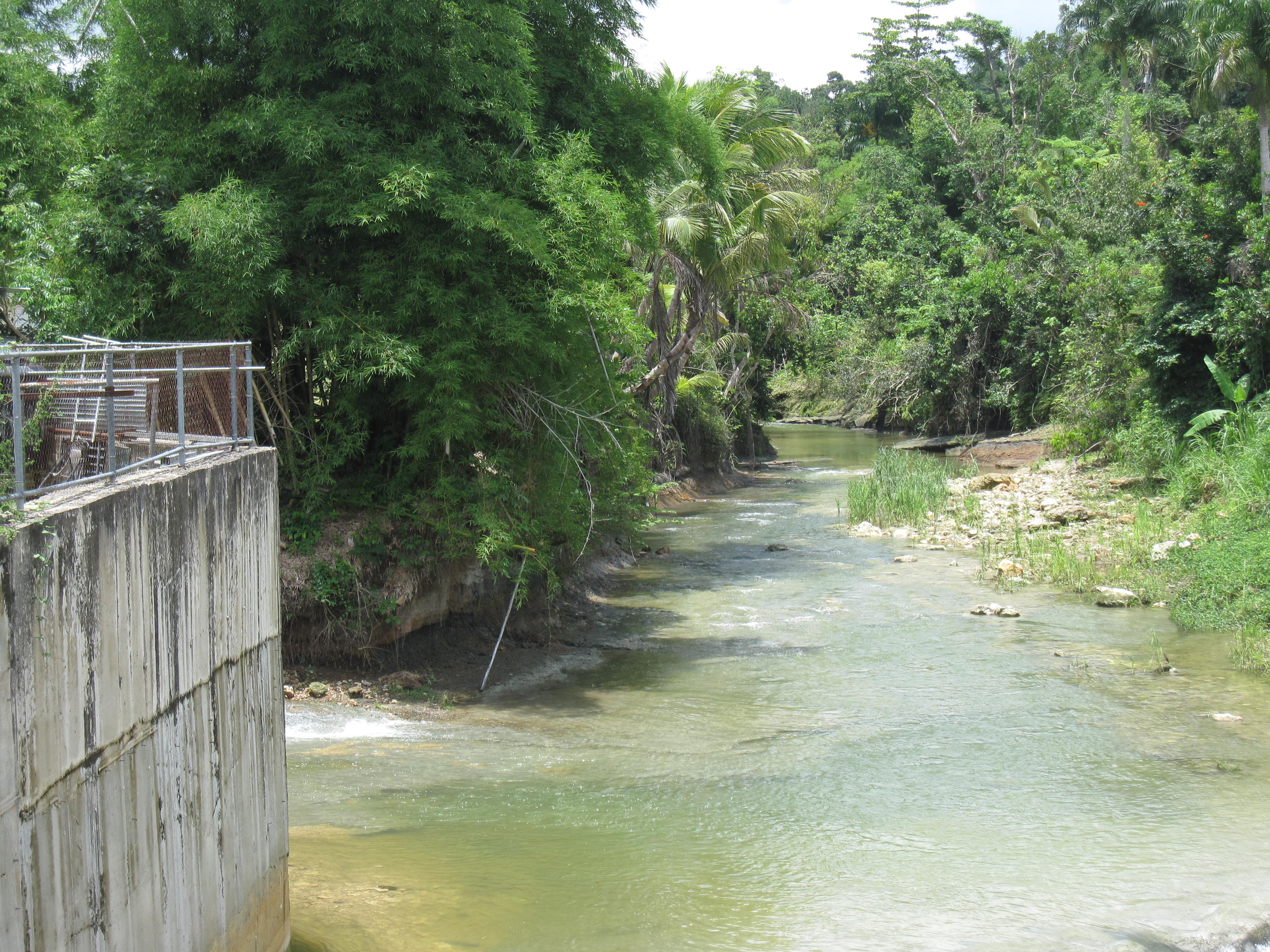

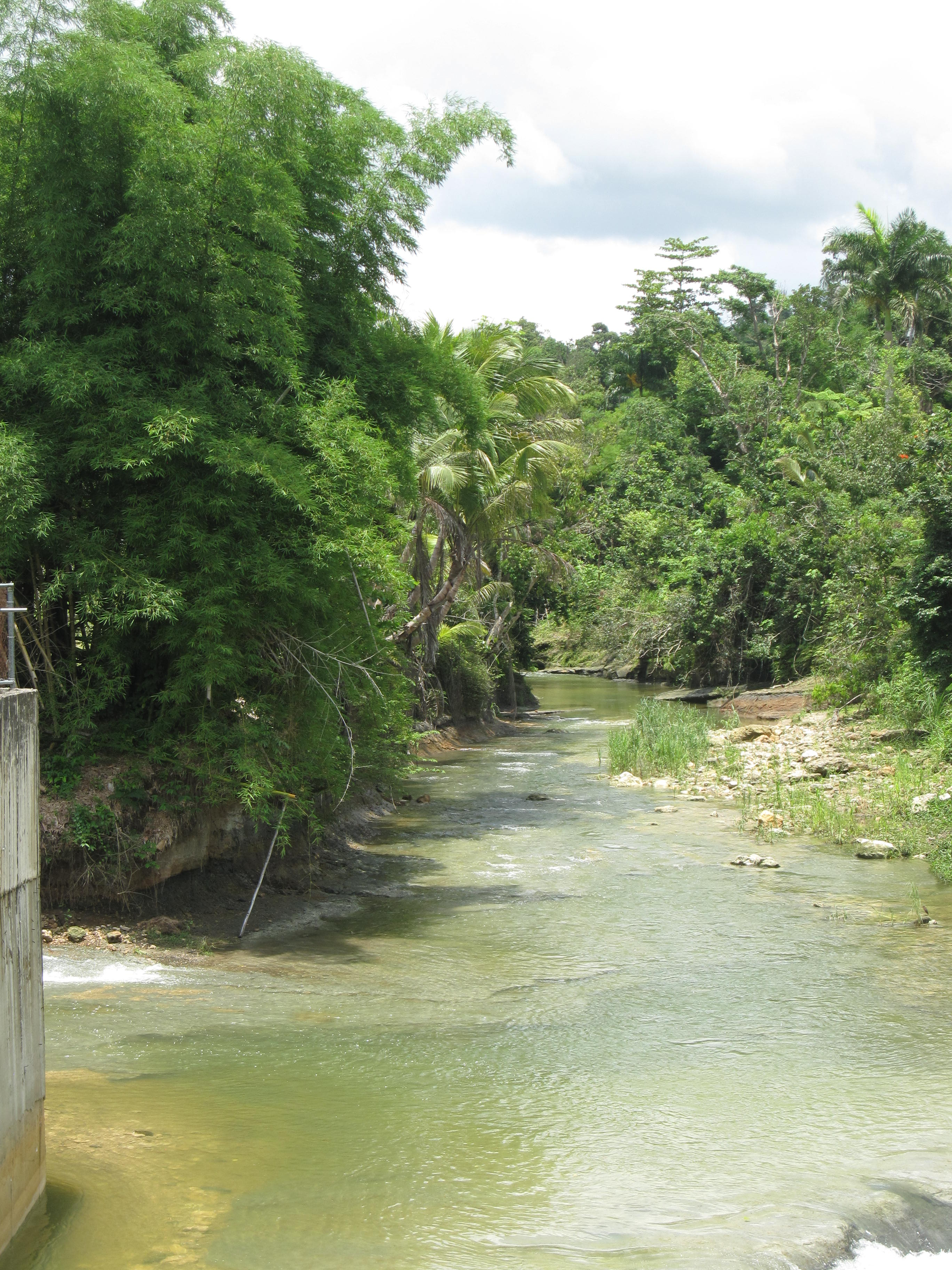

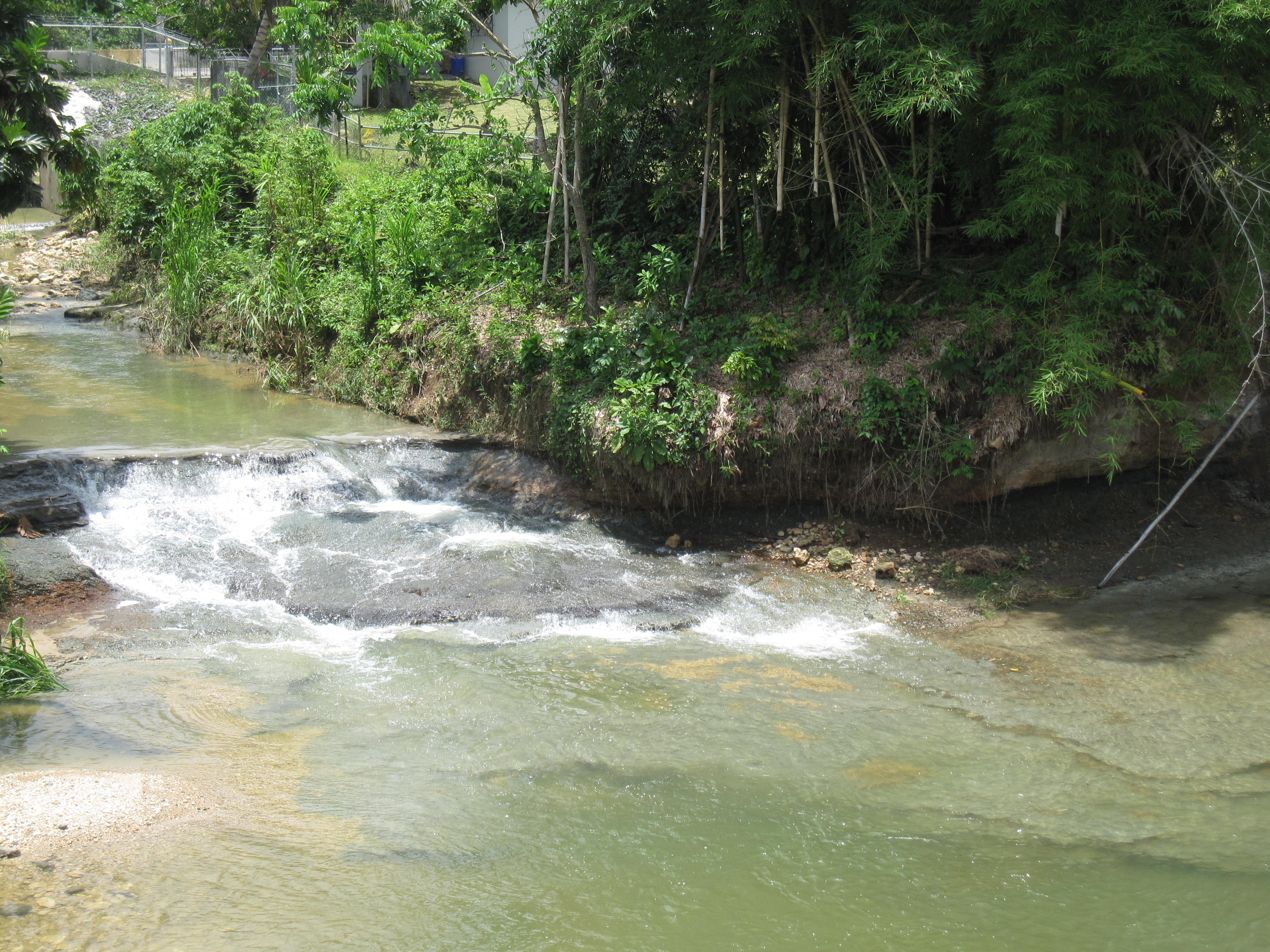

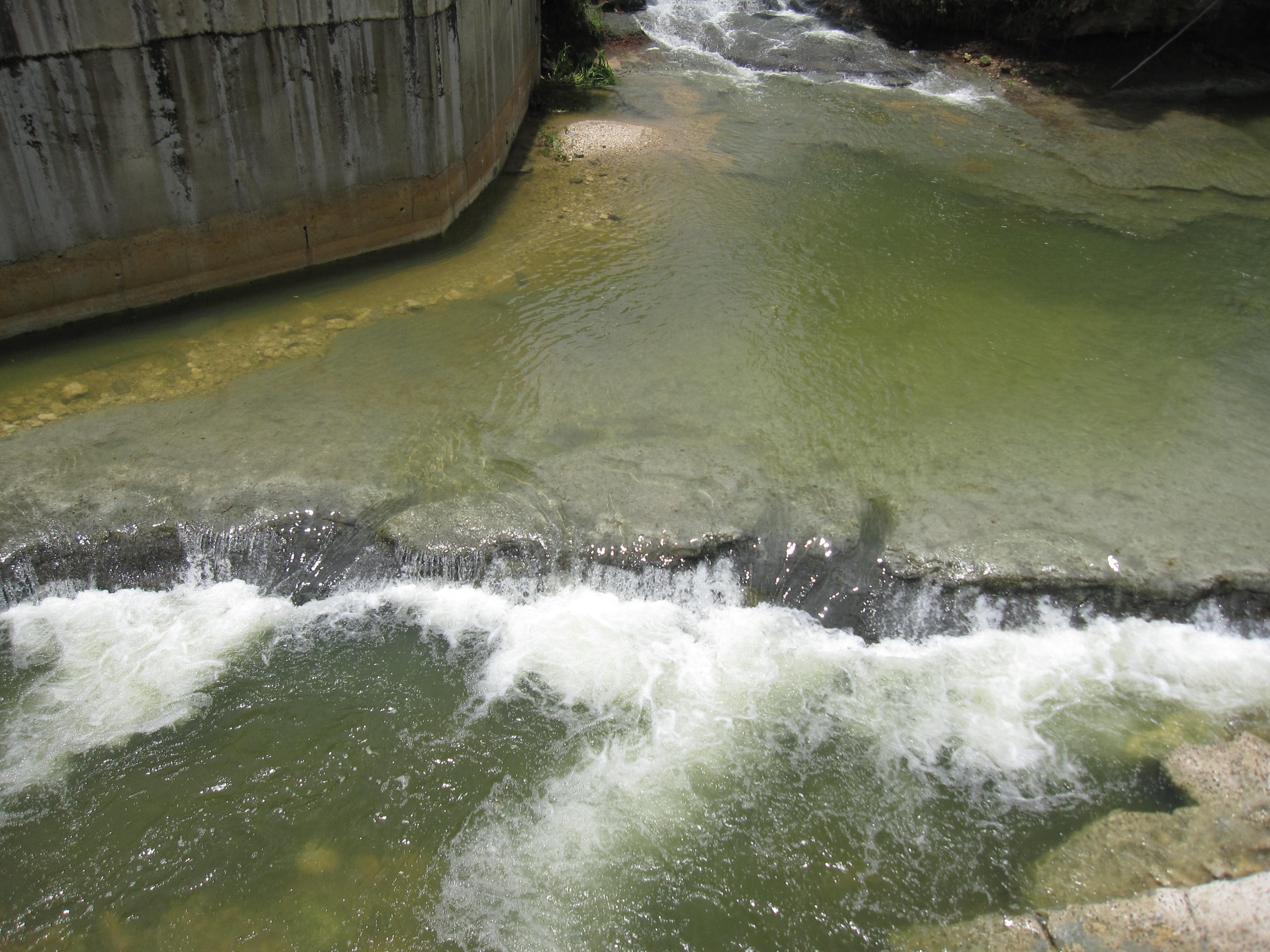

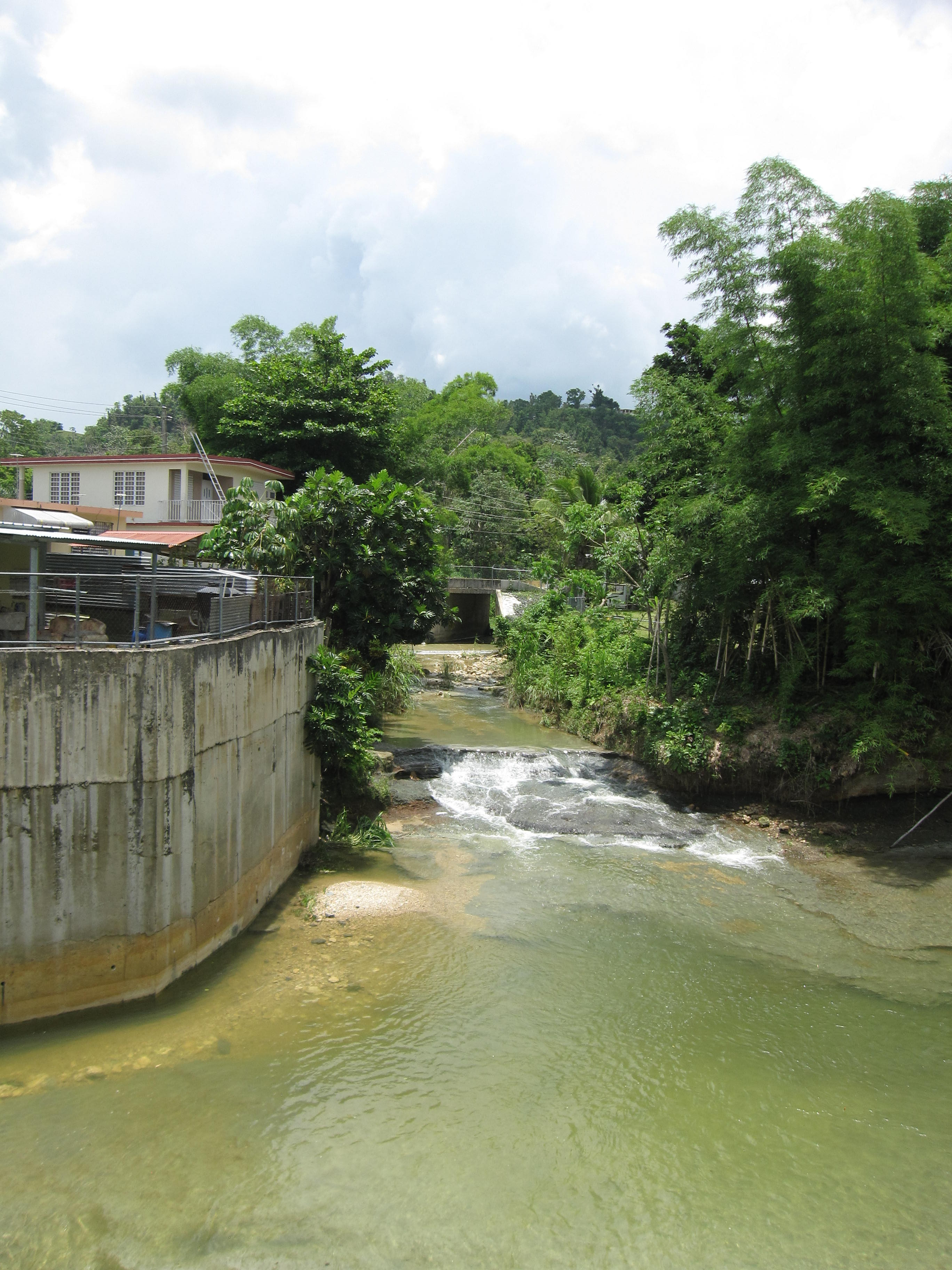

== See also ==
- List of rivers of Puerto Rico
