= Salto, San Sebastián, Puerto Rico =

Barrio of Puerto Rico

Salto Saltos
- Barrio
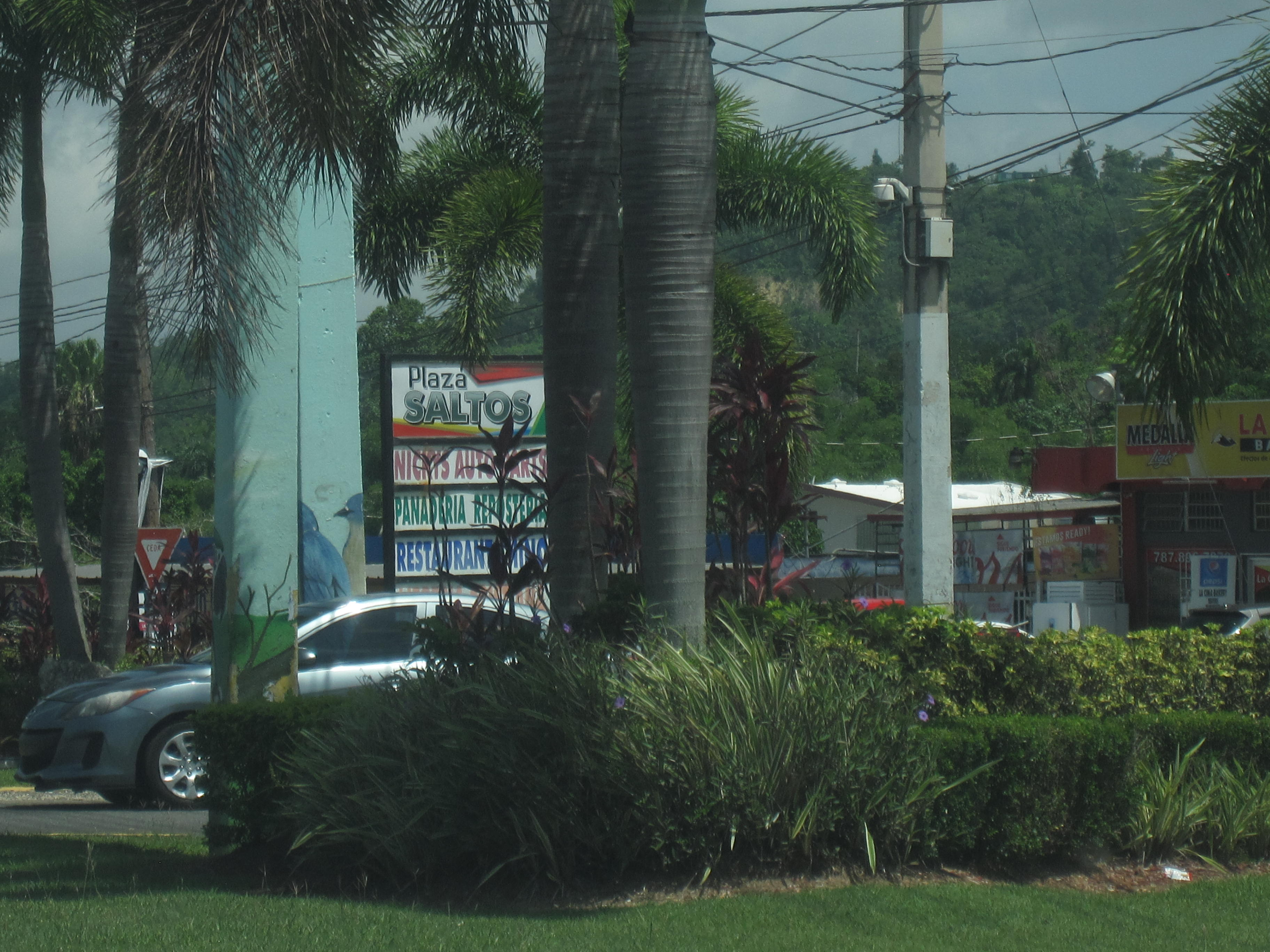
- Plaza Saltos in Saltos barrio in San Sebastián

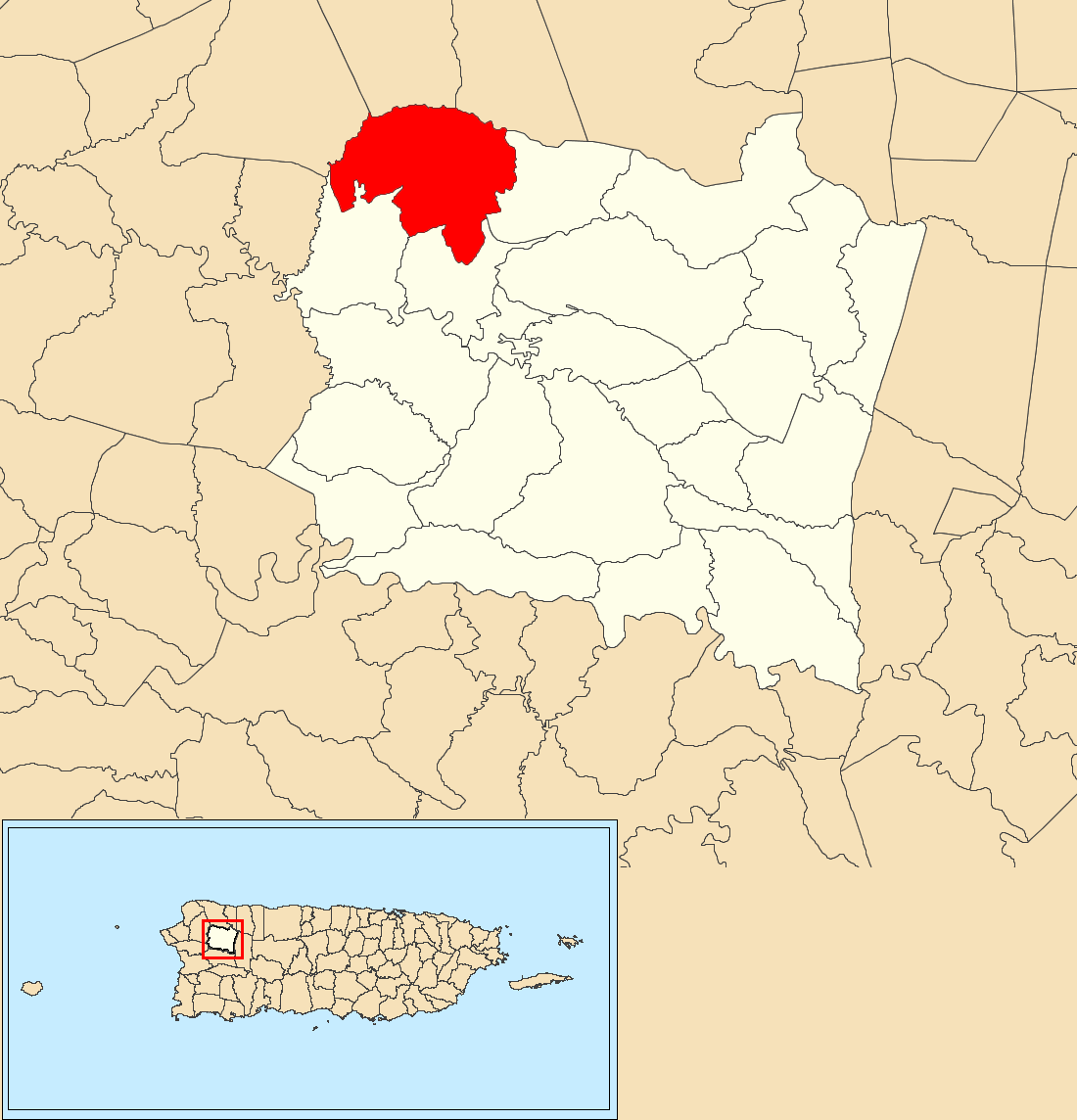
- Location of Salto within the municipality of San Sebastián shown in red

- Location of Puerto Rico
- Coordinates: 18°22′44″N 67°00′44″W
- Commonwealth: Puerto Rico
- Municipality: San Sebastián

Area
  - Total: 4.76 sq mi (12.3 km^{2})
  - Land: 4.76 sq mi (12.3 km^{2})
  - Water: 0 sq mi (0 km^{2})
- Elevation: 348 ft (106 m)

Population (2010)
  - Total: 3,069
  - Density: 644.7/sq mi (248.9/km^{2})
- Source: 2010 Census
- Time zone: UTC−4 (AST)

Salto (also known as Saltos) is a barrio in the municipality of San Sebastián, Puerto Rico. Its population in 2010 was 3,069.

== Sectors ==
Barrios (which are, in contemporary times, roughly comparable to minor civil divisions) in turn are further subdivided into smaller local populated place areas/units called sectores (sectors in English). The types of sectores may vary, from normally sector to urbanización to reparto to barriada to residencial, among others.

The following sectors are in Salto barrio:

Carretera 445, Sector Agapito Rosado, Sector Carmelo Serrano, Sector Cerro Sombrero, Sector Dómenech, Sector Felo Ruiz, Sector Ferdinand Hernández, Sector Frank Aquino, Sector La Piedra, Sector Liono Ramos, Sector López, Sector Manuel González, Sector Minín Vélez, Sector Morales, Sector Tamarindo, Sector Trujillo, Sector Villa Linda, and Sector Villa Morales.

== History ==
Salto was in Spain's gazetteers until Puerto Rico was ceded by Spain in the aftermath of the Spanish–American War under the terms of the Treaty of Paris of 1898 and became an unincorporated territory of the United States. In 1899, the United States Department of War conducted a census of Puerto Rico finding that the combined population of Robles and Salto barrios was 1,646.

Historical population
| Census | Pop. | Note | %± |
|---|---|---|---|
| 1910 | 1,156 | | — |
| 1920 | 1,570 | | 35.8% |
| 1930 | 2,045 | | 30.3% |
| 1940 | 2,153 | | 5.3% |
| 1950 | 2,260 | | 5.0% |
| 1960 | 1,925 | | −14.8% |
| 1970 | 1,799 | | −6.5% |
| 1980 | 2,212 | | 23.0% |
| 1990 | 2,411 | | 9.0% |
| 2000 | 2,887 | | 19.7% |
| 2010 | 3,069 | | 6.3% |
U.S. Decennial Census; 1900 (N/A) 1910-1930; 1930-1950 1980-2000 2010

== Río Culebrinas flooding ==
In late May 2019, Saltos and many other areas in various municipalities suffered flooding, felled trees, landslides and closed highways when Río Culebrinas flooded.

== See also ==
- List of communities in Puerto Rico
- List of barrios and sectors of San Sebastián, Puerto Rico
