= Guatemala, San Sebastián, Puerto Rico =

Barrio of Puerto Rico

Guatemala
- Barrio
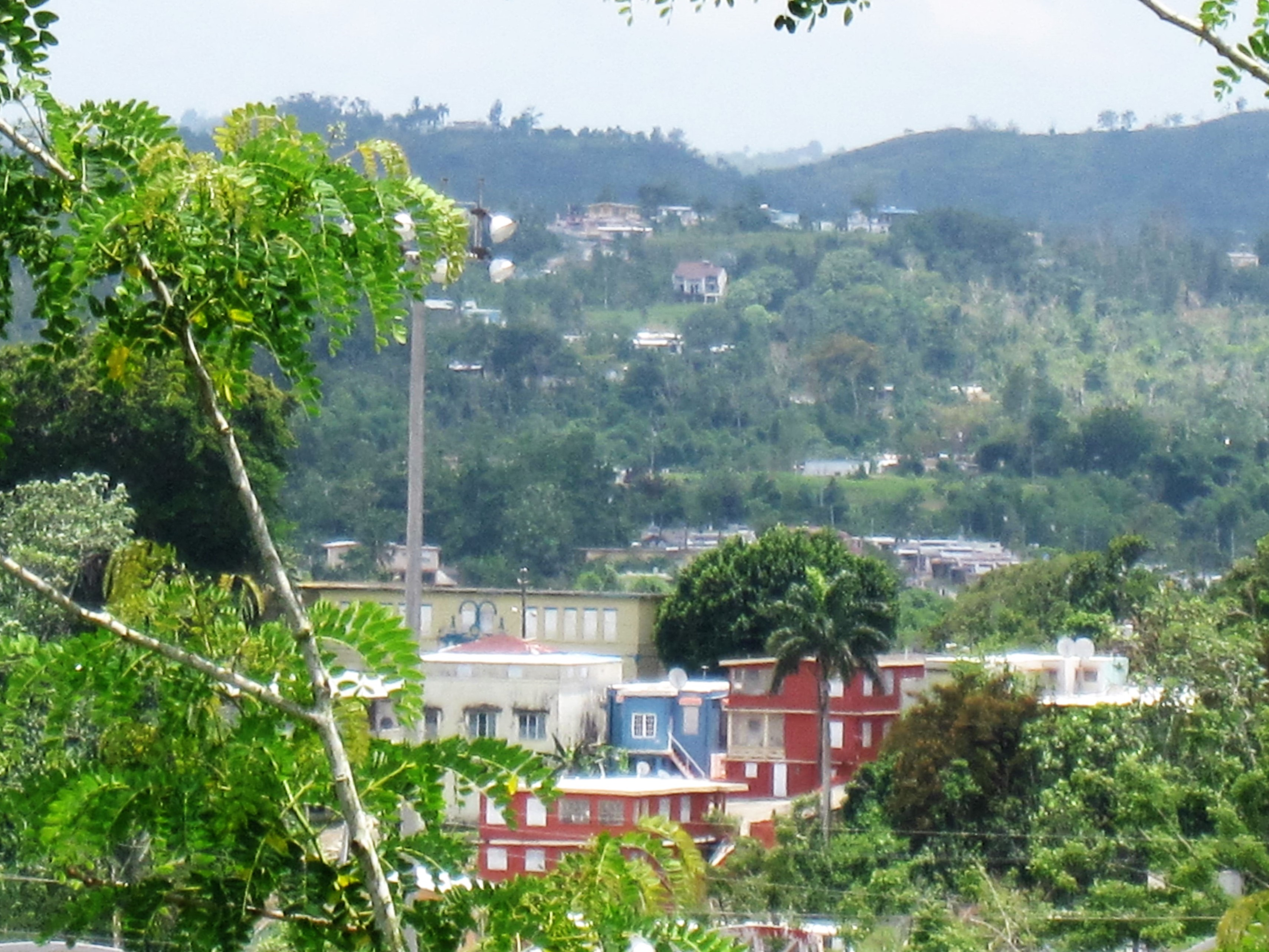
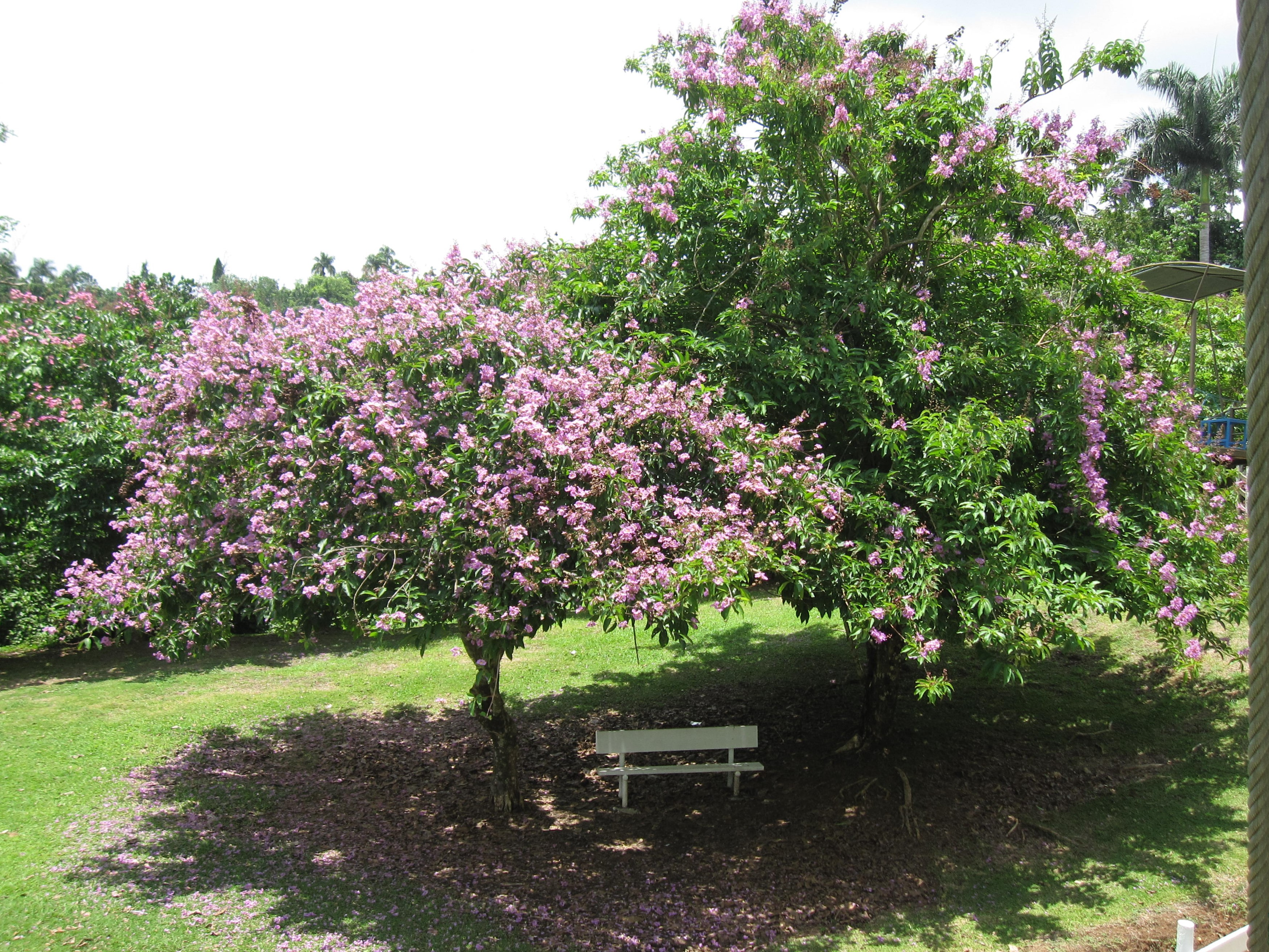
- Clockwise from top: Panorama of Guatemala, Trees at Veredas Sports Complex

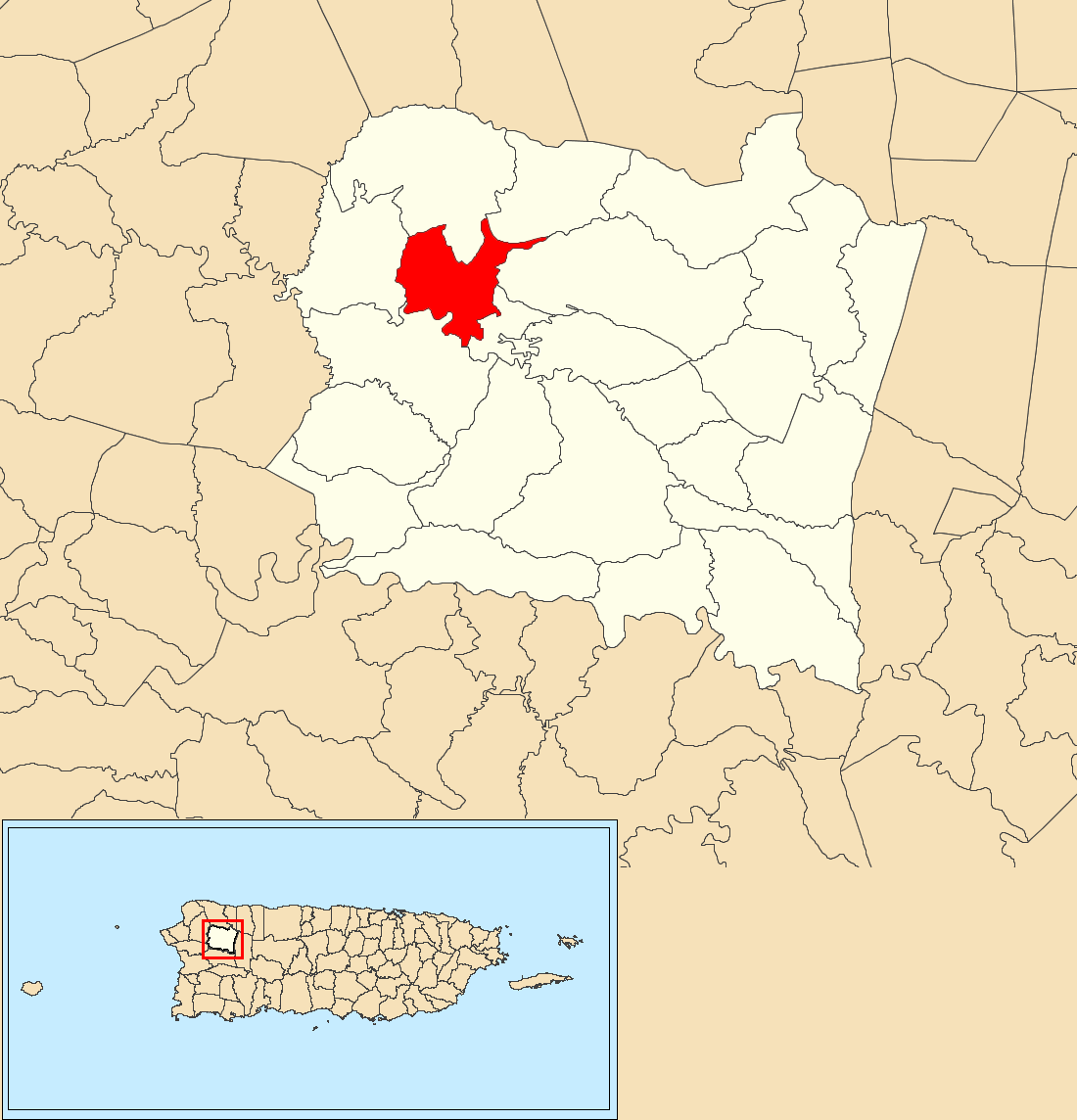
- Location of Guatemala within the municipality of San Sebastián shown in red

- Location of Puerto Rico
- Coordinates: 18°21′10″N 67°00′24″W
- Commonwealth: Puerto Rico
- Municipality: San Sebastián

Area
  - Total: 2.16 sq mi (5.6 km^{2})
  - Land: 2.16 sq mi (5.6 km^{2})
  - Water: 0 sq mi (0 km^{2})
- Elevation: 223 ft (68 m)

Population (2010)
  - Total: 2,512
  - Density: 1,163/sq mi (449/km^{2})
- Source: 2010 Census
- Time zone: UTC−4 (AST)

Guatemala is a barrio in the municipality of San Sebastián, Puerto Rico. Its population in 2010 was 2,512.

The Guatemala River is located in Guatemala barrio.

== History ==
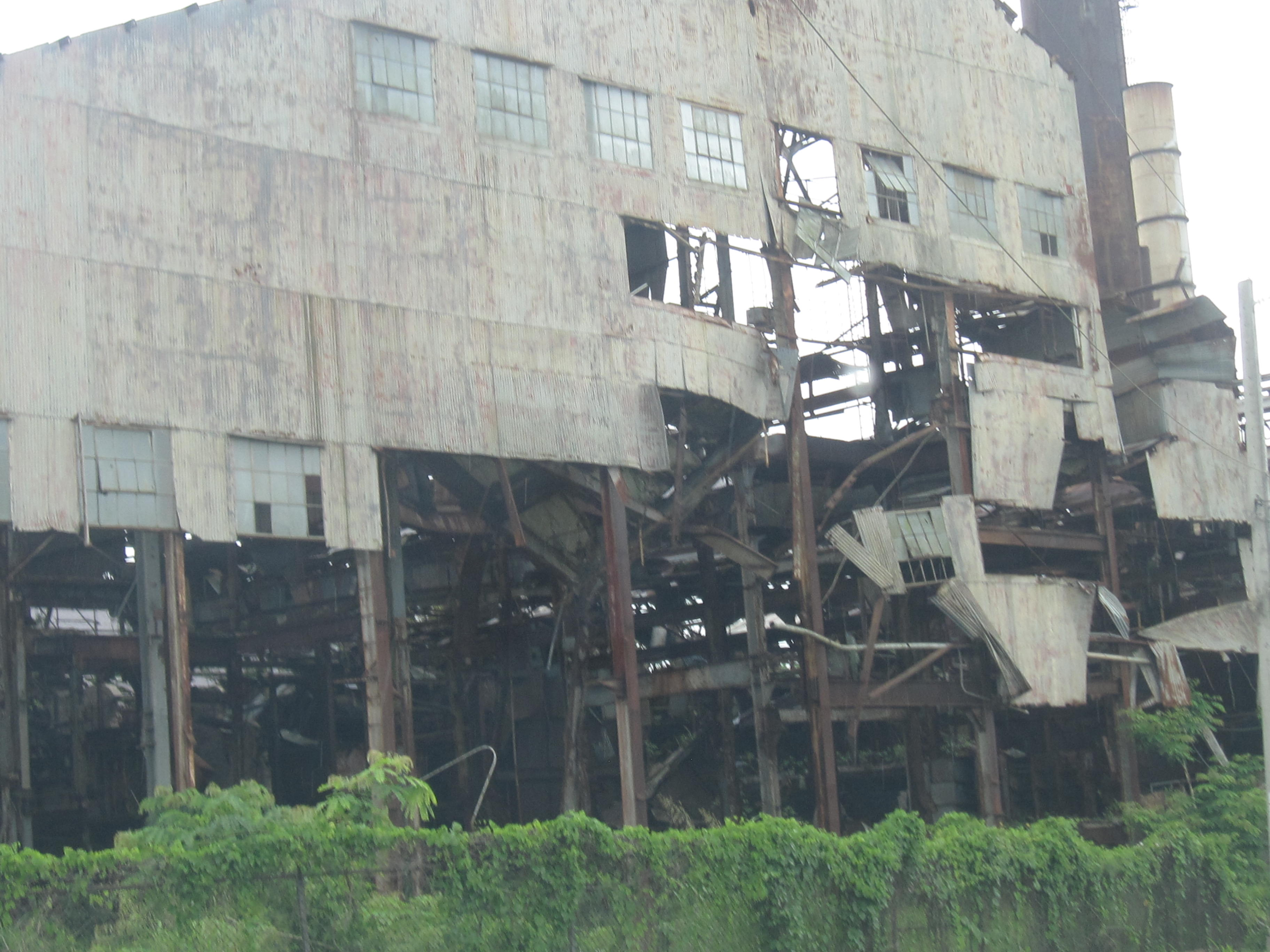
What remains of the Antigua Central La Plata sugar refinery on PR-125 in Guatemala

Guatemala was in Spain's gazetteers until Puerto Rico was ceded by Spain in the aftermath of the Spanish–American War under the terms of the Treaty of Paris of 1898 and became an unincorporated territory of the United States. In 1899, the United States Department of War conducted a census of Puerto Rico finding that the population of Guatemala barrio and Bahomamey barrio was 1,126.

A large sugar refinery operated in Guatemala until it went into disuse.

Historical population
Census	Pop.	Note	%±
1910	610		—
1920	842		38.0%
1930	1,226		45.6%
1940	1,737		41.7%
1950	2,182		25.6%
1960	2,126		−2.6%
1970	1,925		−9.5%
1980	2,544		32.2%
1990	3,030		19.1%
2000	2,919		−3.7%
2010	2,512		−13.9%
U.S. Decennial Census; 1899 (shown as 1900) 1910-1930; 1930-1950 1980-2000 2010

== Sectors ==
Barrios (which are, in contemporary times, roughly comparable to minor civil divisions) in turn are further subdivided into smaller local populated place areas/units called sectores (sectors in English). The types of sectores may vary, from normally sector to urbanización to reparto to barriada to residencial, among others.

The following sectors are in Guatemala barrio:

Avenida Emérito Estrada Rivera, Carretera 111, Carretera 125, Carretera 445, Carretera 446, Sector Barandillo, Sector Bejuco, Sector Central Plata, Sector Colón, Sector Goyin Rámirez, Sector Javilla, Sector Laberinto, Sector La Vega, Sector Marcelo Pérez, Sector Méndez, Sector Peña, Sector Rincón (Gozalandia), Sector Salsipuedes, Sector Torres, Urbanización Extensión Villa Rita, Urbanización Jardines de Guatemala, Urbanización Mansiones de Loma Linda, Urbanización San Antonio de La Plata, Urbanización San Carmelo de la Plata, and Urbanización Villa Rita.

== Features ==
The Guatemala River passes through Guatemala in San Sebastián. There is a sports complex featuring a museum of an hacienda. San Sebastián Memorial is located in Guatemala.

=== Veredas Sports Complex ===
Established in 2016 in Guatemala is the Veredas Sports Complex. The complex which consists of a modern skate park, a sand volleyball court, a zipline with four stations, a climbing and rappelling wall, an outdoor gym, a rope bridge, basketball and tennis courts, and walking paths, is set within an urban forest of about six thousand trees. Hacienda La Fe, an agriculture museum is located at the complex.

== Gallery ==
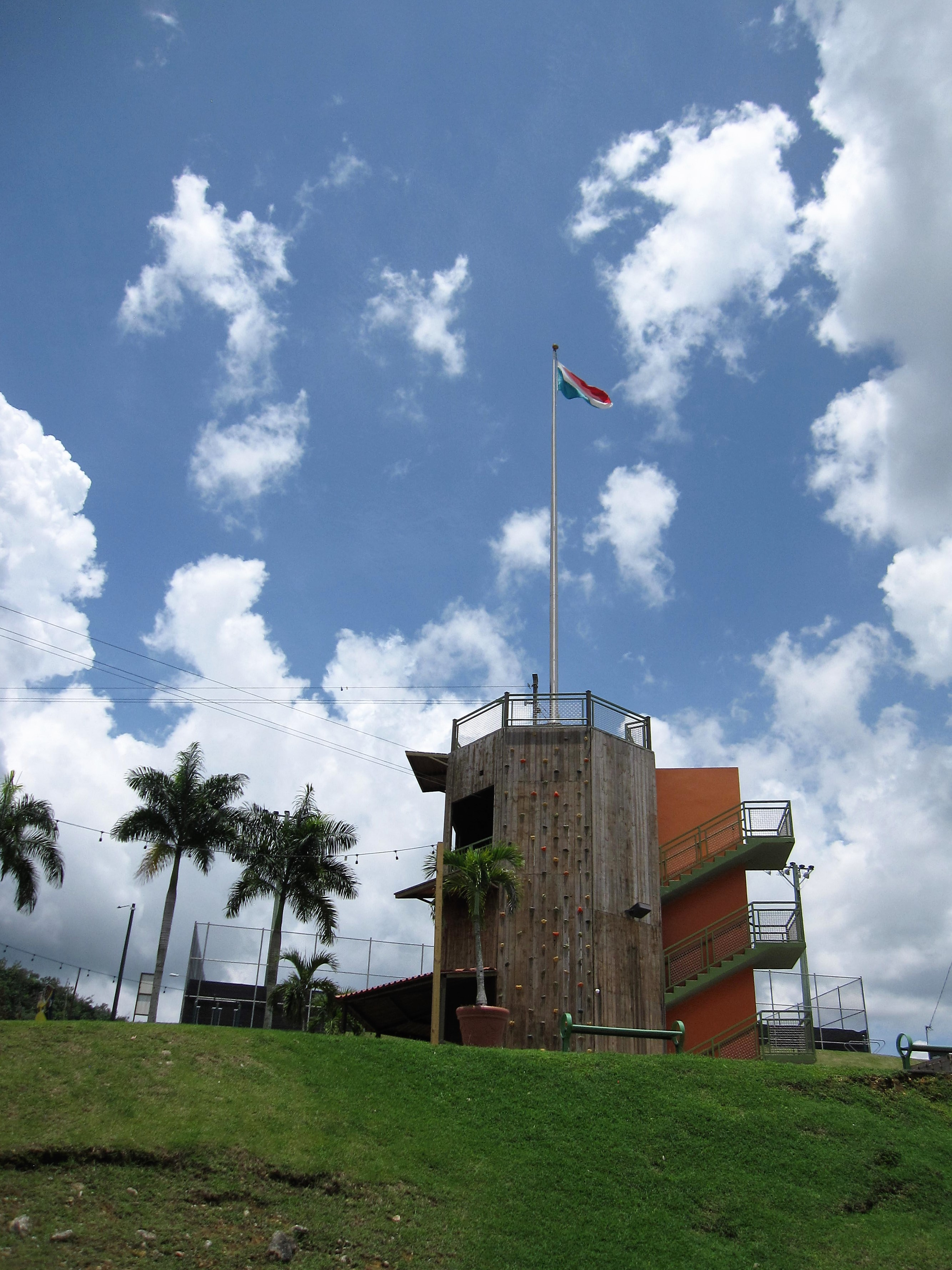
Rock climbing wall at Veredas Sports Complex in Guatemala

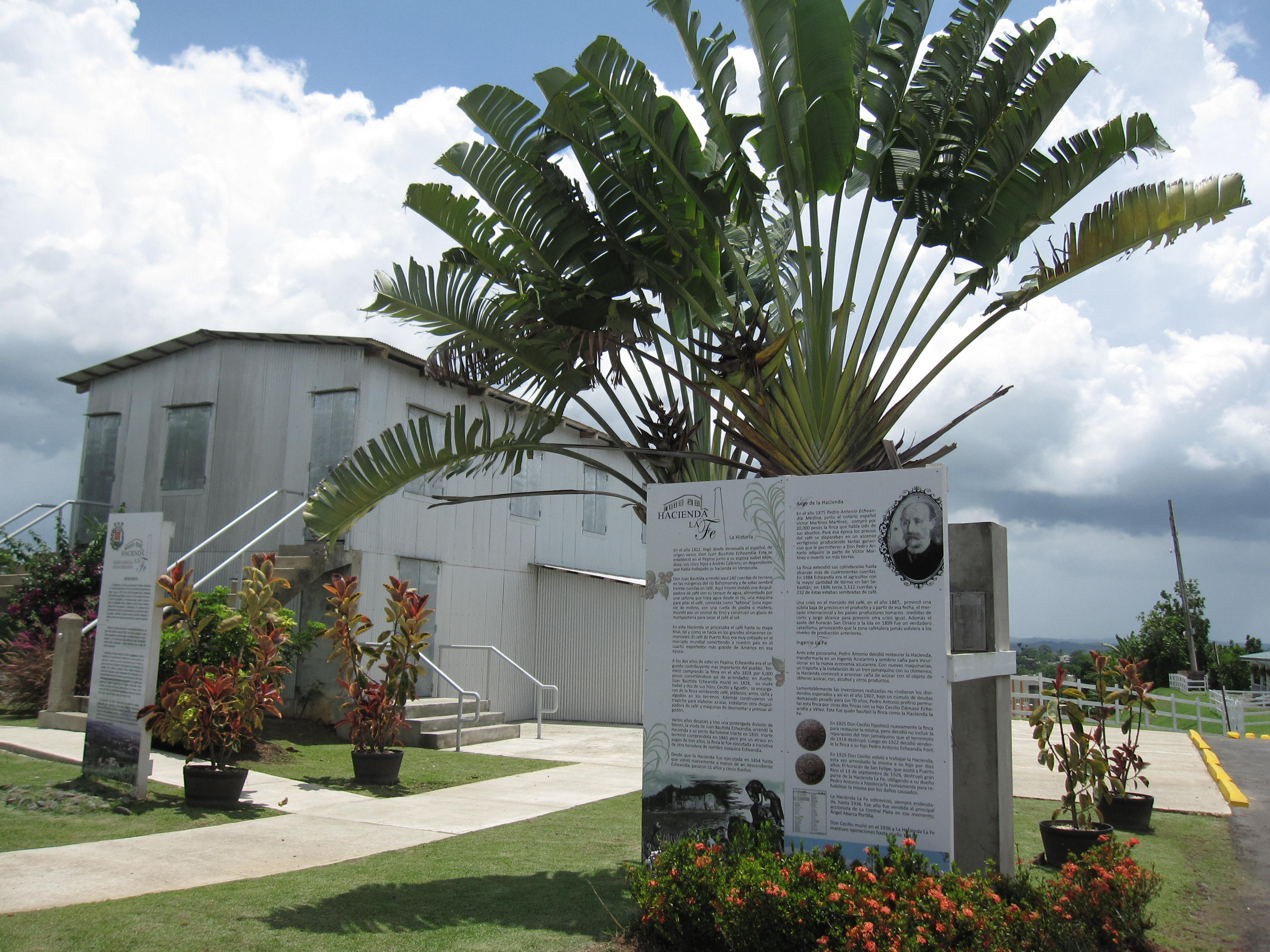
Hacienda la Fe museum at Veredas Sports Complex in Guatemala

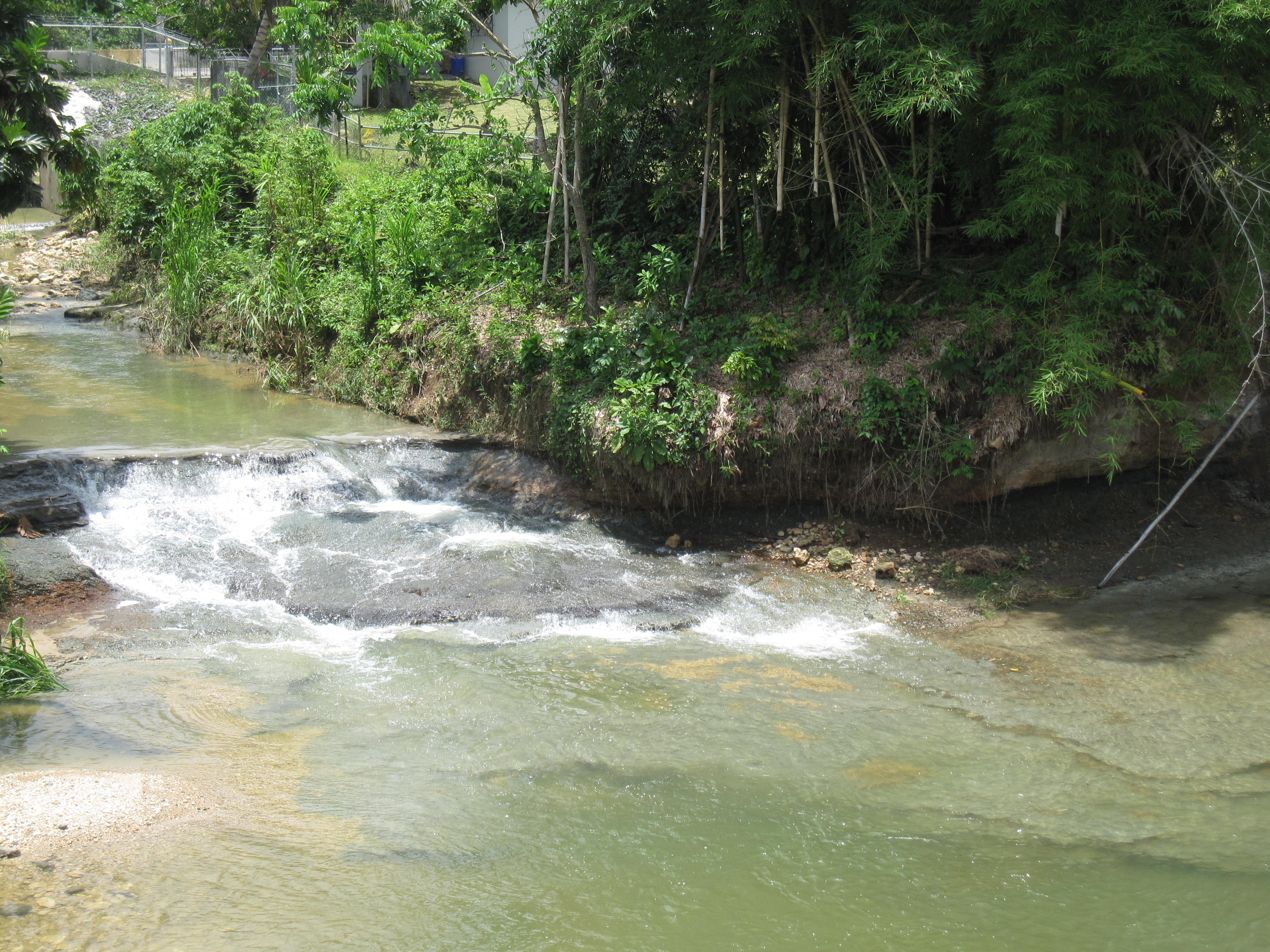
Guatemala River in Guatemala

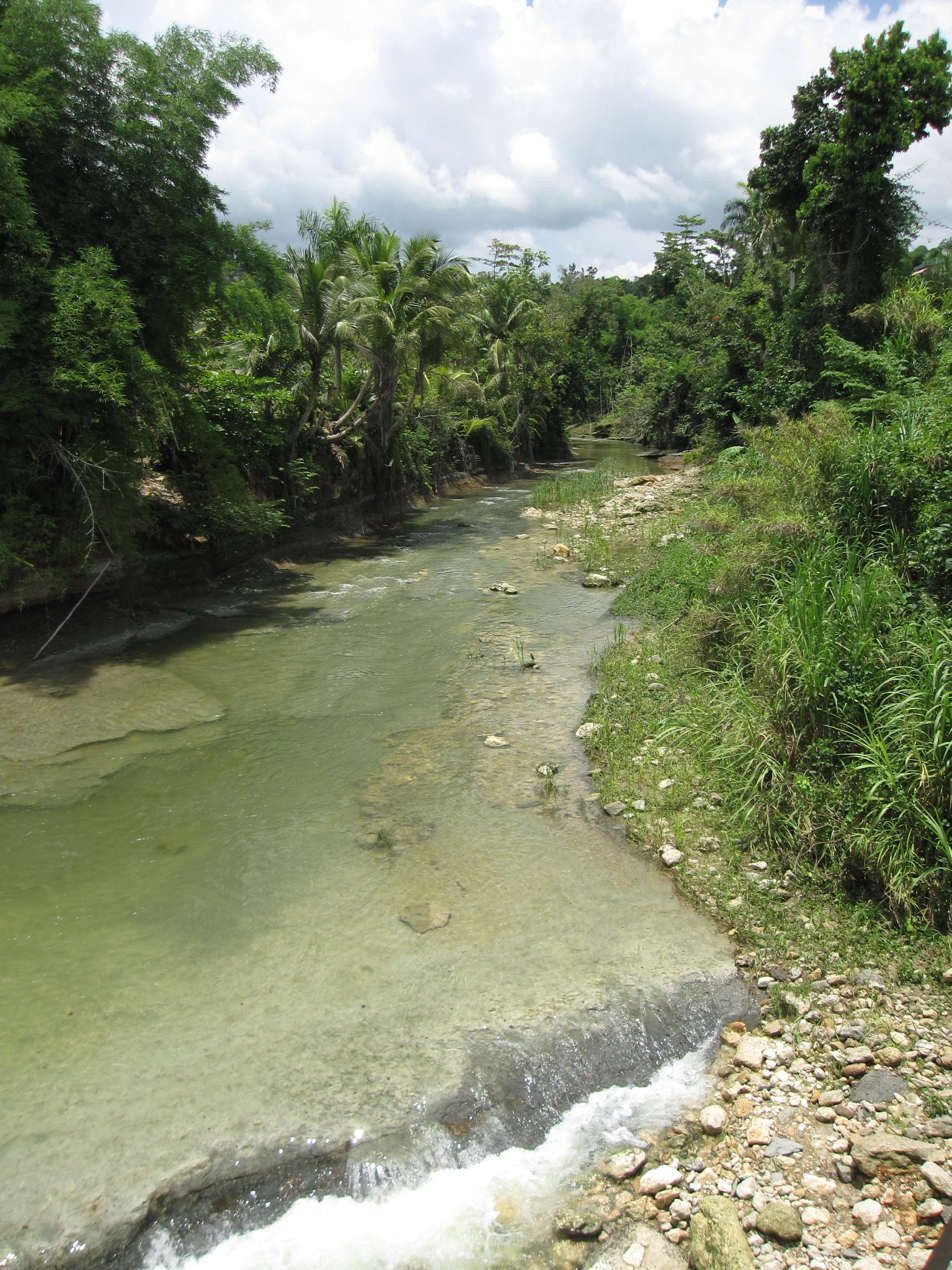
Guatemala River in Guatemala barrio

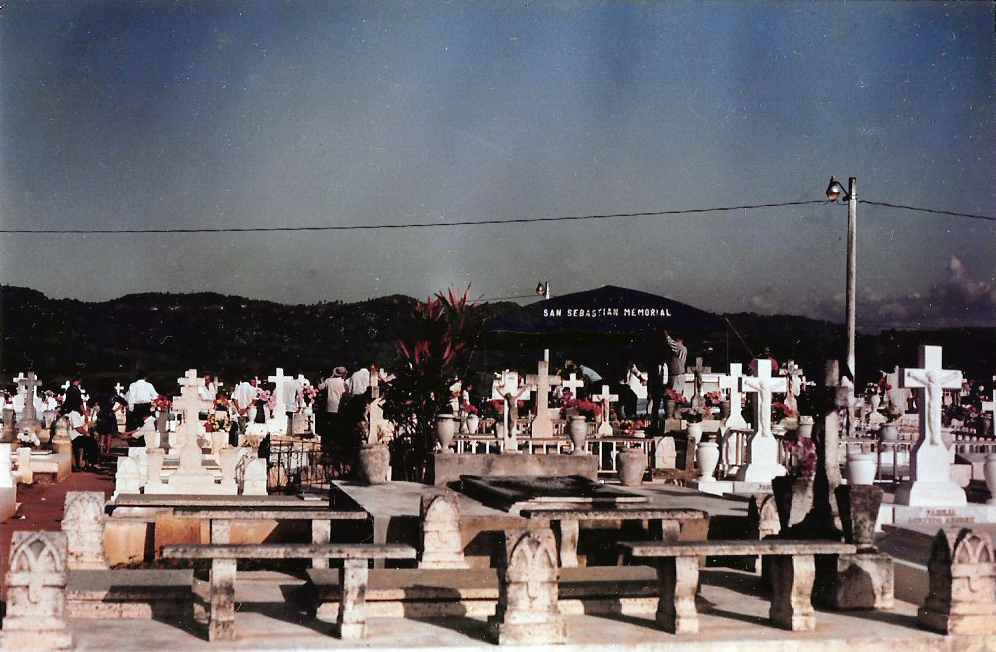
San Sebastián Memorial

== See also ==
- List of communities in Puerto Rico
- List of barrios and sectors of San Sebastián, Puerto Rico
