= Bahomamey =

Barrio of San Sebastián, Puerto Rico

- Barrio
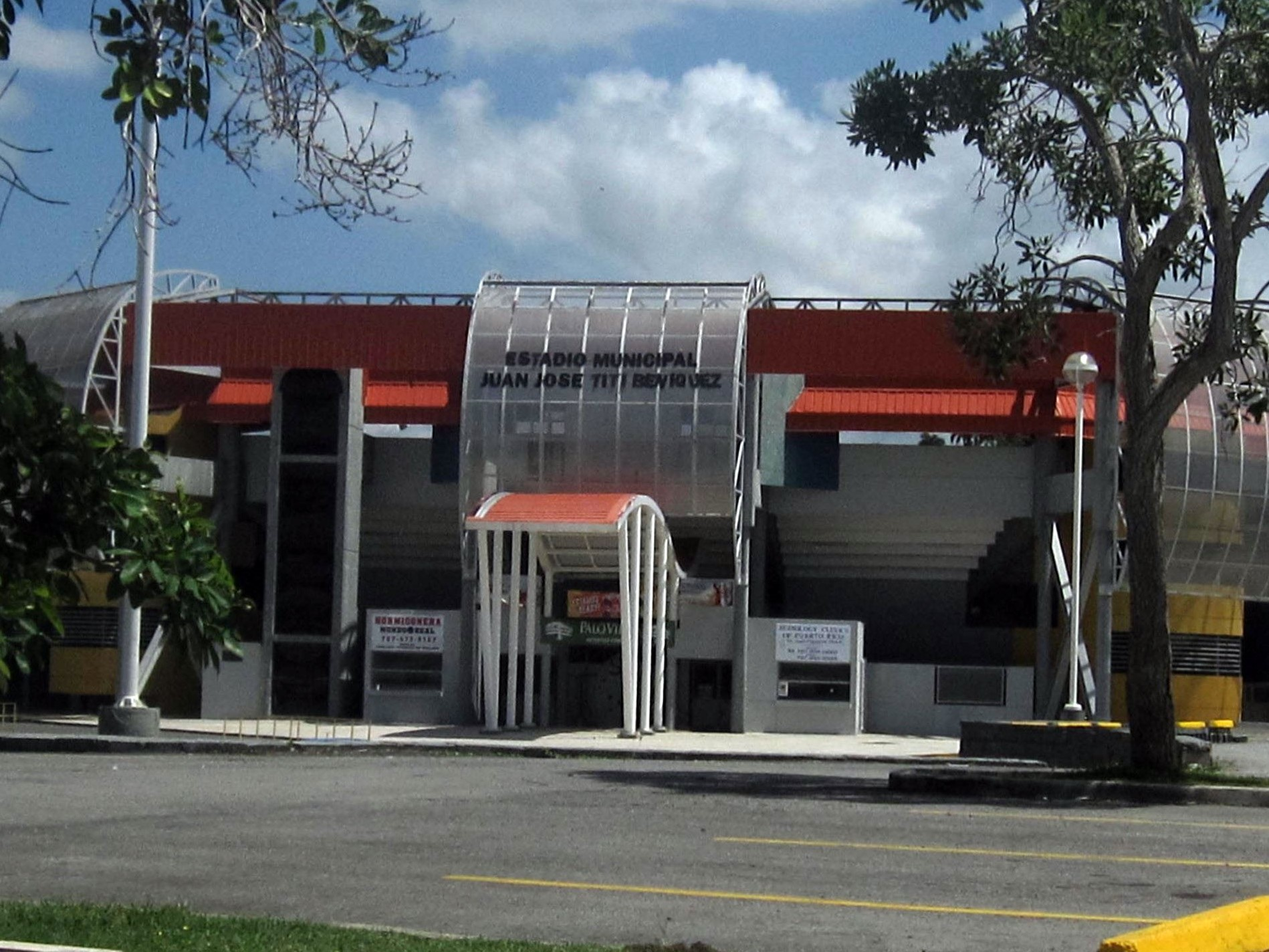
- Stadium in Bahomamey

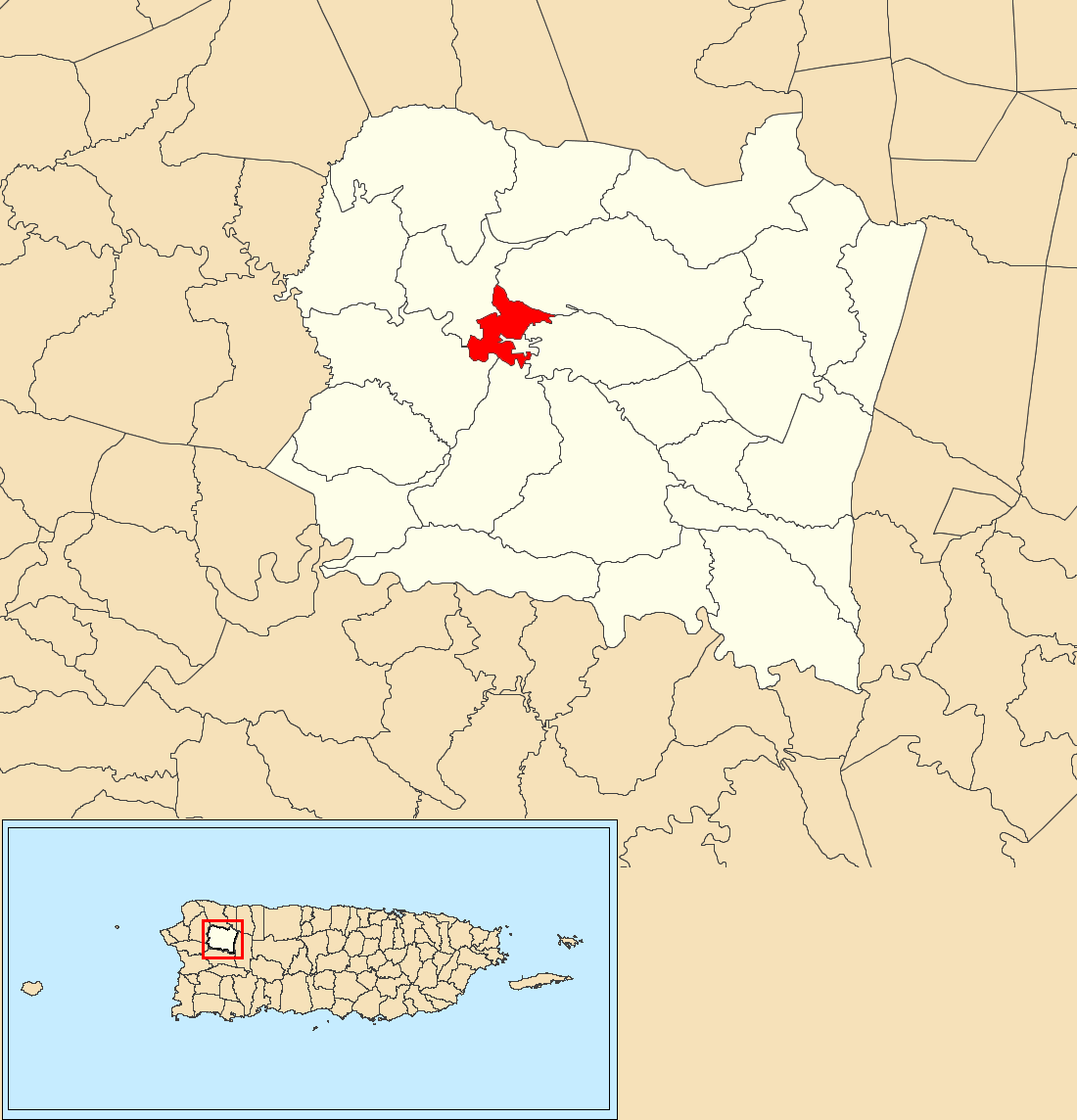
- Location of Bahomamey within the municipality of San Sebastián shown in red

- Location of Puerto Rico
- Coordinates: 18°20′26″N 66°59′40″W
- Commonwealth: Puerto Rico
- Municipality: San Sebastián

Area
  - Total: 0.78 sq mi (2.0 km^{2})
  - Land: 0.78 sq mi (2.0 km^{2})
  - Water: 0 sq mi (0 km^{2})
- Elevation: 194 ft (59 m)

Population (2010)
  - Total: 2,218
  - Density: 2,843.6/sq mi (1,097.9/km^{2})
- Source: 2010 Census
- Time zone: UTC−4 (AST)
- Area code: 787

Bahomamey is a barrio in the municipality of San Sebastián, Puerto Rico. Its population in 2010 was 2,218.

== History ==
Bahomamey was in Spain's gazetteers until Puerto Rico was ceded by Spain in the aftermath of the Spanish–American War under the terms of the Treaty of Paris of 1898 and became an unincorporated territory of the United States. In 1899, the United States Department of War conducted a census of Puerto Rico finding that the combined population of Bahomamey barrio and Guatemala barrio was 1,126.

Historical population
Census	Pop.	Note	%±
1910	584		—
1920	578		−1.0%
1930	601		4.0%
1940	832		38.4%
1950	1,226		47.4%
1960	2,888		135.6%
1970	0		−100.0%
1980	3,116		—
1990	2,915		−6.5%
2000	2,740		−6.0%
2010	2,218		−19.1%
U.S. Decennial Census; 1900 (N/A) 1910-1930; 1930-1950 1980-2000 2010

== Sectors ==
Barrios (which are, in contemporary times, roughly comparable to minor civil divisions) in turn are further subdivided into smaller local populated place areas/units called sectores (sectors in English). The types of sectores may vary, from normally sector to urbanización to reparto to barriada to residencial, among others.

The following sectors are in Bahomamey barrio:

Barriada Pueblo Nuevo, Barriada Stalingrado, Barriada Tablastilla, Calle Juan F. Cortés, Sector Chinto Rodón, Urbanización Guayabal, and Urbanización Olivencia.

== Gallery ==
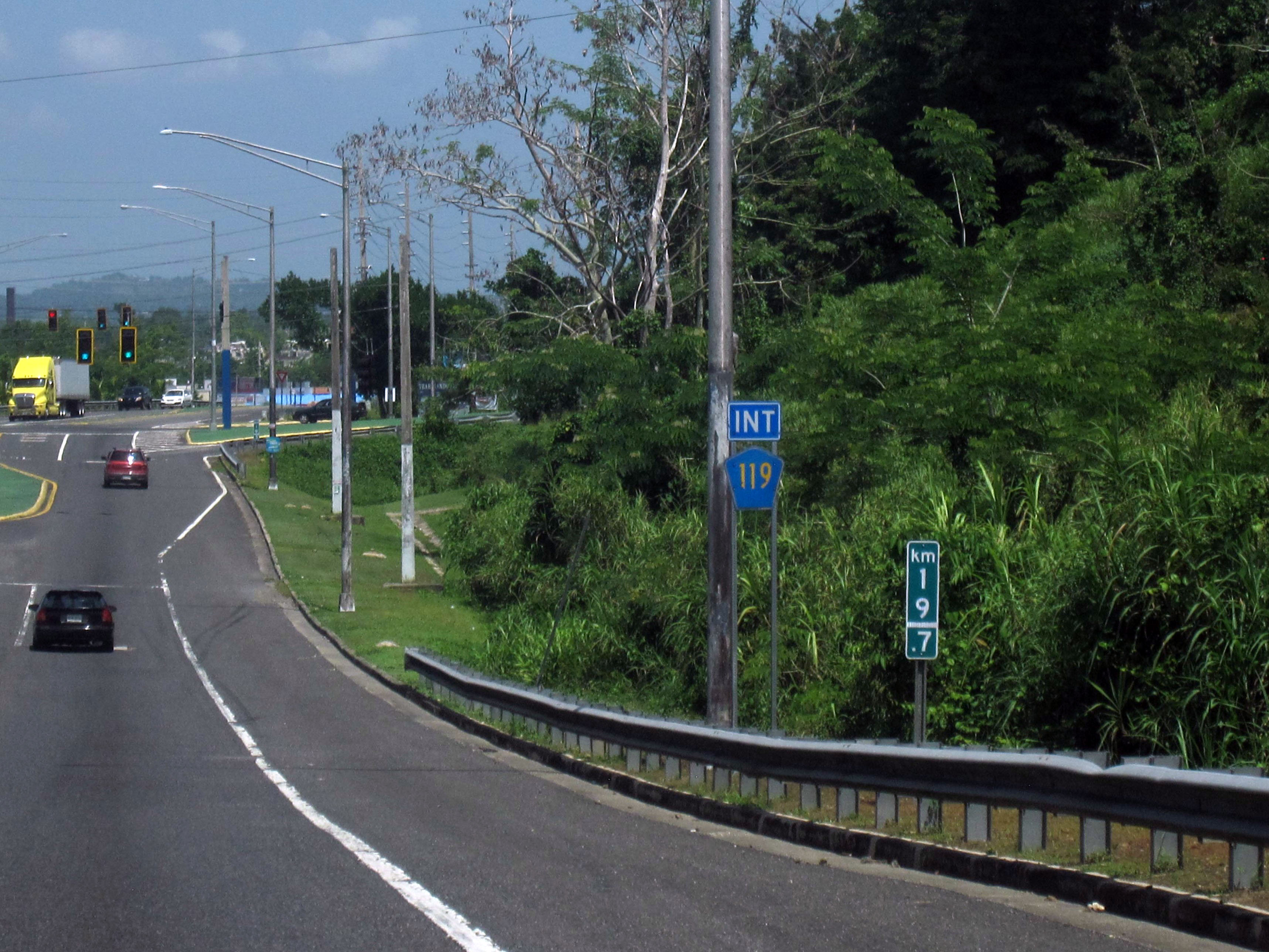
PR-111 in Bahomamey

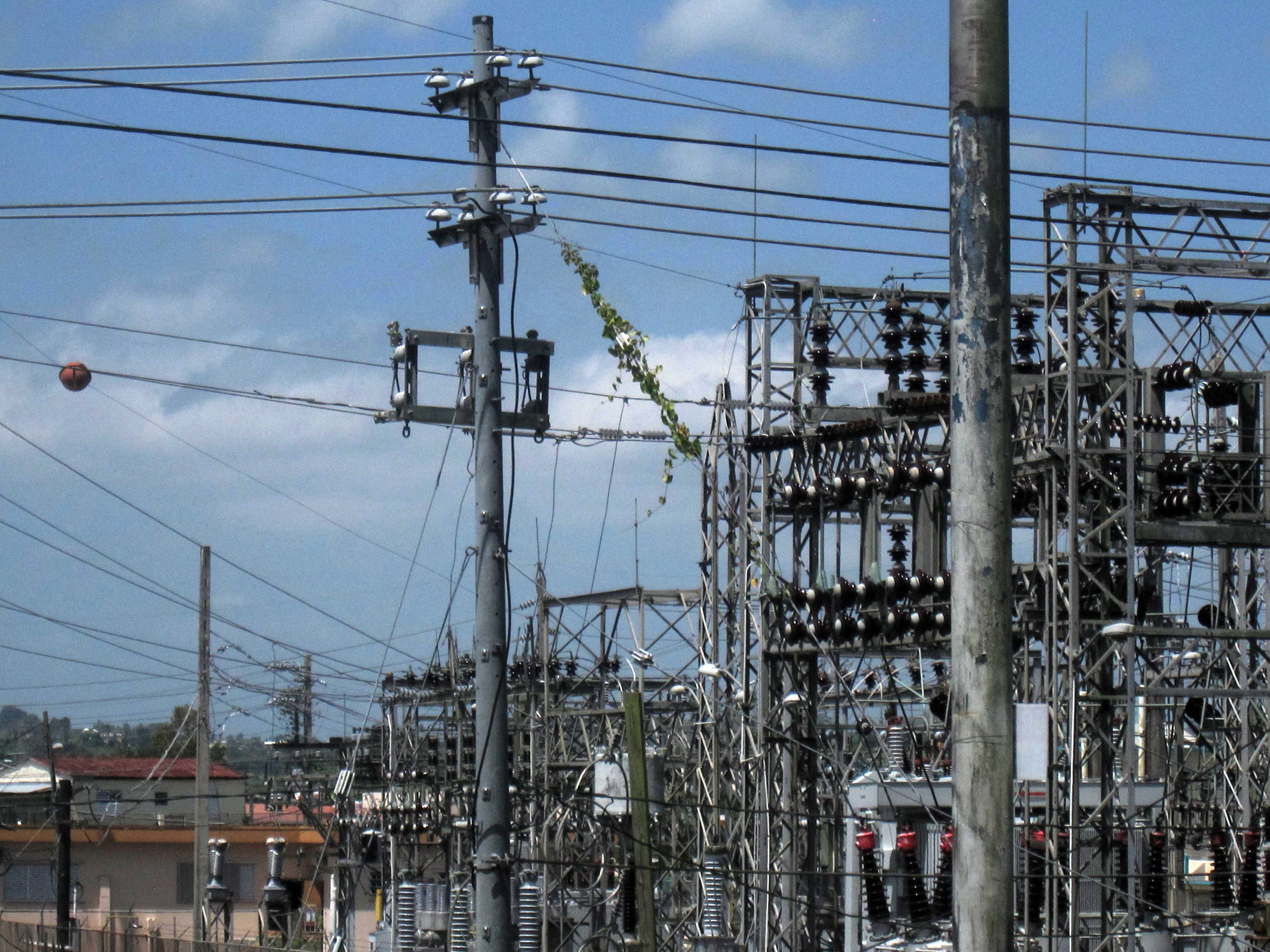
Power plant on PR-111

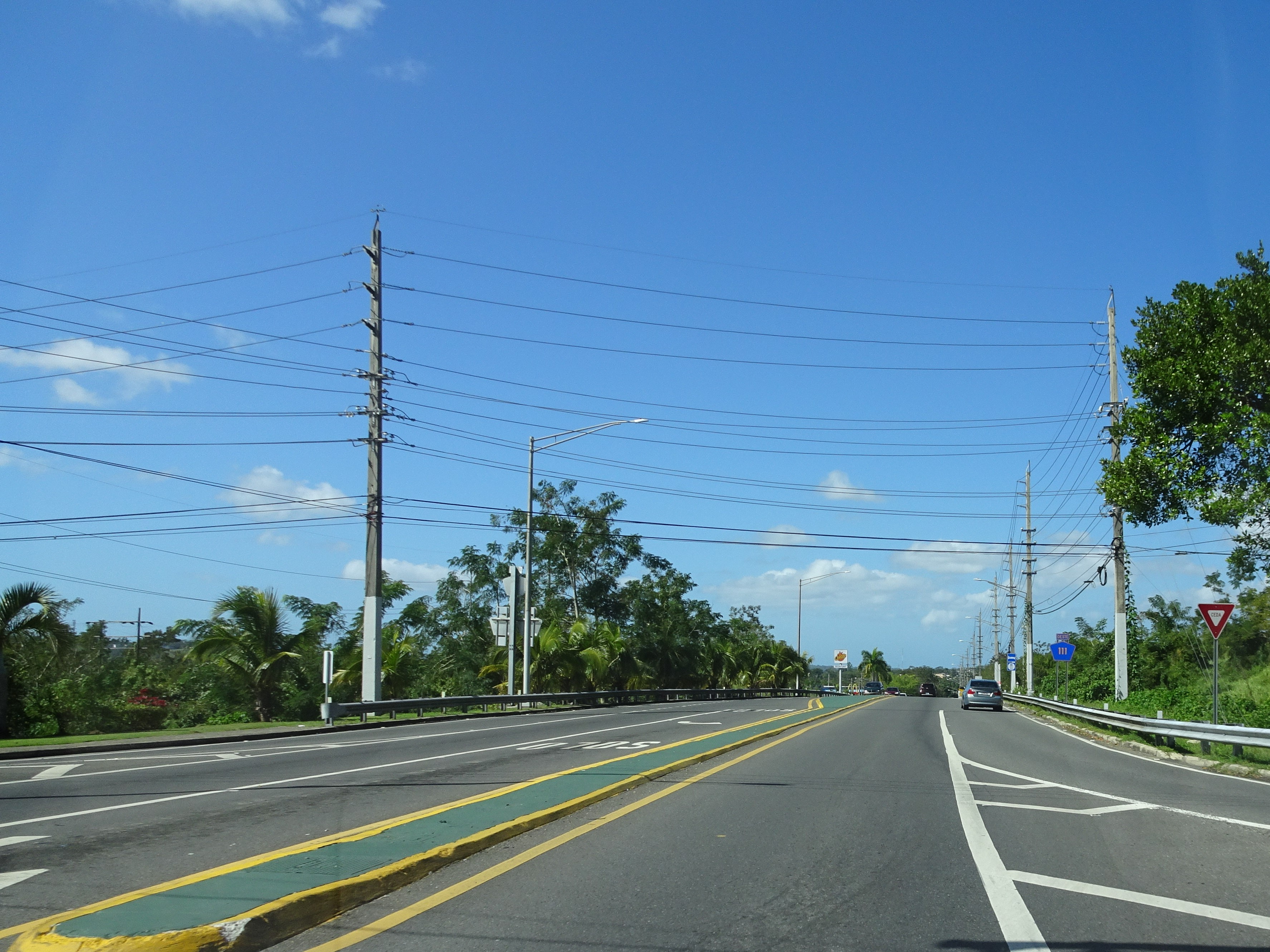
PR-111 in Bahomamey

== See also ==
- List of communities in Puerto Rico
- List of barrios and sectors of San Sebastián, Puerto Rico
