= Festival de la Novilla =

Festival held in San Sebastián, Puerto Rico

The San Sebastian Heifer Festival or Festival de la Novilla is a popular festival in Puerto Rico, held annually in the municipality of San Sebastián on the third weekend of January, during the town's fiestas patronales (Spanish for patron saint feast) dedicated to Saint Sebastian. The weekend-long event is one of Puerto Rico's best known festivals, drawing visitors from all over the island. San Sebastián is located in the western mountainous region of Puerto Rico, close to Aguadilla and Mayagüez.

The festival is dedicated to the heifer (novilla in Spanish) and cattle husbandry, which is an important industry in the region. A heifer is a young cow that is over a year old which has not given birth yet (and consequently has not produced milk yet). The festival also showcases fresh agricultural products, typical dishes and street food, folk music, salsa dance and other cultural events. The festival closes with a parade of floats and cows led by a heifer adorned with flower crowns and ribbons. In addition to showcasing the town's agriculture, the festival is important for the region as it also serves as a fundraiser for local scholarships.

== History ==
Even if the Festival de la Novilla was first celebrated in 1977, the town has celebrated similar events as part of the patronal festival since the town's founding in the 18th century. Cows and cattle raising are important to the economy and culture of the town and the region. The first official Heifer Festival was held in January 1977 and it was organized by the Club Altrusa de San Sebastian, a club founded in 1976 by and dedicated to women in business, with the purpose of fundraising for improving the education of girls of the community. The club still organizes the festival and it still raises funds for improving services in the community and developing educational projects in the municipality. Another purpose of the festival today is to showcase old traditions so visitors and younger generations can learn about the town's past.

The 2018 celebration was dedicated to the victims of Hurricane Maria and that year's heifer was named Esperanza (Spanish for hope).

== Heifer Parade ==
The heifer parade is the main event of the festival. The parade is led by a heifer which is adorned with a flower crown, colorful ribbons and painted hooves. A new heifer is chosen every year to lead the parade and it is traditional to praise her by applauding and calling it "mira que linda!" (Spanish for look how pretty [she is]!) as the parade passes by. The parade also includes other cows, themed-floats, musicians and marching bands, and local artists. Other "characters" that appear in the parade and the celebrations are Don Pepe, who represents the character of the town crier who makes public announcements, and La Titina, an over-garnished character who represents the celebrations themselves. Another stock character, Los Negritos (Spanish for the little black children), is normally portrayed by children. This has come into criticism in recent years due to the fact that children portray them with blackface. The parade starts at 10am at corner of Route 111 and Route 445, and follows along Route 111 for a while until Route 119. About 60 thousand people visit or participate in the festival each year.

== Gallery ==
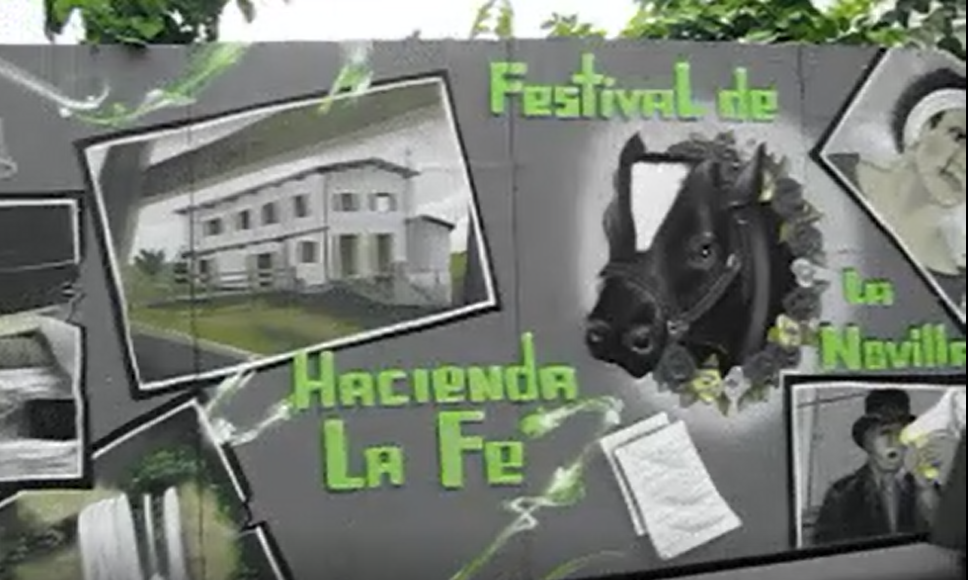
festival in San Sebastián

== See also ==
- San Sebastián Street Festival
