= Alto Sano, San Sebastián, Puerto Rico =

Barrio of Puerto Rico

Alto Sano Altosano
- Barrio
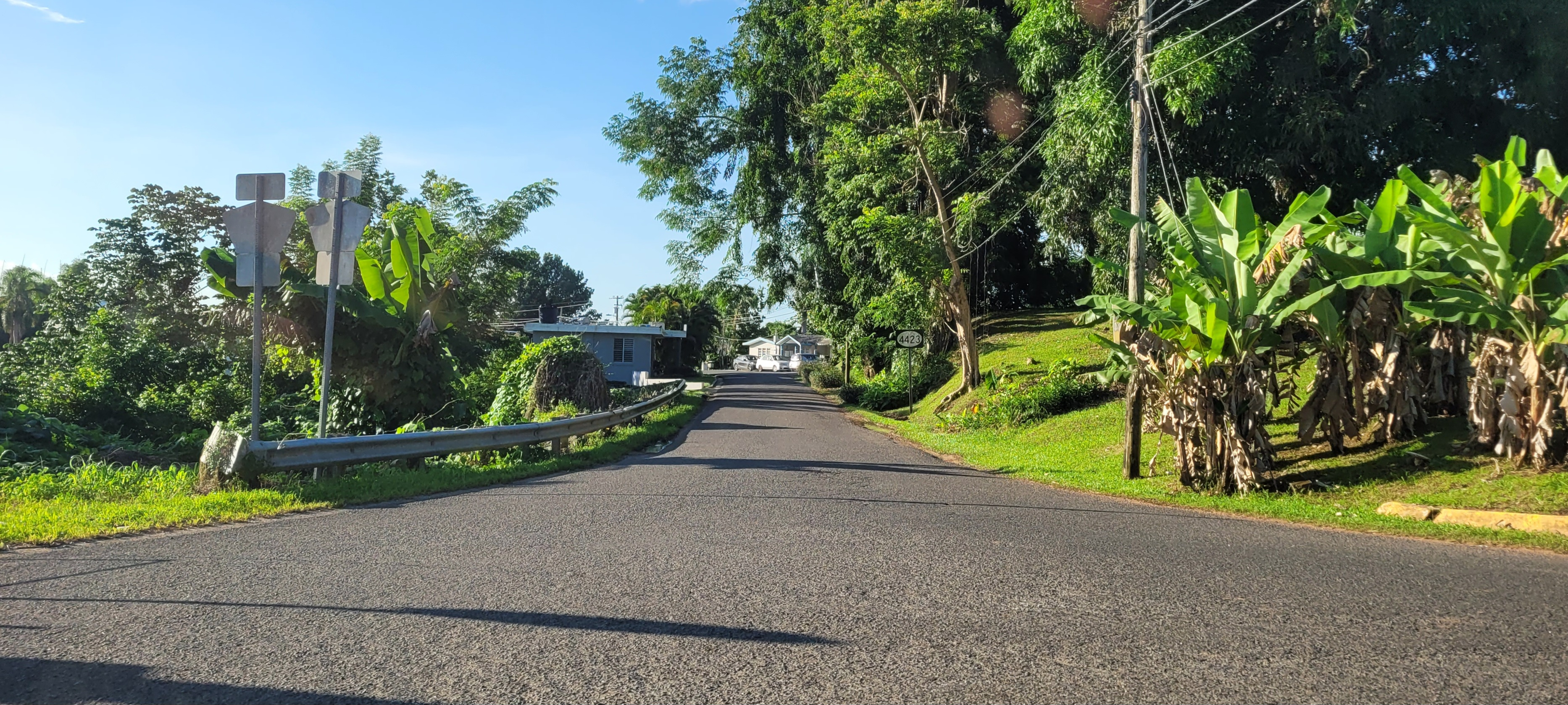
- Puerto Rico Highway 4423 in Alto Sano

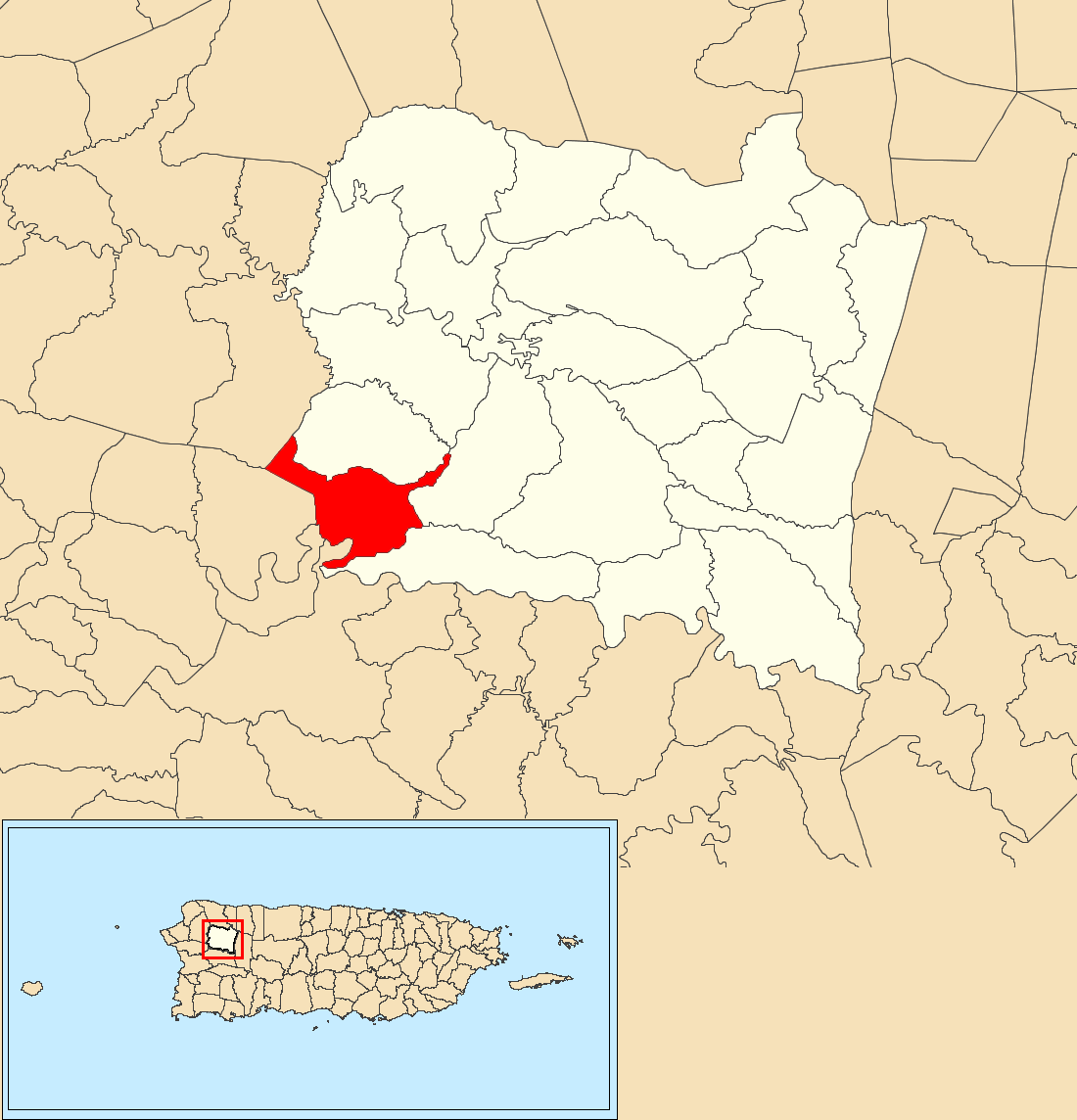
- Location of Alto Sano within the municipality of San Sebastián shown in red

- Location of Puerto Rico
- Coordinates: 18°17′51″N 67°01′42″W
- Commonwealth: Puerto Rico
- Municipality: San Sebastián

Area
  - Total: 2.36 sq mi (6.1 km^{2})
  - Land: 2.33 sq mi (6.0 km^{2})
  - Water: 0.03 sq mi (0.078 km^{2})
- Elevation: 262 ft (80 m)

Population (2010)
  - Total: 920
  - Density: 394.8/sq mi (152.4/km^{2})
- Source: 2010 Census
- Time zone: UTC−4 (AST)

Alto Sano (a.k.a. Altosano) is a barrio in the municipality of San Sebastián, Puerto Rico. Its population in 2010 was 920.

== History ==
Alto Sano was in Spain's gazetteers until Puerto Rico was ceded by Spain in the aftermath of the Spanish–American War under the terms of the Treaty of Paris of 1898 and became an unincorporated territory of the United States. In 1899, the United States Department of War conducted a census of Puerto Rico finding that the combined population of Alto Sano (Altosano) barrio and Sonador barrio was 862.

Historical population
Census	Pop.	Note	%±
1910	399		—
1920	423		6.0%
1930	323		−23.6%
1940	362		12.1%
1950	711		96.4%
1960	672		−5.5%
1970	607		−9.7%
1980	784		29.2%
1990	762		−2.8%
2000	1,282		68.2%
2010	920		−28.2%
U.S. Decennial Census; 1900 (N/A) 1910-1930; 1930-1950 1980-2000 2010

== Sectors ==
Barrios (which are, in contemporary times, roughly comparable to minor civil divisions) in turn are further subdivided into smaller local populated place areas/units called sectores (sectors in English). The types of sectores may vary, from normally sector to urbanización to reparto to barriada to residencial, among others.

The following sectors are in Alto Sano barrio:

Carretera 109, Sector El Cuartelillo, and Sector Los Ramírez.

== See also ==
- List of communities in Puerto Rico
- List of barrios and sectors of San Sebastián, Puerto Rico
