= San Sebastián, Puerto Rico =

Town and municipality in Puerto Rico

San Sebastián Municipio Autónomo de San Sebastián
- Town and Municipality
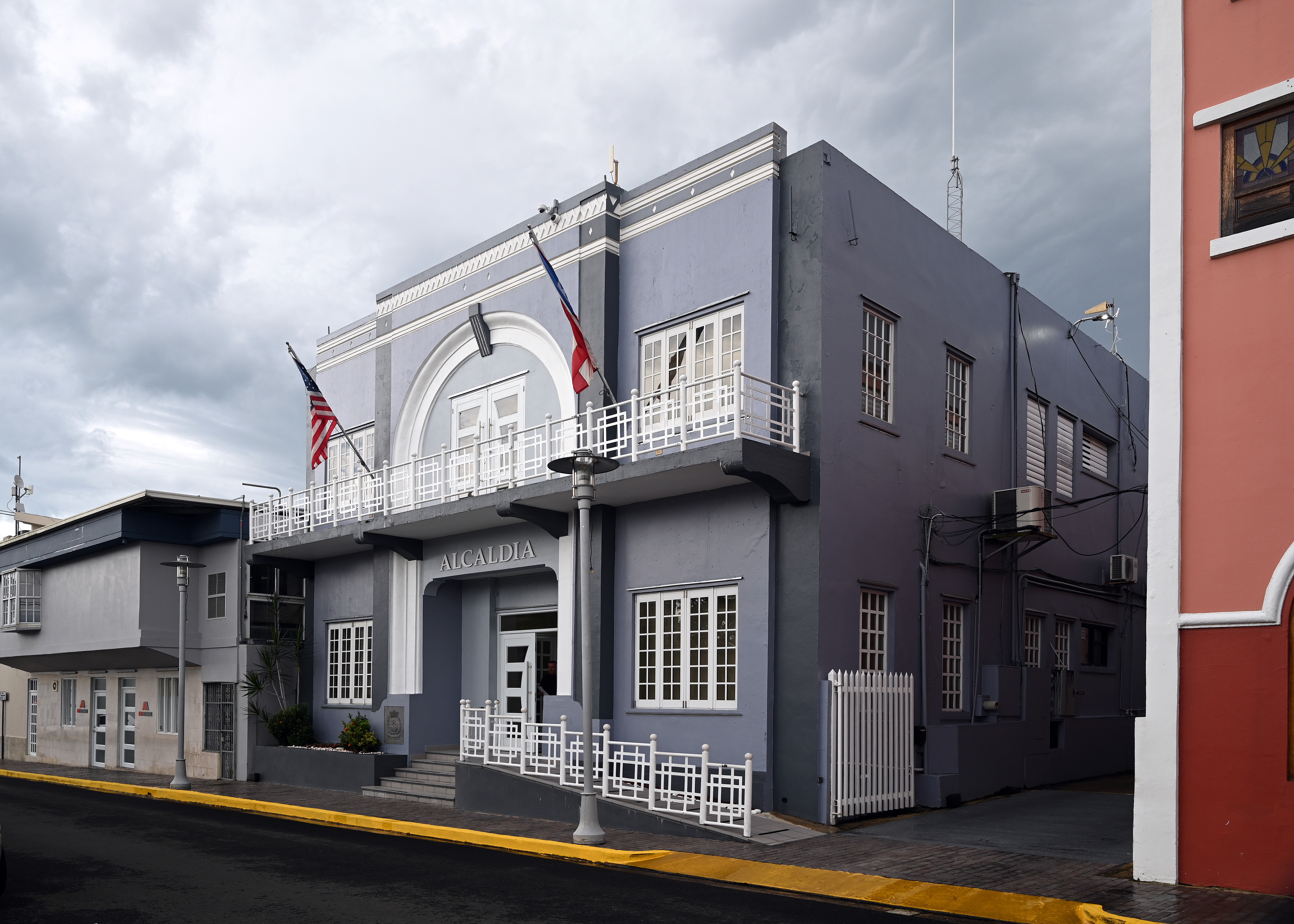
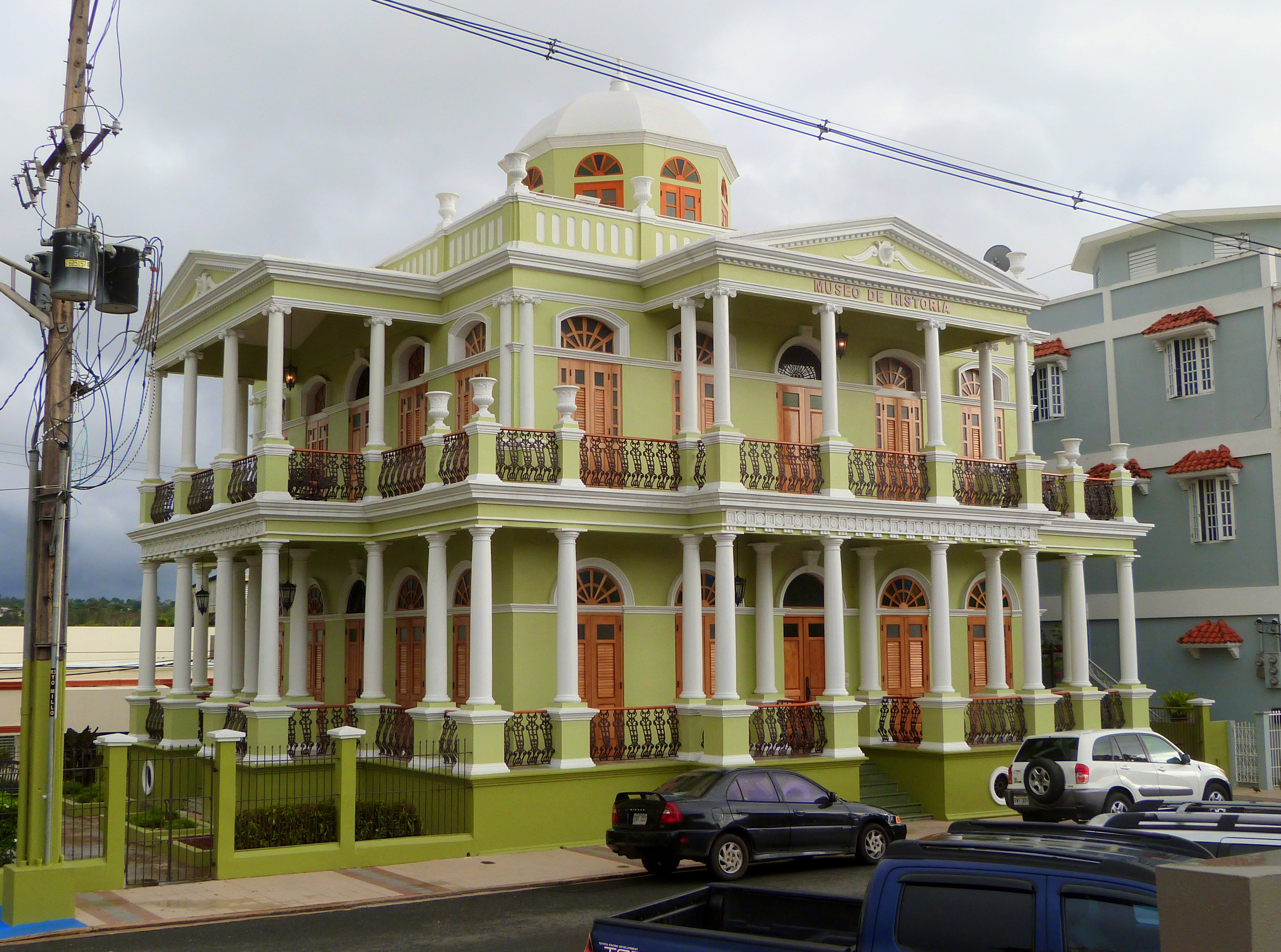
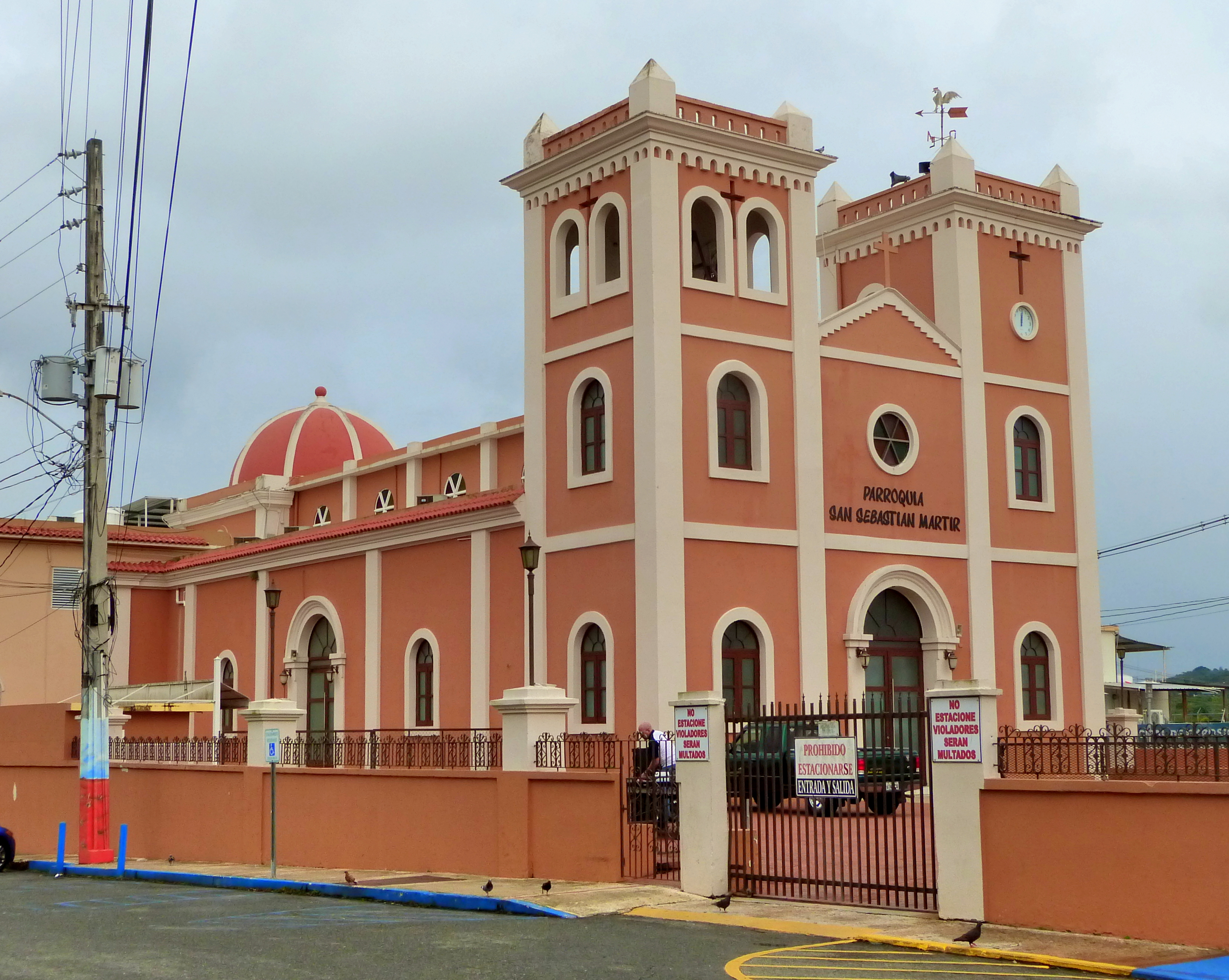
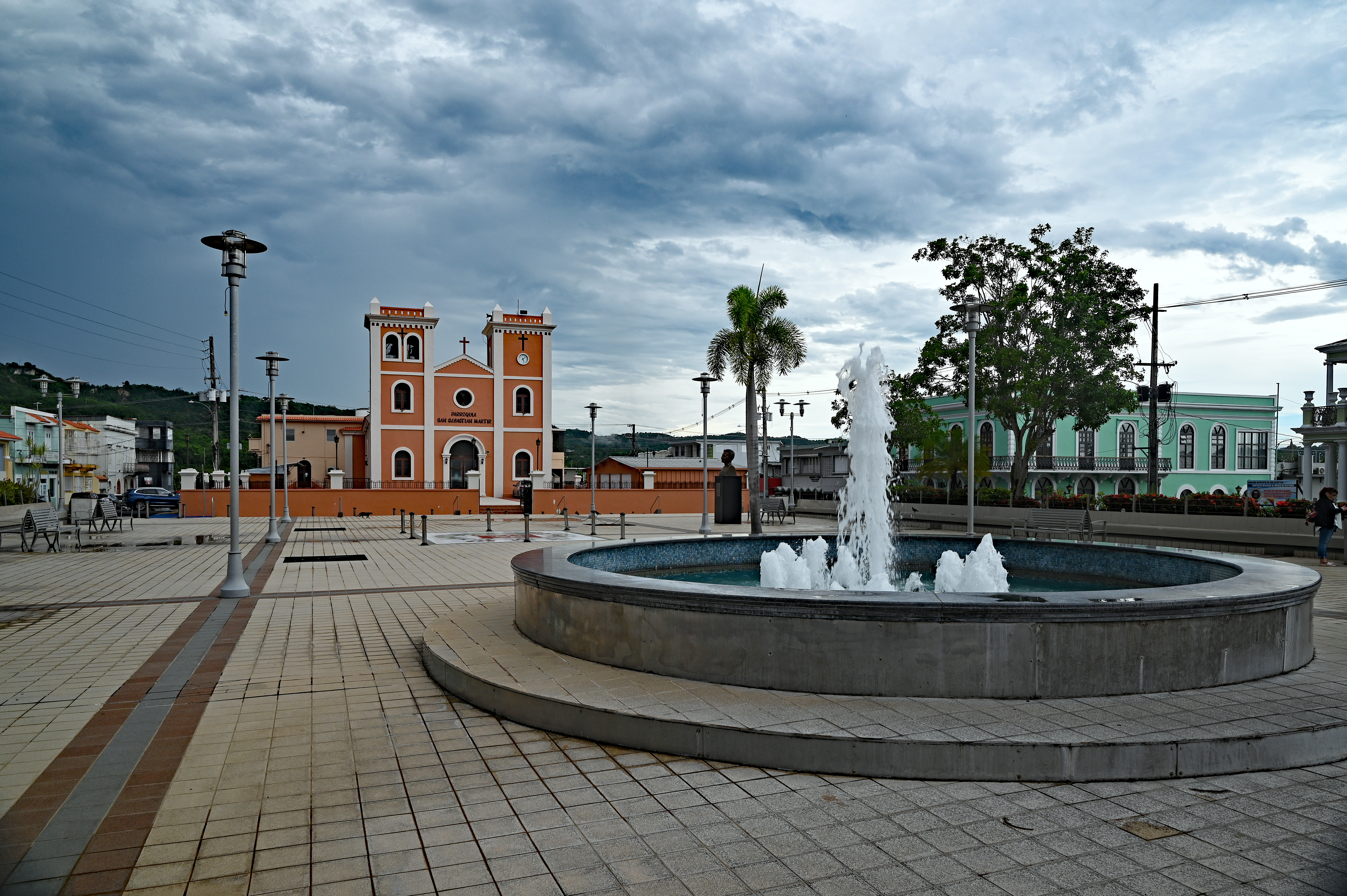
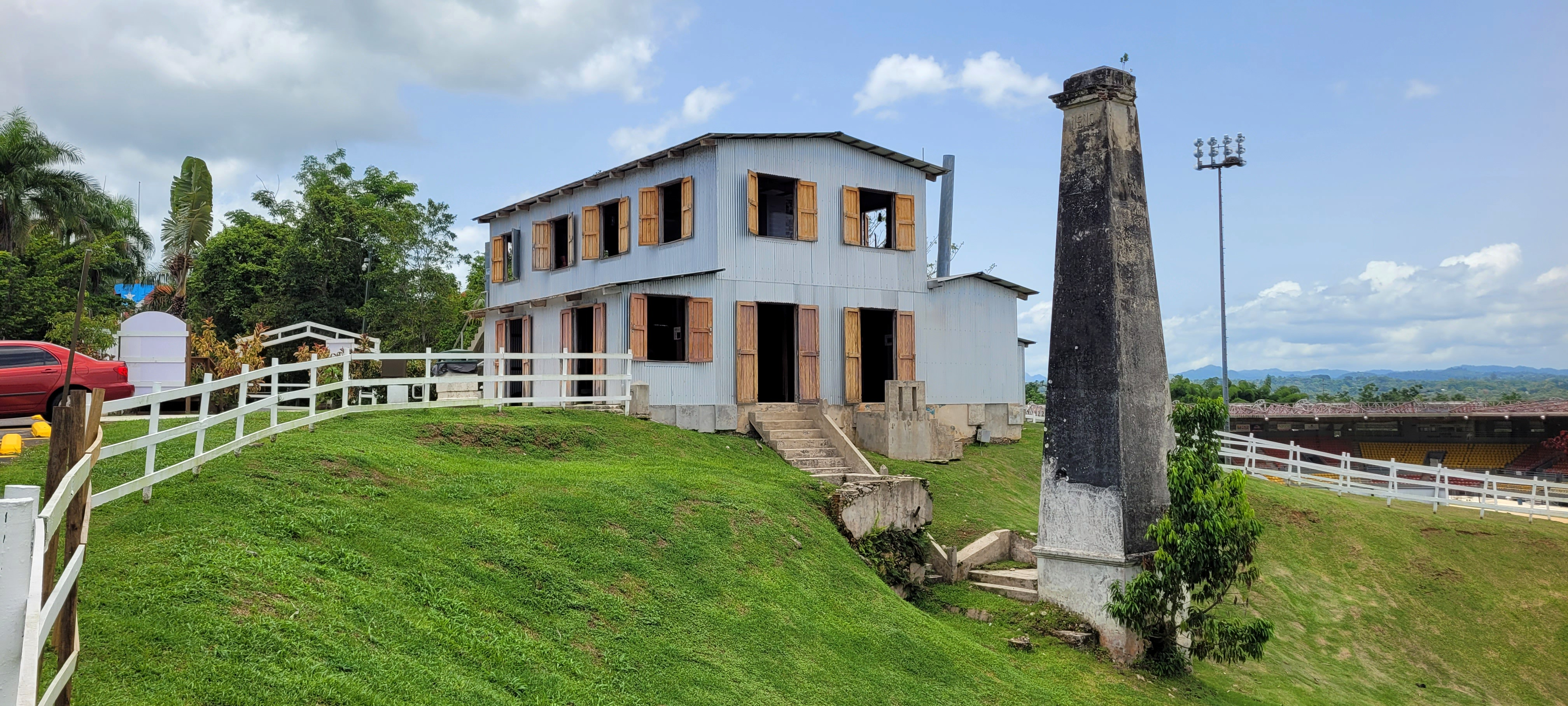
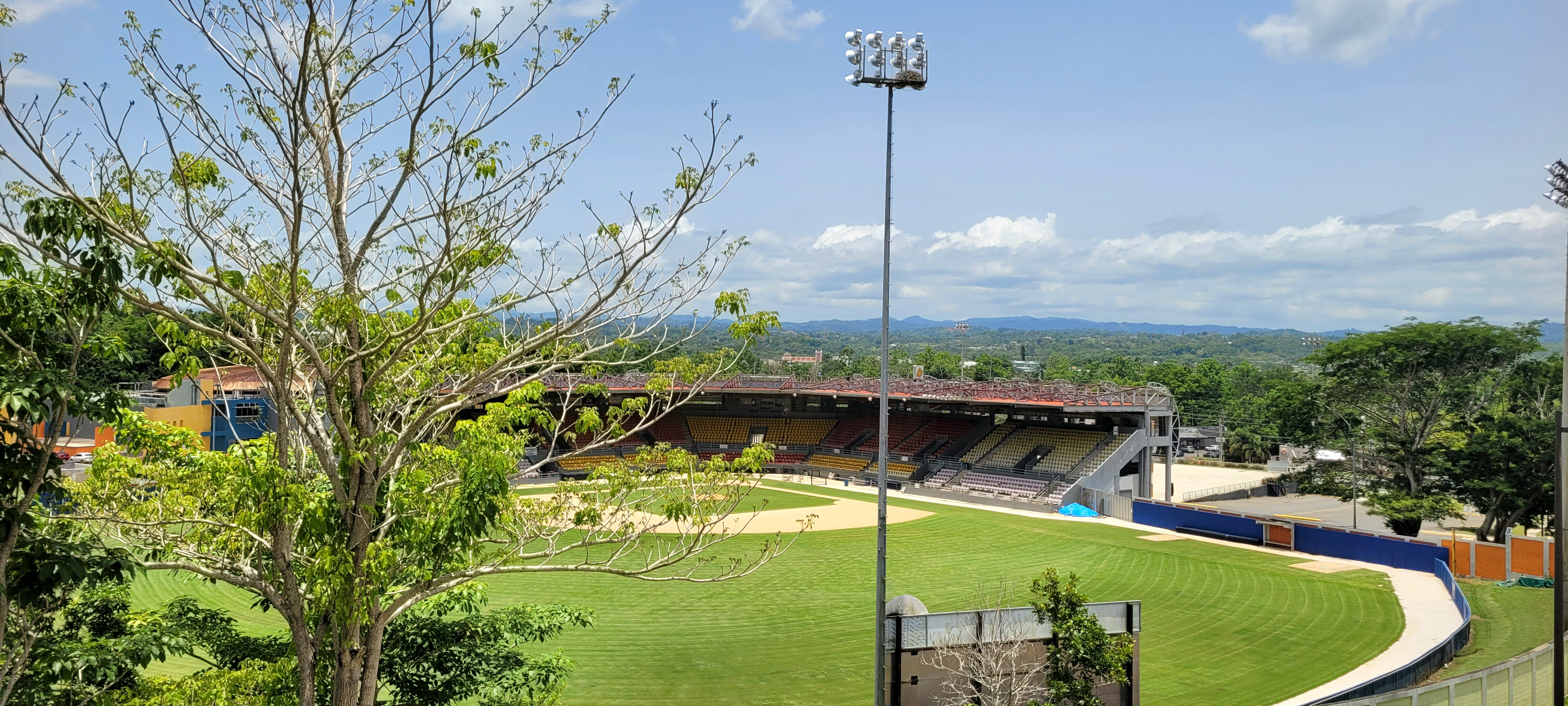
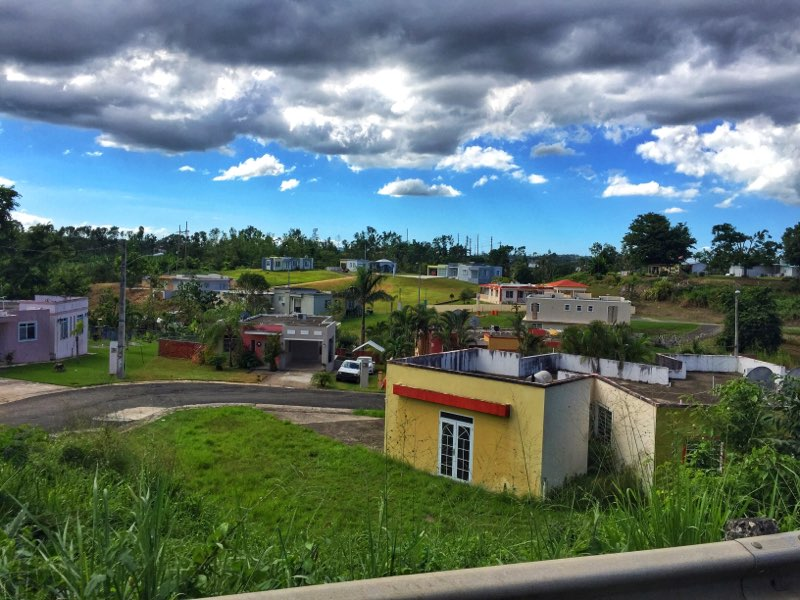
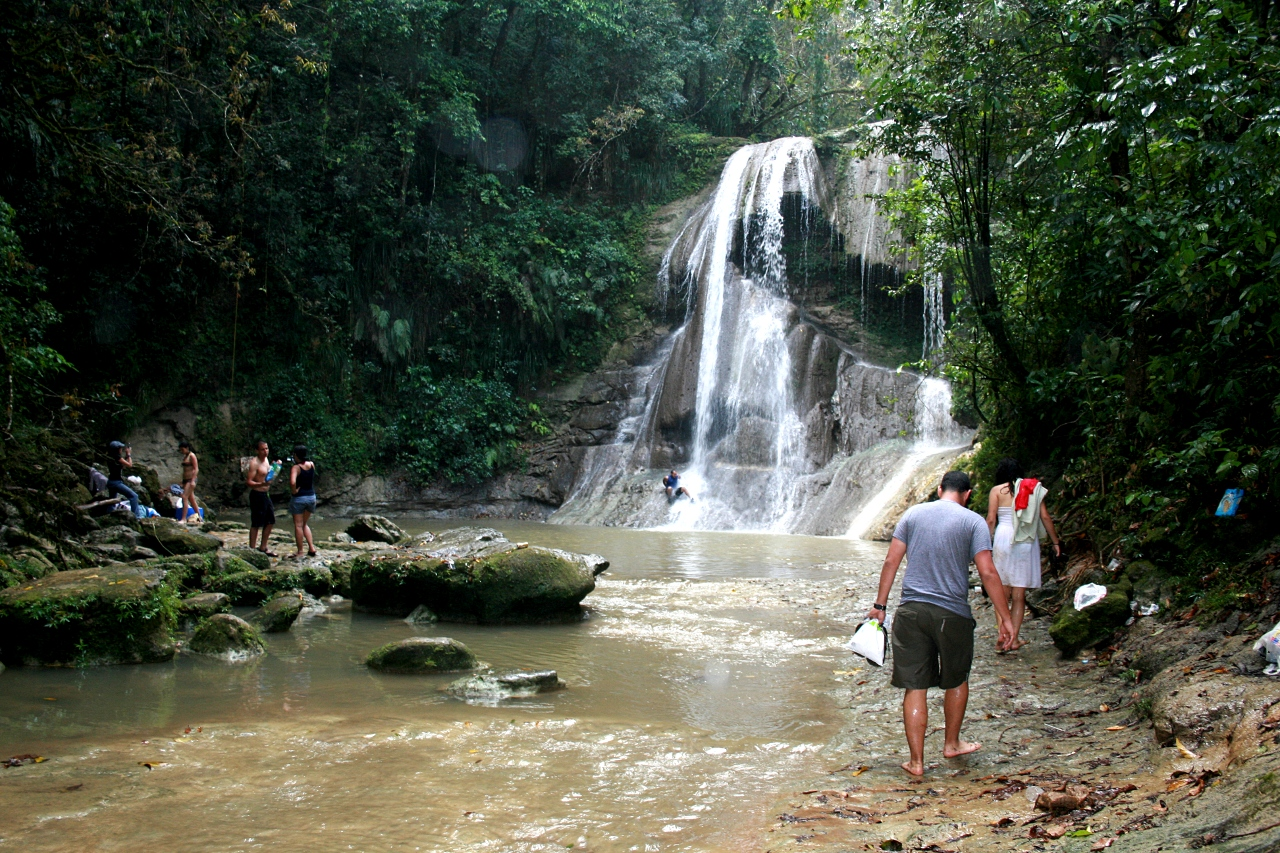
- San Sebastián; City Hall San Sebastián History Museum Saint Sebastian the Martyr Church San Sebastián Public Square Hacienda La Fe Agricultural Museum Juan José "Tití" Beníquez Stadium Rural neighborhood Gozalandia Falls

- Flag Coat of arms
- Nicknames: "San Sebastián Del Pepino", "Pepino", "Cuna de la Hamaca", "Los Patrulleros"
- Anthem: "Van más de dos siglos de historia de vida"
- Map of Puerto Rico highlighting San Sebastián Municipality
- Coordinates: 18°20′14″N 66°59′26″W
- Sovereign state: United States
- Commonwealth: Puerto Rico
- Founded: September 20, 1752
- Founder: Cristóbal González de la Cruz
- Named for: Saint Sebastian
- Barrios: 24 barrios: Aibonito; Alto Sano; Bahomamey; Calabazas; Cibao; Cidral; Culebrinas; Eneas; Guacio; Guajataca; Guatemala; Hato Arriba; Hoya Mala; Juncal; Magos; Mirabales; Perchas 1; Perchas 2; Piedras Blancas; Pozas; Robles; Salto; San Sebastián barrio-pueblo; Sonador

Government
  - Mayor: Eladio Cardona Quiles (PPD)
  - Senatorial dist.: 4 – Mayagüez

Area
  - Total: 71.73 sq mi (185.77 km^{2})
  - Land: 71.4 sq mi (185.0 km^{2})
  - Water: 0.30 sq mi (0.77 km^{2})

Population (2020)
  - Total: 39,345
  - Estimate (2025): 39,019 ▼
  - Rank: 24th in Puerto Rico
  - Density: 550.8/sq mi (212.7/km^{2})
- Demonym: Pepinianos
- Time zone: UTC−4 (AST)
- ZIP Code: 00685
- Area code: 787/939
- Website: ssdelpepino.com

San Sebastián (Spanish pronunciation: [san seβasˈtjan], locally [ˌsaŋ seβaʔˈtjaŋ]) is a town and municipality of Puerto Rico located in the northwestern region of the main island, south of Isabela, Quebradillas and Camuy; north of Las Marías; east of Moca and Añasco; and west of Lares. Named after Saint Sebastian the Martyr, it is spread over 24 barrios and San Sebastián Pueblo, which is the downtown area and the administrative center. It is a principal part of the Aguadilla Metropolitan Statistical Area.

== History ==
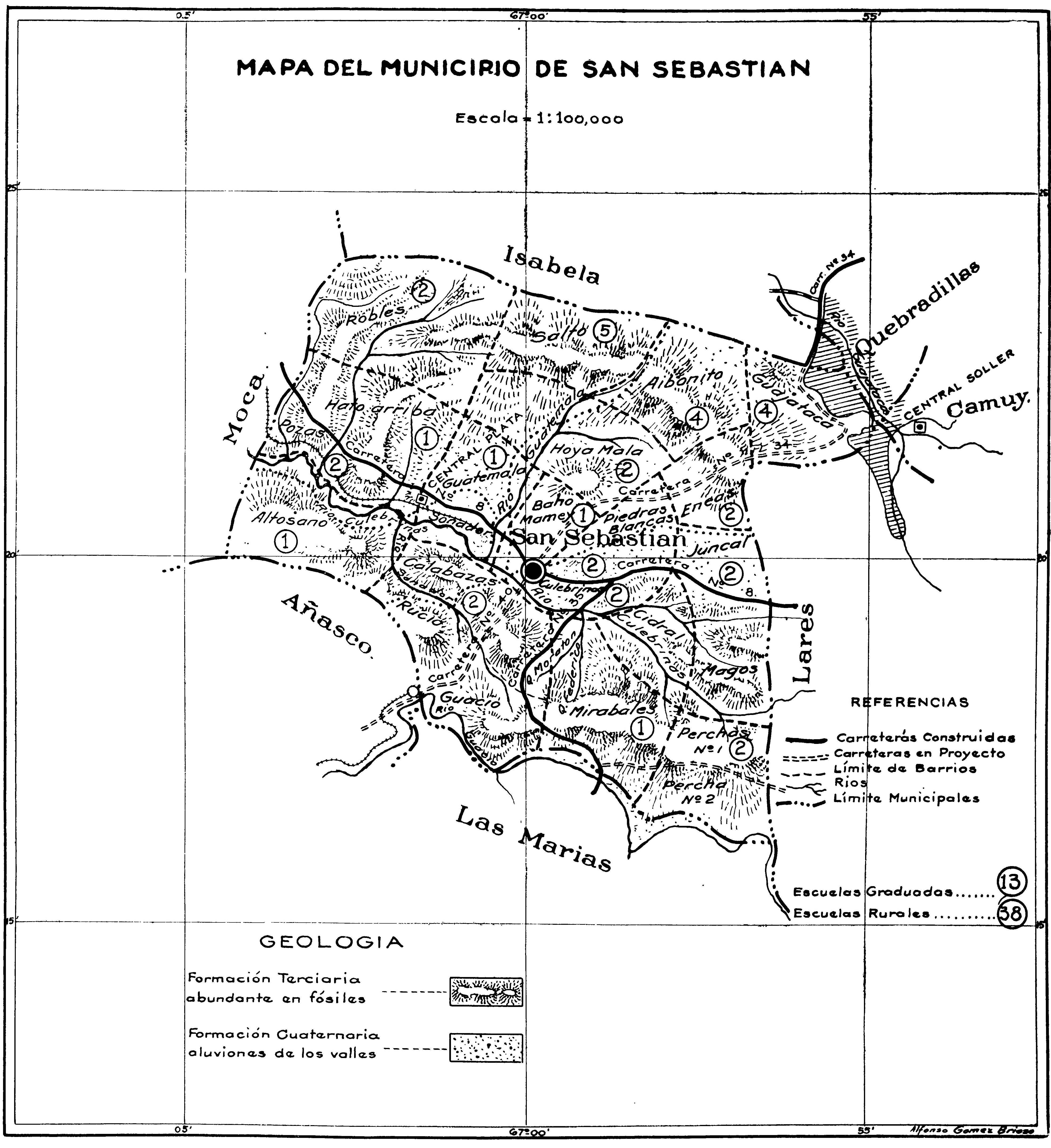
1929 map of San Sebastián

Permission to found the town was officially granted in 1752, under the leadership of founder, Captain Cristóbal González de la Cruz, who among other residents had an interest in converting some cow farms into an agricultural village. The foundation of the town from the religious aspect, was consummated in December 1762 by Mariano Martin, the island catholic bishop at that time. At the beginning, by 1700, San Sebastián was a conglomerate of a few cow farms, owned by some residents of the Partido de Aguada. Las Vegas was the former plain site of one of the first cow farms located by the Guatemala riverside at the north. Also, another of those cow farms was Pepinito (today's downtown) that was a prominent hill with a white calcium carbonate face. On the north side of the town it can be seen some of this pepinos (cucumbers). These two cow farms gave the town its first name. From these geographical features come the first names of the new village: Las Vegas del Pepino (Cucumber Fields). In 1865 it is documented as San Sebastián de Las Vegas del Pepino.

At the beginning of the 19th century, wealthy Spanish families arrived in El Pepino, fleeing the revolutions of Venezuela and the Dominican Republic. Later, by 1850, several families from Catalonia and the Basque Country in Spain joined the large number of isleños (Canary Islanders) that had made El Pepino their home. These people, after taking over the local political power, developed a coffee industry and brought some material progress to the town. Basques in the municipality, in remembrance of their home region and its religious patron, saw the need of updating old traditions used by the Canary Islanders and started to call the town San Sebastián, and thus got the name formally changed by the central government authority. Nevertheless, the citizens of San Sebastián are popularly called pepinianos.

San Sebastián Mártir (Spanish for Saint Sebastian the Martyr) is the patron saint of archers and was chosen to be the patron saint of the town since its early history, first brought by the immigrants from the Canaries and later confirmed by the Basques, with the town name changed in 1869.

Hurricane Maria on September 20, 2017, triggered landslides in San Sebastián with significant amount of rainfall. The hurricane winds knocked all the power out and the town was left in the dark.

The 40,000 residents of San Sebastián were left without electrical power until locals restored it. Two weeks after the hurricane decimated the island, Javier Jiménez, the mayor at the time, noticed that help was not on the way. He decided his town would not wait for the Puerto Rico Electric Power Authority brigades to come and assembled an ad hoc team of volunteers, some who were retired AEE electricians. They set safety protocols, and their mandate was to get the electrical power back up and running for the people of San Sebastián. Four months after the hurricane, they had restored power to 2,500 homes and continued to restore power to about 60 homes every day. A monument honoring the accomplishments of the Pepino Power Authority, as they were quickly named, was erected in Plaza de la Identidad Pepiniana in San Sebastián barrio-pueblo.

== Geography ==
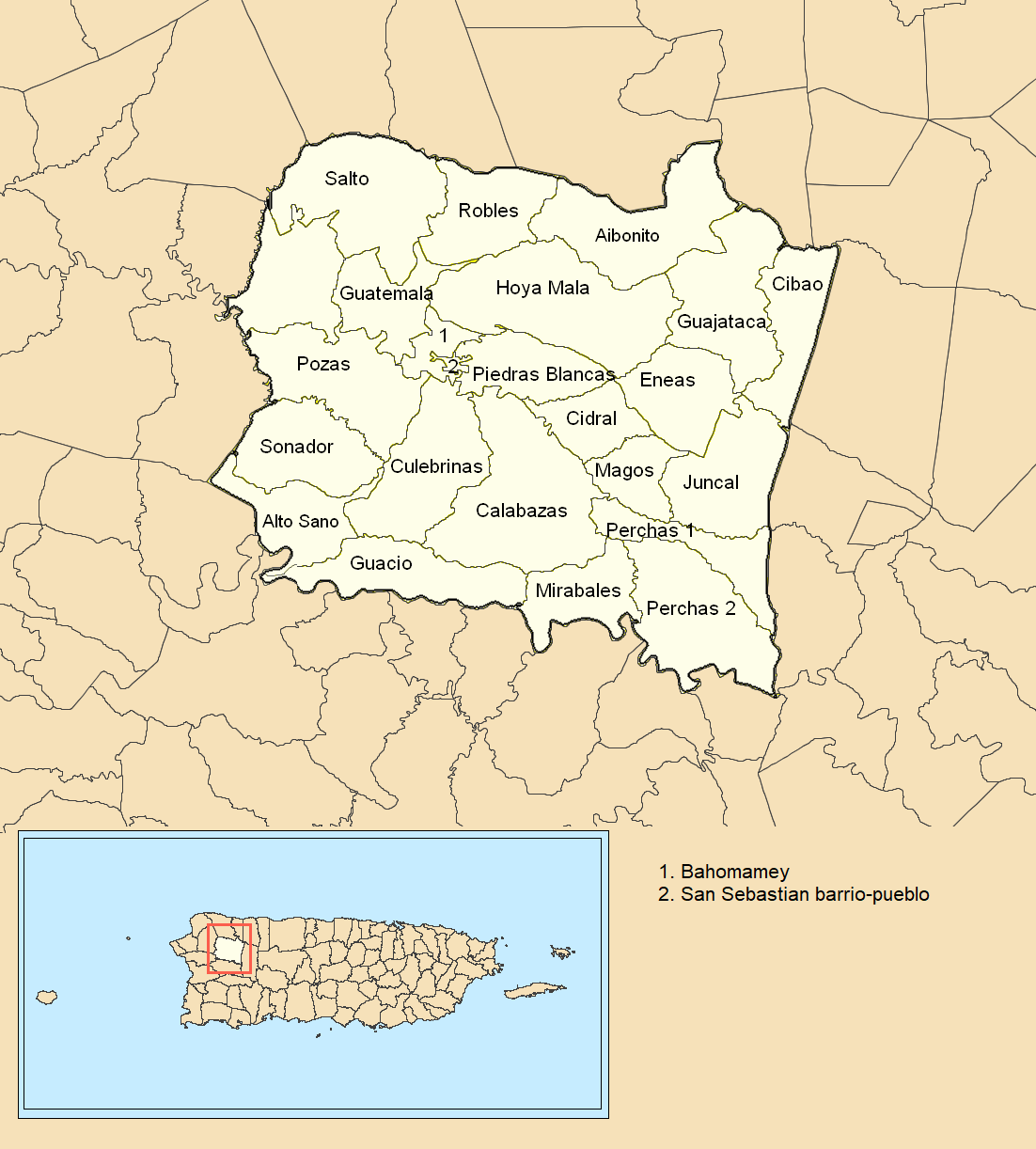
Subdivisions of San Sebastián

San Sebastián is on the northwest.

=== Water features ===
- Guajataca Lake
- Río Grande de Añasco
- Río Culebrinas
- Río Guajataca

=== Barrios ===
Like all municipalities of Puerto Rico, San Sebastián is subdivided into barrios. The municipal buildings, central square and large Catholic church are located in a barrio referred to as "el pueblo".

1. Aibonito
2. Alto Sano
3. Bahomamey
4. Calabazas
5. Cibao
6. Cidral
7. Culebrinas
8. Eneas
9. Guacio
10. Guajataca
11. Guatemala
12. Hato Arriba
13. Hoya Mala
14. Juncal
15. Magos
16. Mirabales
17. Perchas 1
18. Perchas 2
19. Piedras Blancas
20. Pozas
21. Robles
22. Salto
23. San Sebastián barrio-pueblo
24. Sonador

=== Sectors ===
Barrios (which are like minor civil divisions) are further subdivided into smaller areas called sectores (sectors in English). The types of sectores may vary, from normally sector, to urbanización, to reparto, to barriada, to residencial, among others.

=== Special Communities ===
Comunidades Especiales de Puerto Rico (Special Communities of Puerto Rico) are marginalized communities whose citizens are experiencing a certain amount of social exclusion. A map shows these communities occur in nearly every municipality of the commonwealth. Of the 742 places that were on the list in 2014, the following barrios, communities, sectors, or neighborhoods were in San Sebastián: Guació barrio, Boquerón, Chinto Rodón, Estalingrado, Paralelo 38, Parcelas Perchas II, Pueblo Nuevo, and Tablas Astilla.

== Demographics ==
Historical population
Census	Pop.	Note	%±
1900	16,412		—
1910	18,904		15.2%
1920	22,049		16.6%
1930	25,691		16.5%
1940	30,266		17.8%
1950	35,376		16.9%
1960	33,451		−5.4%
1970	30,157		−9.8%
1980	35,690		18.3%
1990	38,799		8.7%
2000	44,204		13.9%
2010	42,430		−4.0%
2020	39,345		−7.3%
2025 (est.)	39,019	▼	−0.8%
1899 (shown as 1900) 1910–1930; 1930–1950 1960–2000 2010 2020

== Tourism ==
=== Landmarks and places of interest ===
Established in 2016 is the Veredas Sports Complex in barrio Guatemala. The complex which consists of a modern skate park, a sand volleyball court, a zipline with four stations, a climbing and rappelling wall, an outdoor gym, a rope bridge, basketball and tennis courts, and walking paths, is set within an urban forest of about six thousand trees. Hacienda La Fe, an agriculture museum is located at the complex. Other landmarks and places of interest in this municipality include:

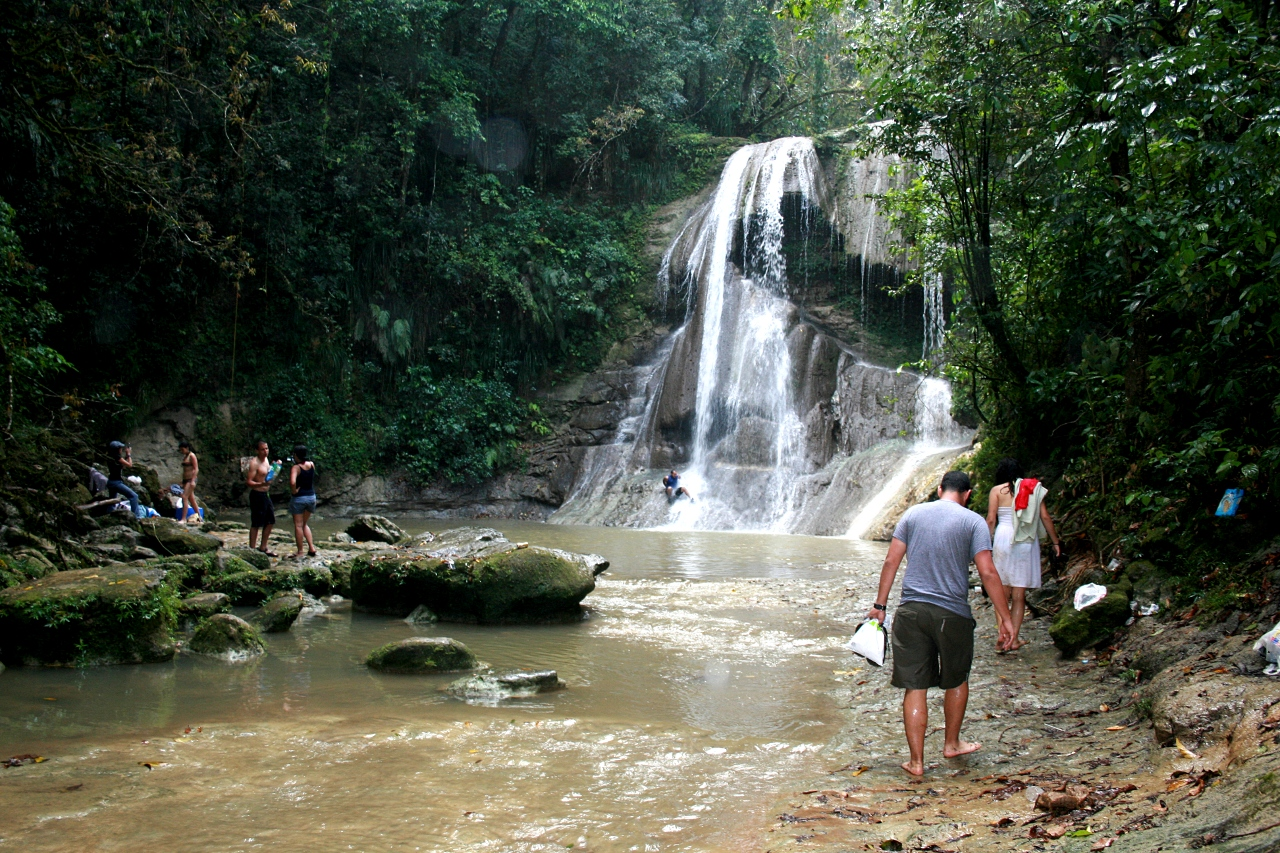
People at Gozalandia Falls in San Sebastián

The Robles Waterfall (located within Gozalandia) is a local favorite, although it can be unsafe.

Church of Saint Sebastian the Martyr on the US National Register of Historic Places, is located in the Pueblo of San Sebastián.

There is a farmer's market held every Friday at the Centro Agropecuario that sells local agriculture as well as souvenirs, for tourists.

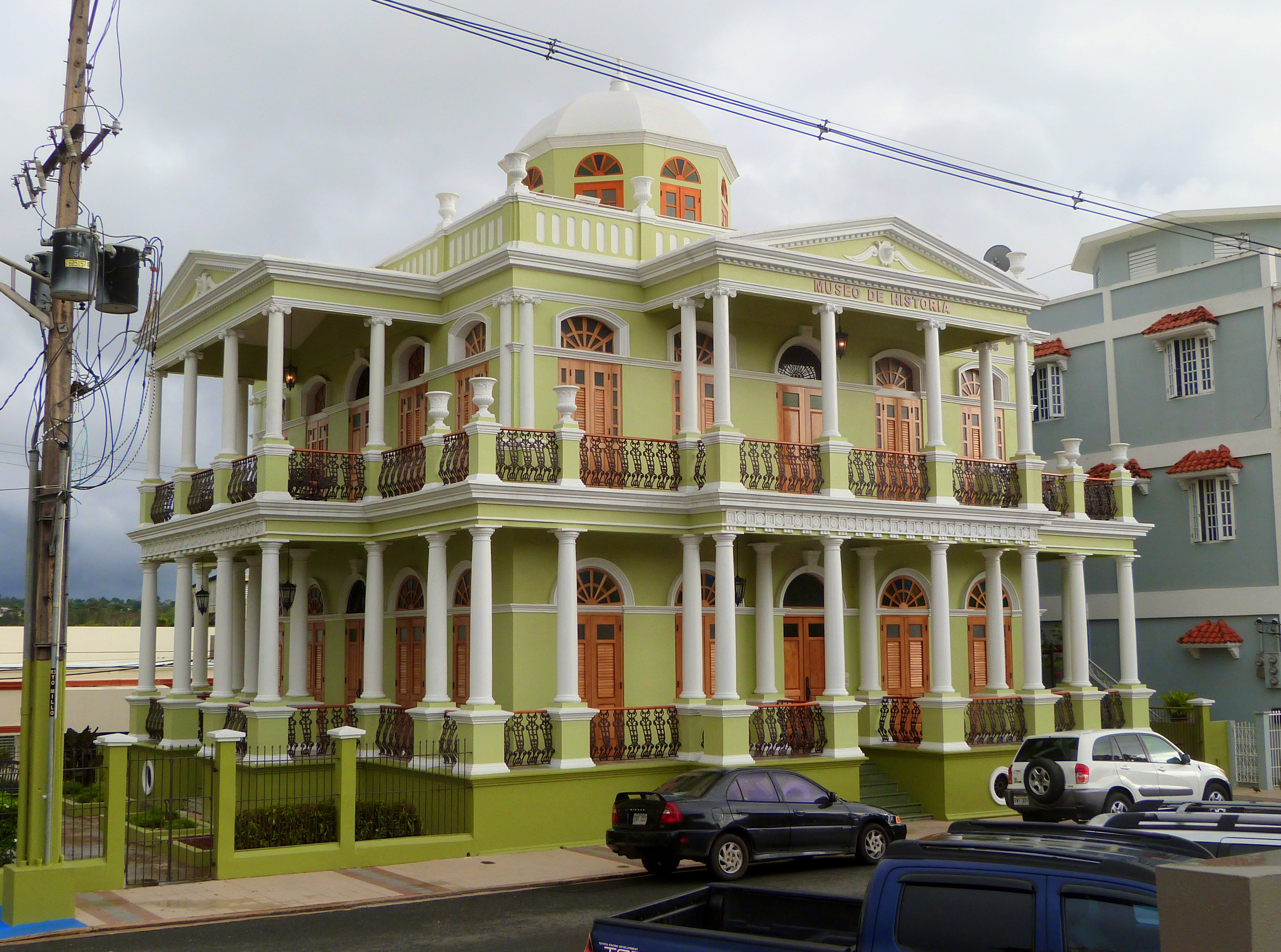
The Casa de Doña Bisa Museum

The Casa de Doña Bisa Museum located across from the main square in downtown features information on what life was like in the early 20th century.

Other sites include:

- Guajataca Lake
- Luis Aymat Cardona Coliseum
- Collazo Waterfall
- Hacienda El Jibarito
- Hacienda La Fe
- Juan Jose "Titi" Beniquez Stadium
- Luis Muñoz Marin Ground
- Guajataka Scout Reservation

== Economy ==
=== Agriculture ===
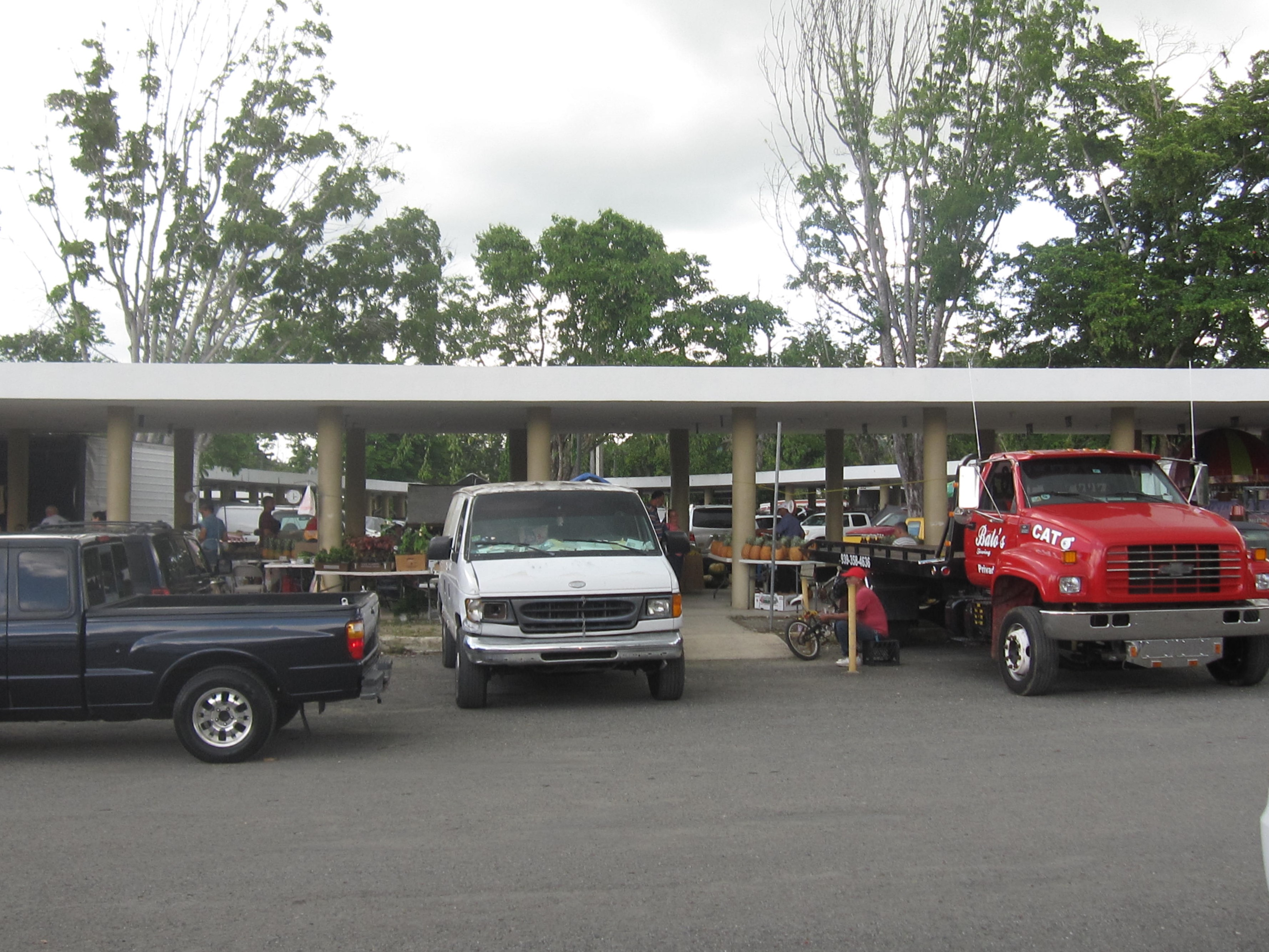
Plaza Agropecuaria hosts a farmer's market on Fridays

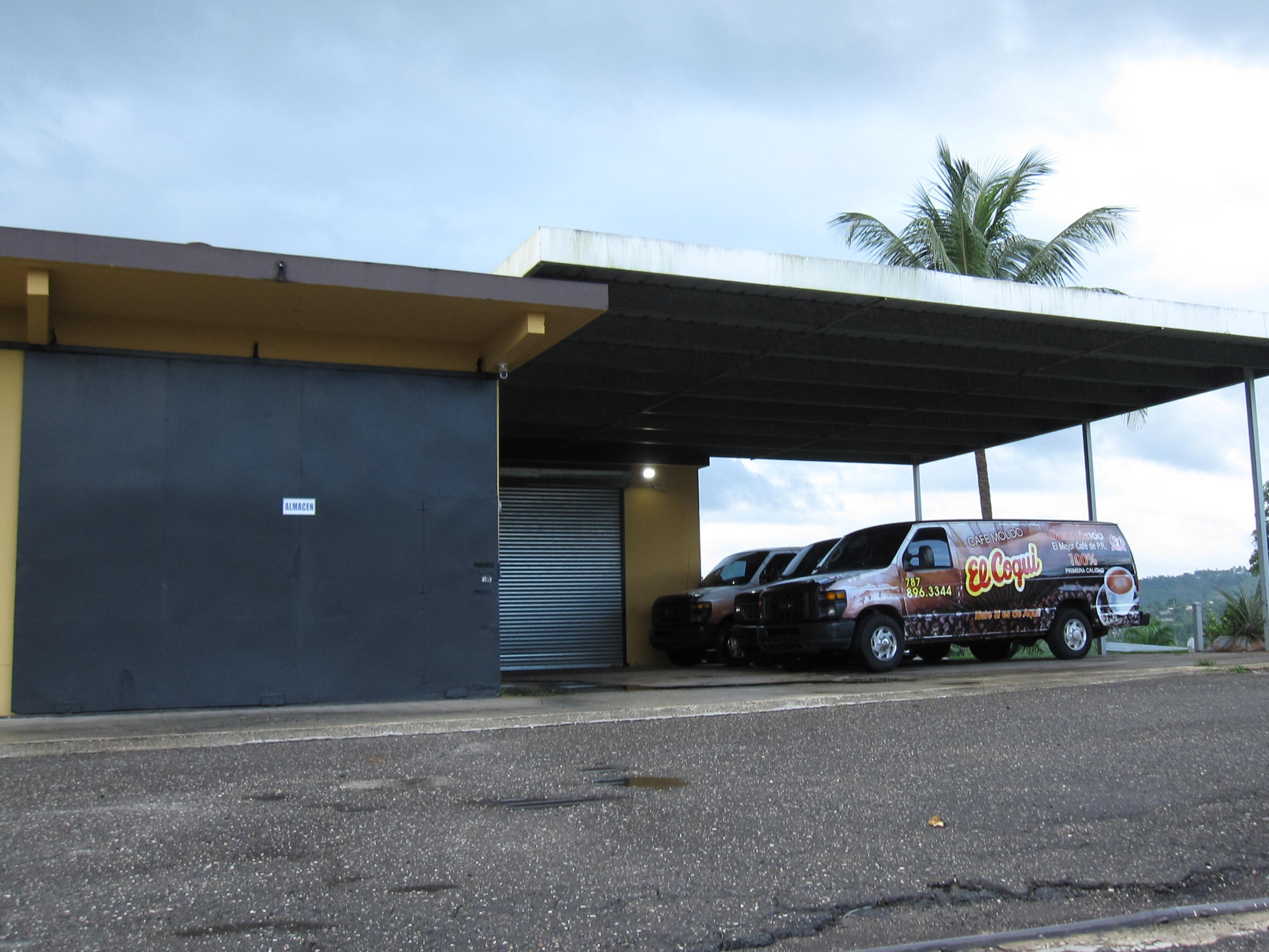
Café El Coquí plant in Perchas I

San Sebastián is a producer of coffee, fruits, and has dairy farms. There is a coffee production plant called El Coquí located in Perchas 1, a barrio of San Sebastián.

== Government ==
All municipalities in Puerto Rico are administered by a mayor, elected every four years. The current mayor of San Sebastián is Eladio "Layito" Cardona Quiles, of the Popular Democratic Party (PPD). He was first elected at the 2024 general elections.

The city belongs to the Puerto Rico Senatorial district IV, which is represented by two Senators. In 2024, Jeison Rosa and Karen Michelle Román Rodríguez, both from the New Progressive Party (PNP), were elected as District Senators.

== Transportation ==
There are 30 bridges in San Sebastian.

There is also an air strip in San Sebastian, near Culebrinas River, which is visible on Google Earth. The air strip is for the use of RC (radio-controlled) airplanes.

== Culture ==
In the town is a Fine Arts and Convention Center called Centro de Convenciones y Bellas Artes, which was in the last phase of its construction, as of February 2019.

=== Festivals and events ===
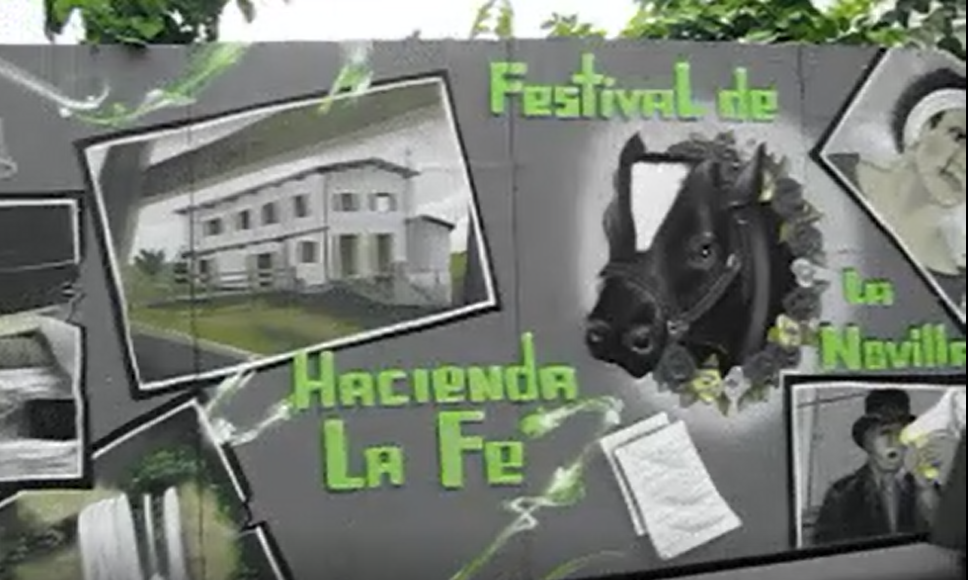
Heifer Festival and Hacienda La Fe mural in San Sebastián in 2019

San Sebastián celebrates its patron saint festival in January. The Fiestas Patronales de San Sebastián is a religious and cultural celebration that generally features parades, games, artisans, amusement rides, regional food, and live entertainment.

The San Sebastián Heifer Festival (Spanish: Festival de la Novilla), celebrated every year on the first Sunday during the patron saint festival, is San Sebastián's largest festival attracting thousands of people. The celebration features carnival rides, the diverse music of Puerto Rico, cows decorated with flowers, floats and Puerto Rican cuisine. In January 2016, the town celebrated its 40th Heifer festival.

Other festivals and events celebrated in San Sebastián include:

- Three Kings Day Festival – January
- Children's Festival – January
- Hammock Festival – July
- Lighting of the Christmas tree – November
- Cultural Evenings – third Thursday of the month
- Farmers' market – every Friday

== Sports ==
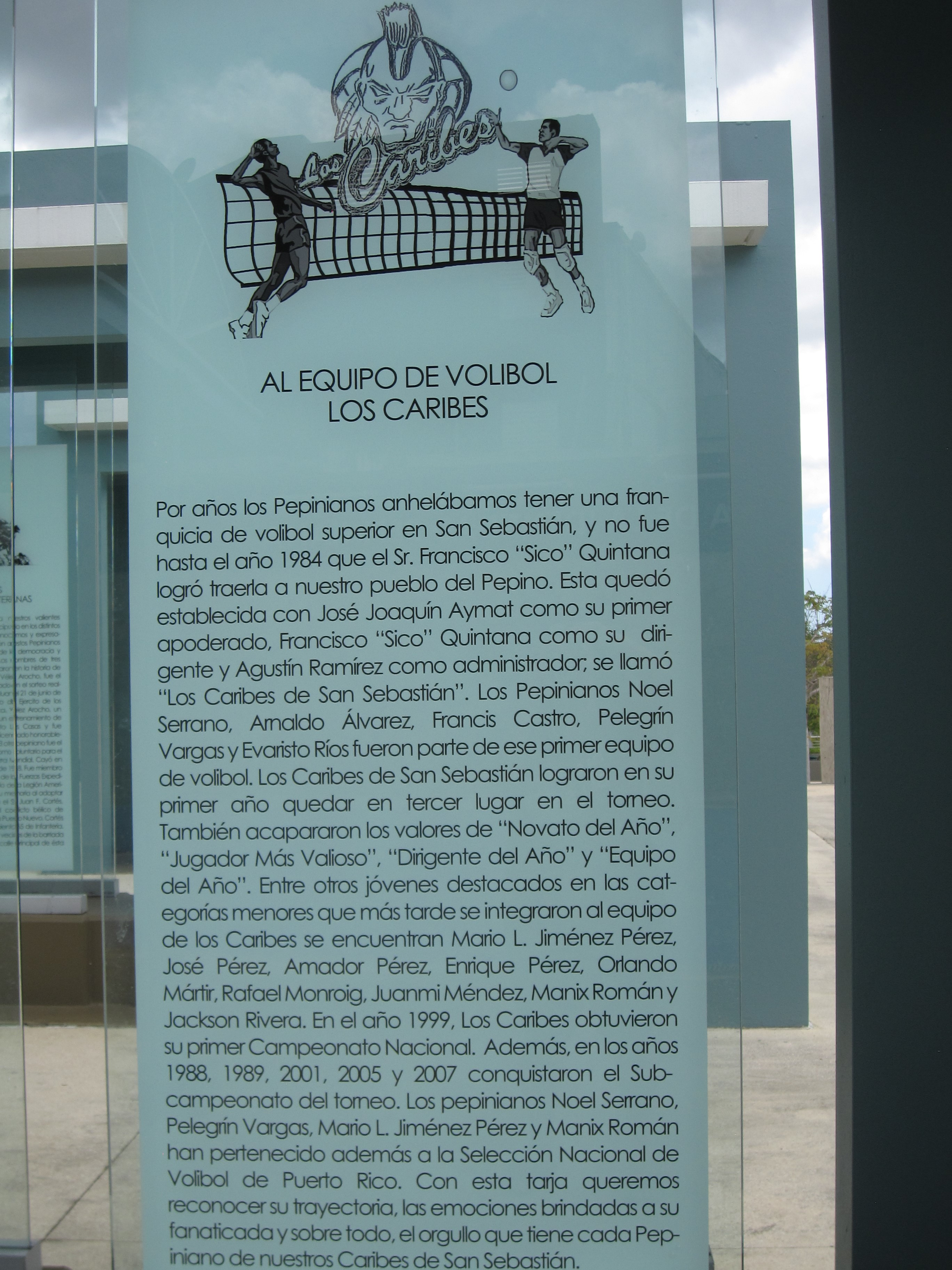
Plaque honoring Los Caribes

The Luis Aymat Cardona Coliseum is where the Los Caribes volleyball team plays their games.

In amateur baseball or Double AA baseball, the city is represented by the Patrulleros de San Sebastián, who play at the Juan Jose "Titi" Beniquez Stadium and became champions of the Northwest area in 2019.

== Symbols ==
The municipio has an official flag and coat of arms.

=== Flag ===
It consists of a rectangular flag of the usual proportions, crossed by a white waved band that separates its red superior part from the inferior one, which is green.

=== Coat of arms ===
The Mountains: With silver-plated borders, represent the characteristic mountains under which the vegetable namesake of the town grow (cucumbers) The Crown: Is the heraldic standard used to identify towns, villas and cities. The sugar cane and coffee ranches represent main agricultural products.

== Notable people ==
- Juan Beníquez, a former center fielder in Major League Baseball
- Ángel Mislan, (1862–1911) musician and composer of danzas "Sara" and "Tu y Yo".
- Nilita Vientós Gastón, (1903–1989) an educator, writer and journalist and the first woman president of the Puerto Rican Athenaeum.
- Luis V. Gutiérrez, first Latino to be elected to Congress from the Midwest.
- Sophy, singer
- Oscar Lopez Rivera, political prisoner.
- Altemio Sanchez, Rapist and Serial Killer
- Luz Odilia Font, Telenovela, theater and film actress
- Abimelec Torres, Contestant on Idol Puerto Rico
- Estefania Soto Torres, Miss Universe Puerto Rico 2020 (Placed Top 10 at Miss Universe 2020)

== Gallery ==
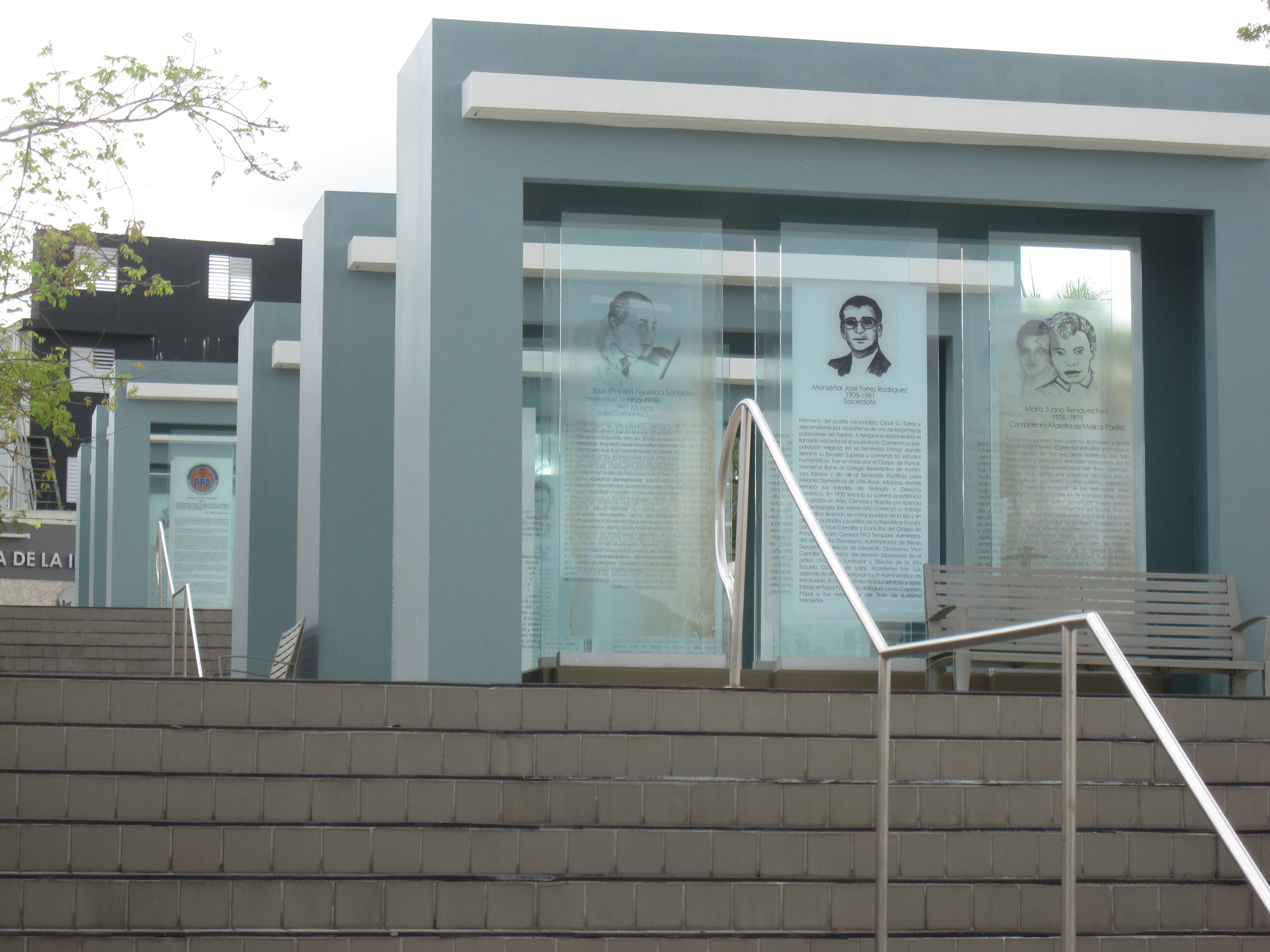
Plaza de la Identidad Pepiniana

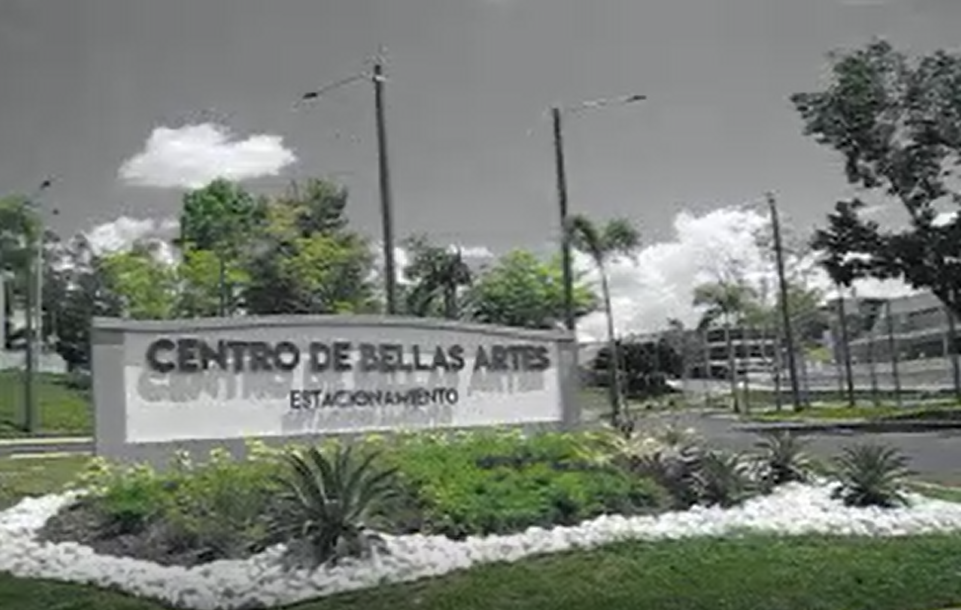
Centro de Bellas Artes

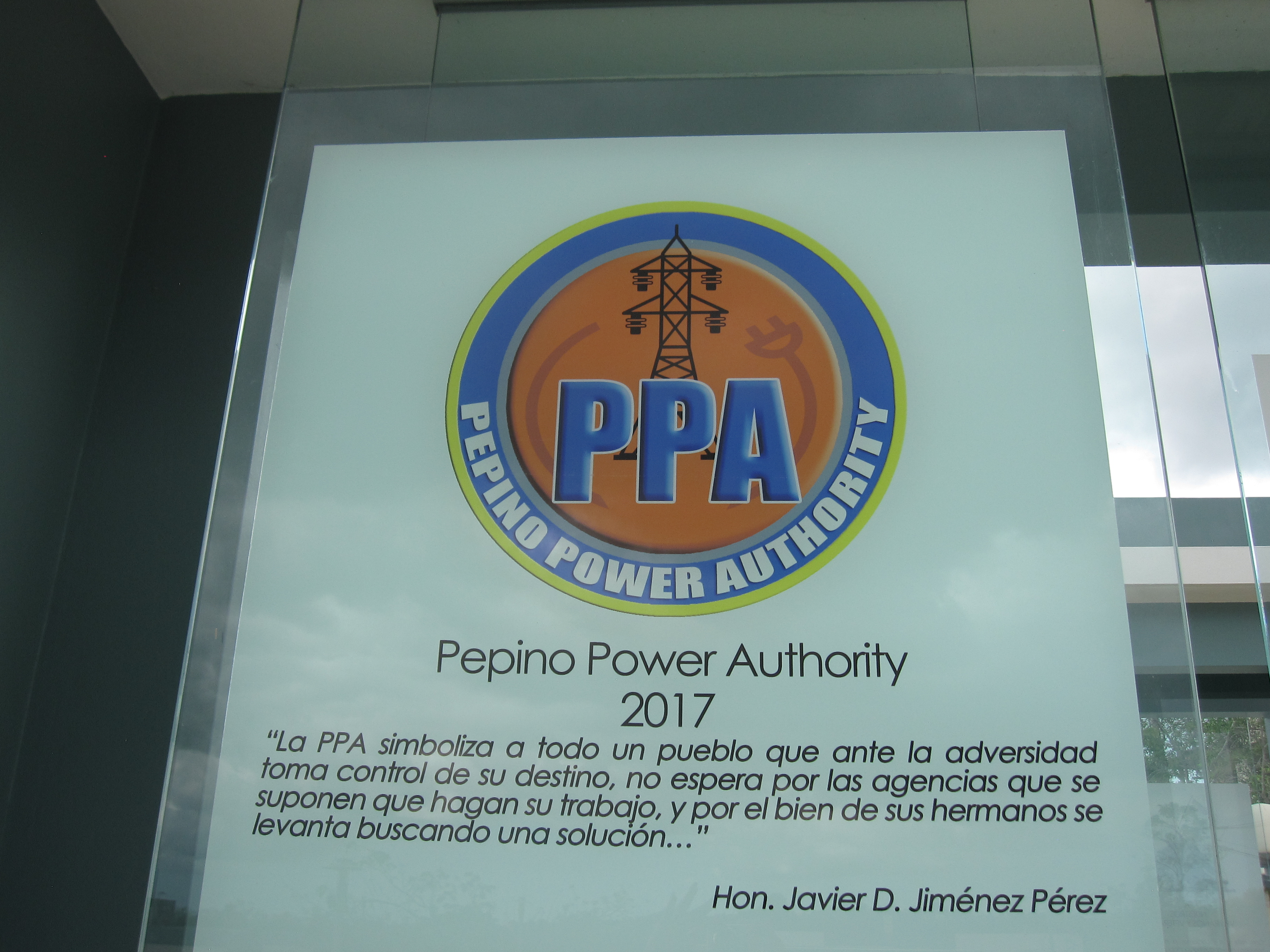
Pepino Power Authority in Plaza de la Identidad Pepiniana

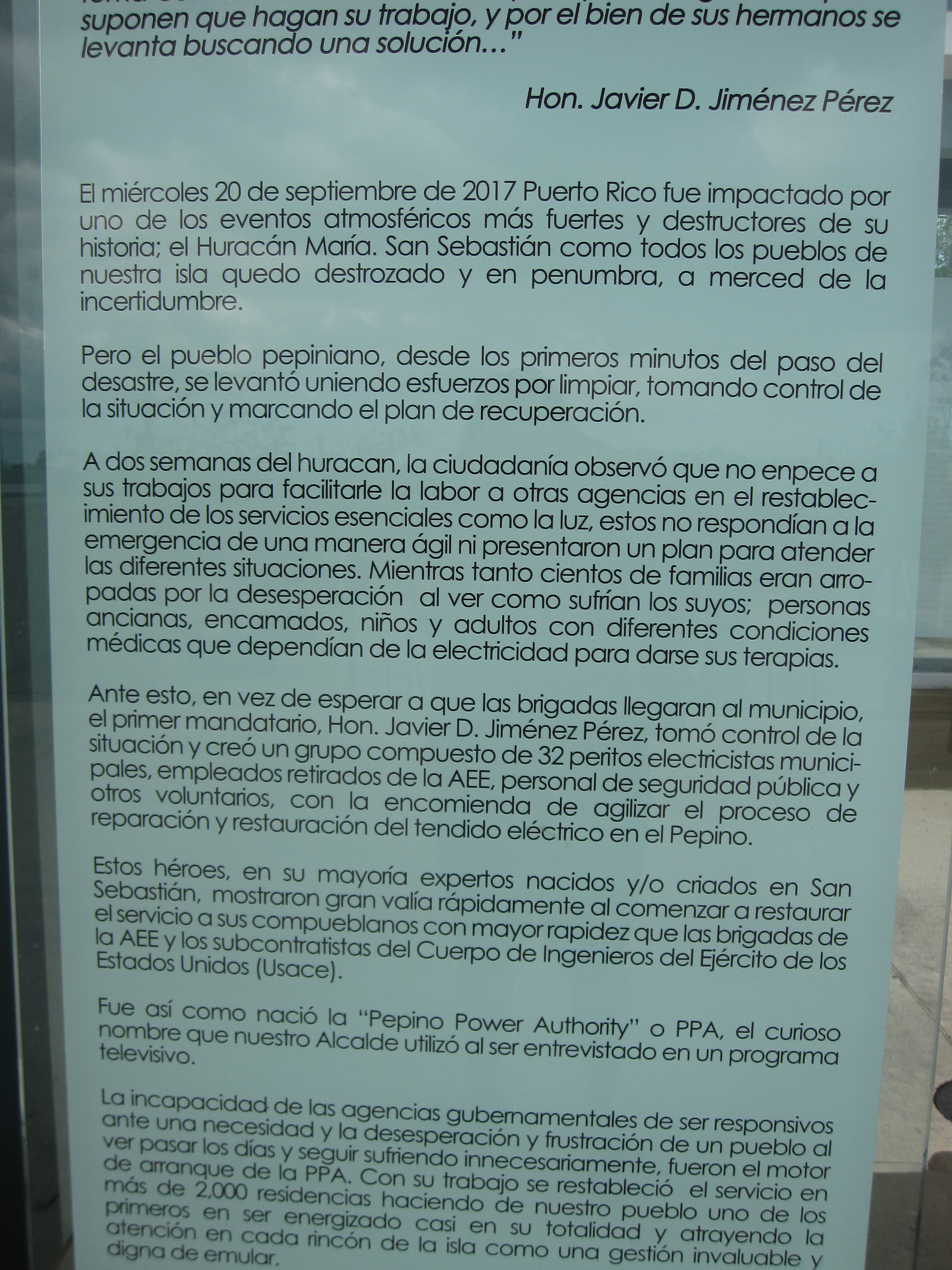
Monument honoring Pepino Power Authority in Plaza de la Identidad

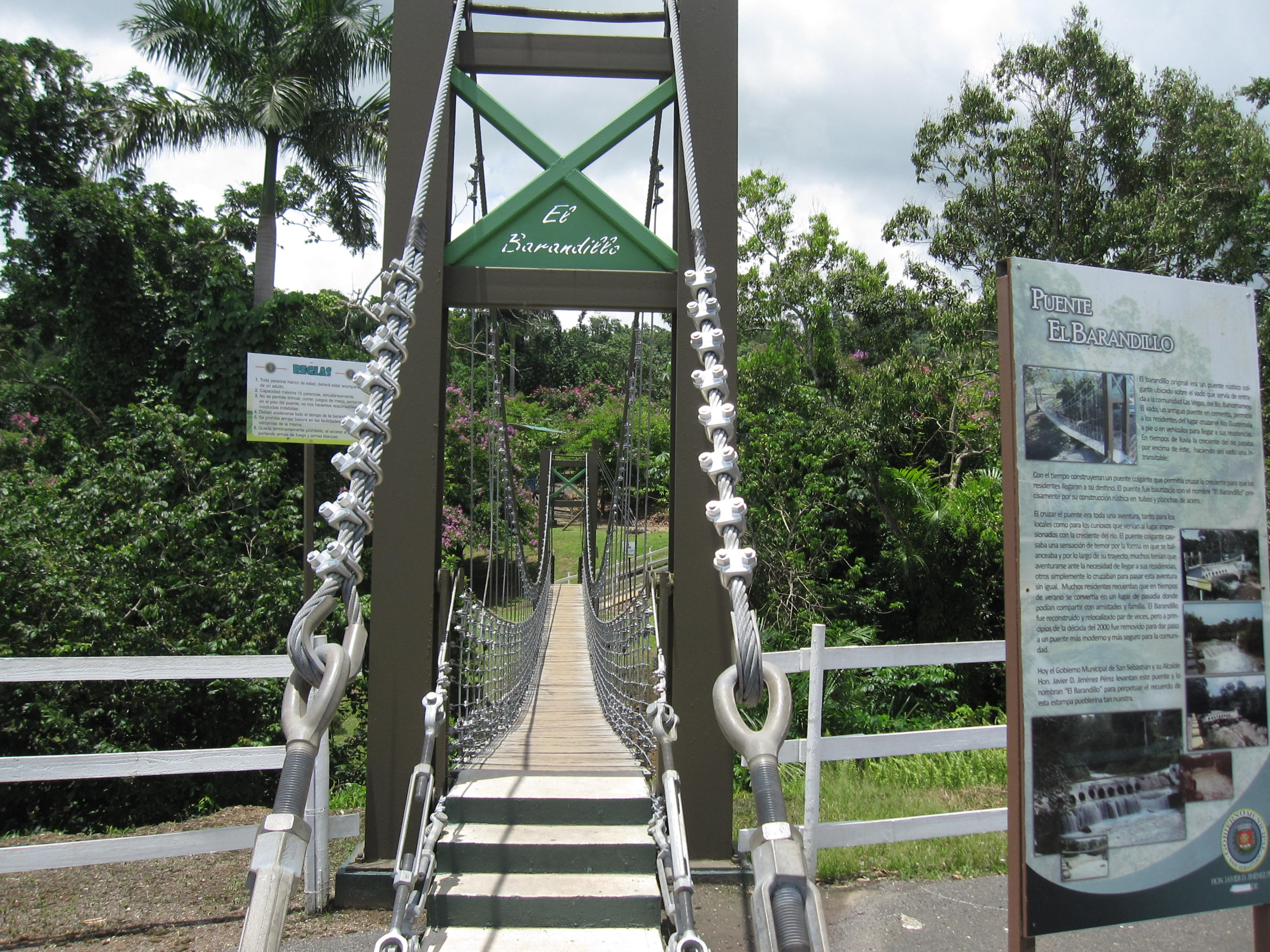
Rope bridge at Veredas Complejo Deportivo

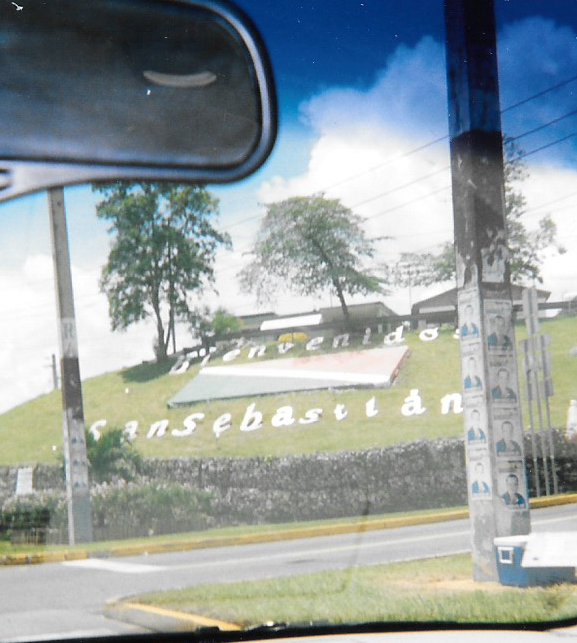
Welcome to San Sebastián sign

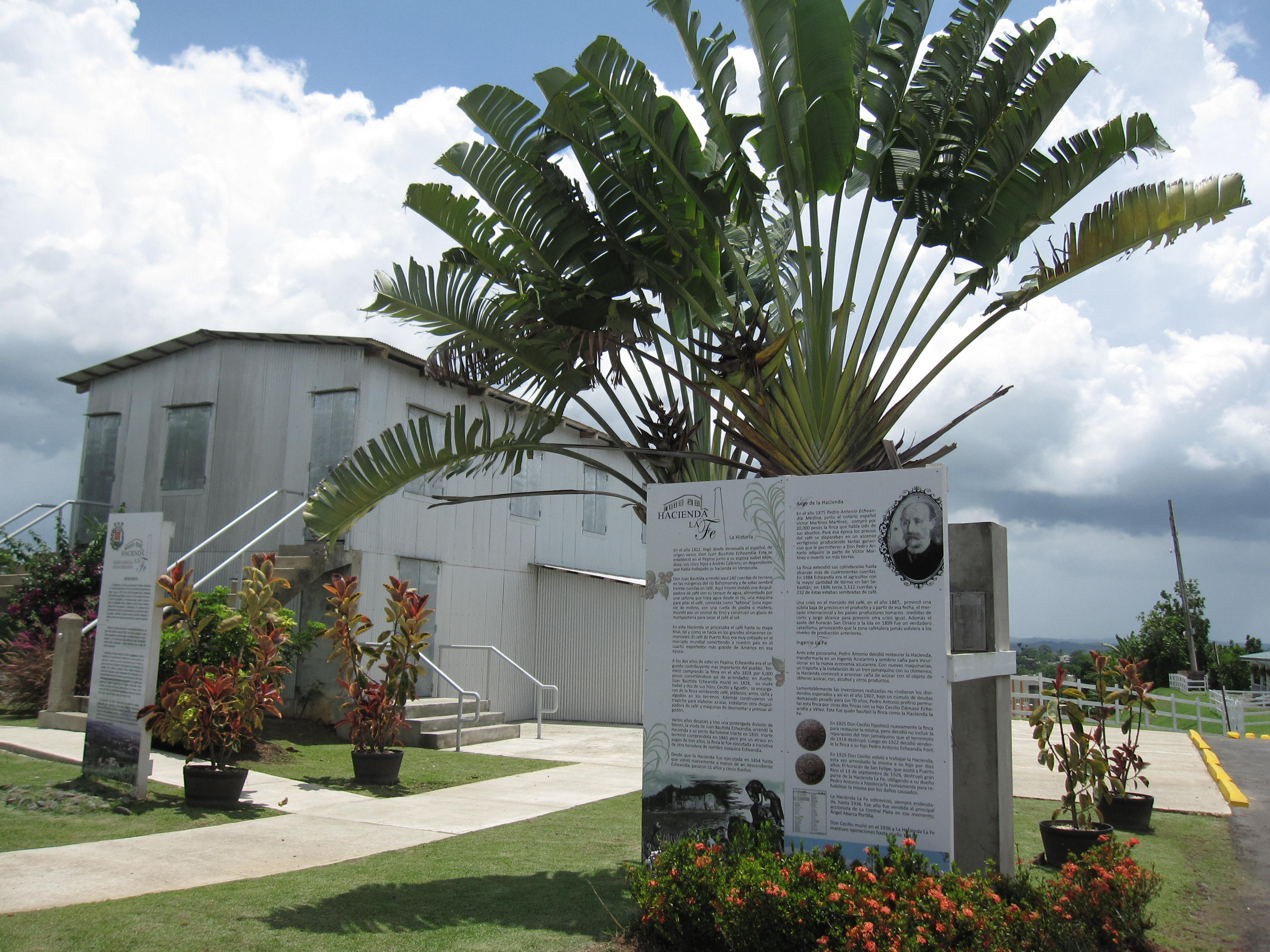
The Hacienda La Fe museum is at the Veredas Sports Complex

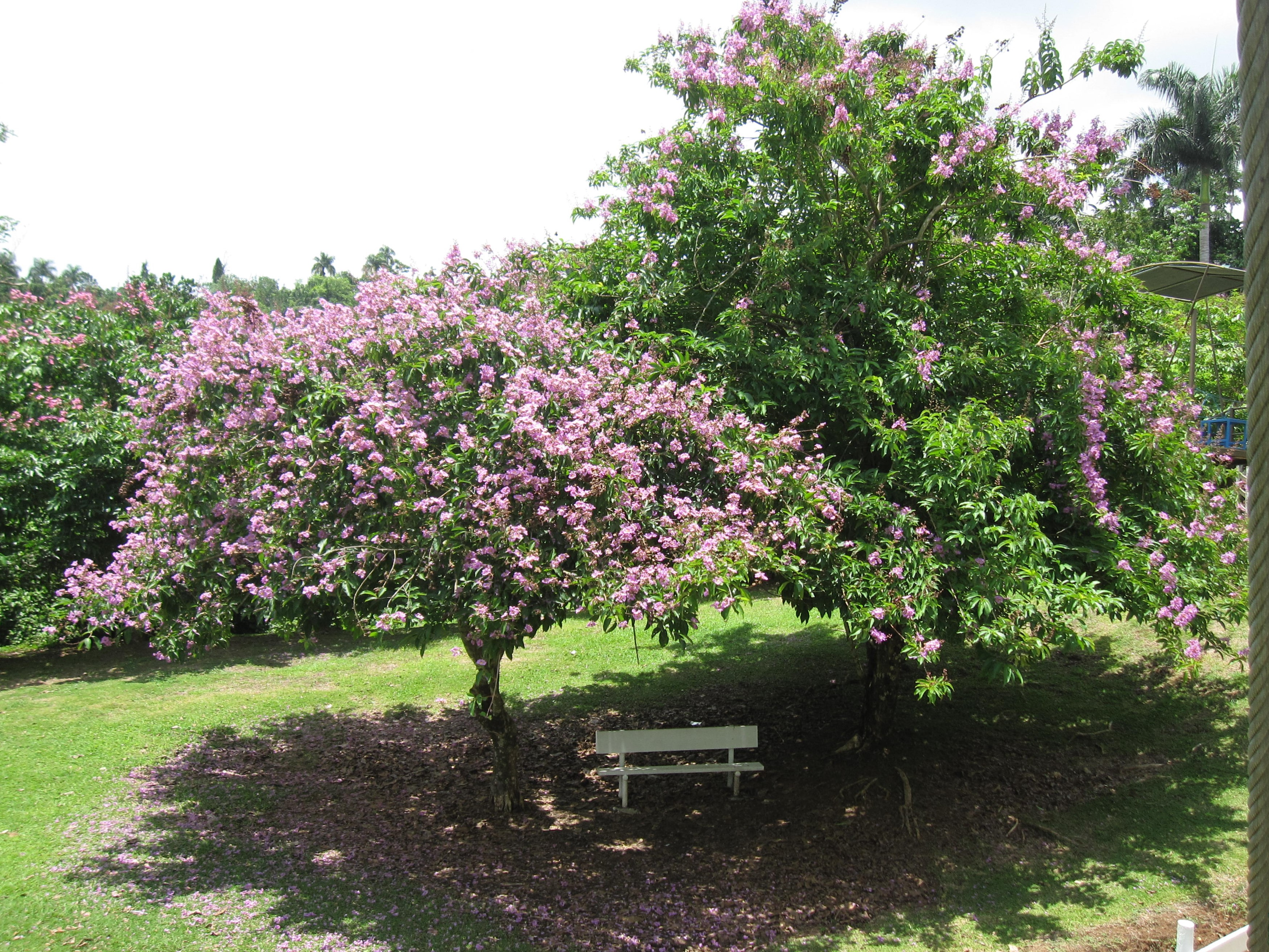
Trees at Veredas Complejo

== See also ==
- List of Puerto Ricans
- History of Puerto Rico
- Did you know-Puerto Rico?
