= Robles, San Sebastián, Puerto Rico =

Barrio of Puerto Rico

Robles
- Barrio
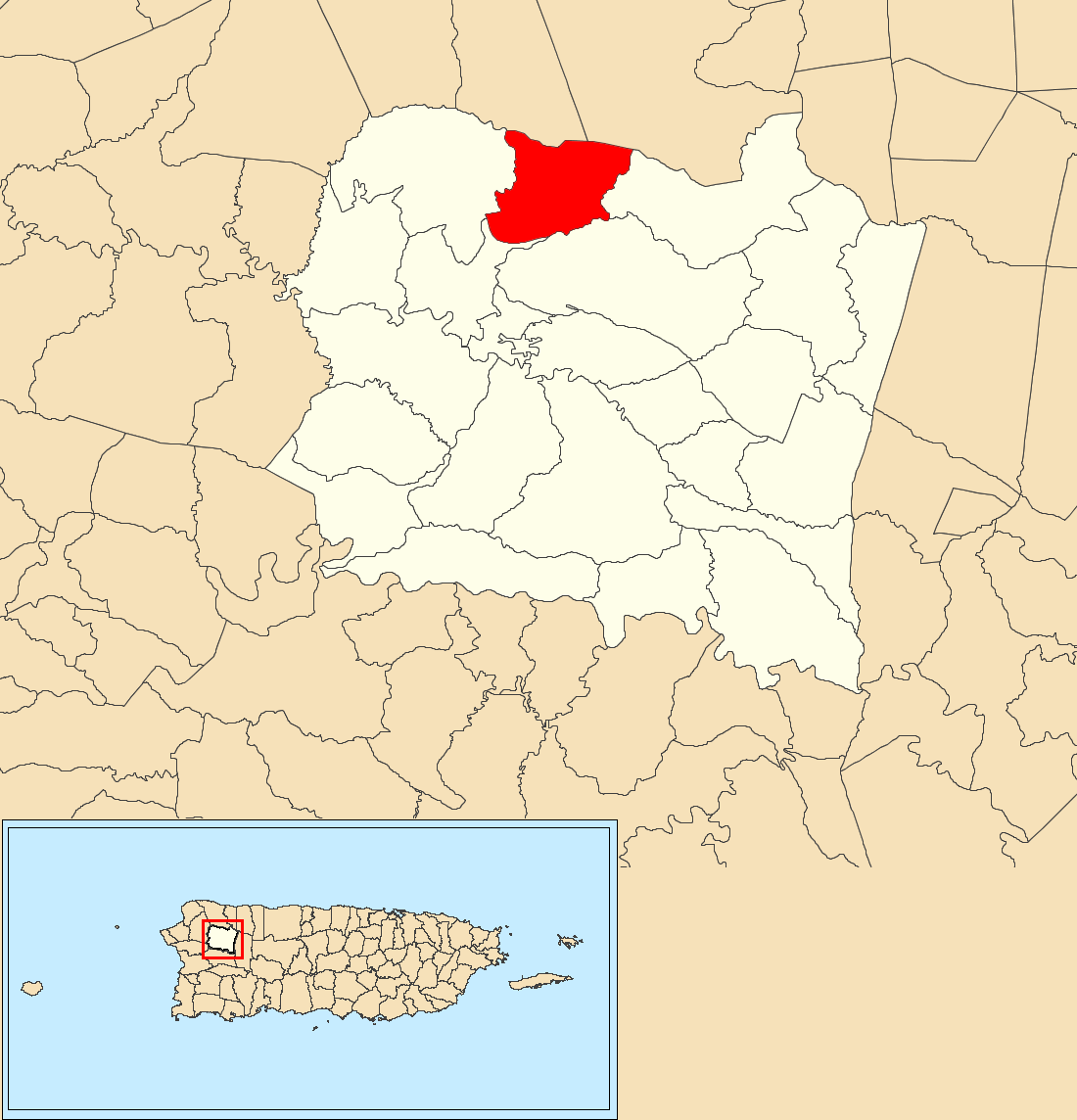
- Location of Robles within the municipality of San Sebastián shown in red

- Location of Puerto Rico
- Coordinates: 18°22′30″N 66°58′55″W
- Commonwealth: Puerto Rico
- Municipality: San Sebastián

Area
  - Total: 2.74 sq mi (7.1 km^{2})
  - Land: 2.74 sq mi (7.1 km^{2})
  - Water: 0 sq mi (0 km^{2})
- Elevation: 571 ft (174 m)

Population (2010)
  - Total: 1,697
  - Density: 619.3/sq mi (239.1/km^{2})
- Source: 2010 Census
- Time zone: UTC−4 (AST)

Robles is a barrio in the municipality of San Sebastián, Puerto Rico. Its population in 2010 was 1,697.

== History ==
Robles was in Spain's gazetteers until Puerto Rico was ceded by Spain in the aftermath of the Spanish–American War under the terms of the Treaty of Paris of 1898 and became an unincorporated territory of the United States. In 1899, the United States Department of War conducted a census of Puerto Rico finding that the combined population of Robles and Salto barrios was 1,646.

Historical population
Census	Pop.	Note	%±
1910	578		—
1920	774		33.9%
1930	1,093		41.2%
1940	1,090		−0.3%
1950	1,251		14.8%
1960	925		−26.1%
1970	838		−9.4%
1980	1,029		22.8%
1990	1,254		21.9%
2000	1,595		27.2%
2010	1,697		6.4%
U.S. Decennial Census; 1900 (N/A) 1910-1930; 1930-1950 1980-2000 2010

== Sectors ==
Barrios (which are, in contemporary times, roughly comparable to minor civil divisions) in turn are further subdivided into smaller local populated place areas/units called sectores (sectors in English). The types of sectores may vary, from normally sector to urbanización to reparto to barriada to residencial, among others.

The following sectors are in Robles barrio:

Carretera 446, Carretera 447, Carretera 4446, Sector Cuatro Calles, Sector El Paraíso, Sector Farel Velázquez, Sector Genove González, Sector La Conquista, Sector Las Piedras, Sector Lito Ramos, Sector Pedro Lisojo, Sector Peña, Sector Pochín Serrano, Sector Ricardo Morales, and Urbanización Antonio Muñiz.

== See also ==
- List of communities in Puerto Rico
- List of barrios and sectors of San Sebastián, Puerto Rico
