= Iglesia San Sebastián Mártir =

Historic church in San Sebastián, Puerto Rico

- Church San Sebastián Mártir of San Sebastián
- U.S. National Register of Historic Places
- Puerto Rico Historic Sites and Zones
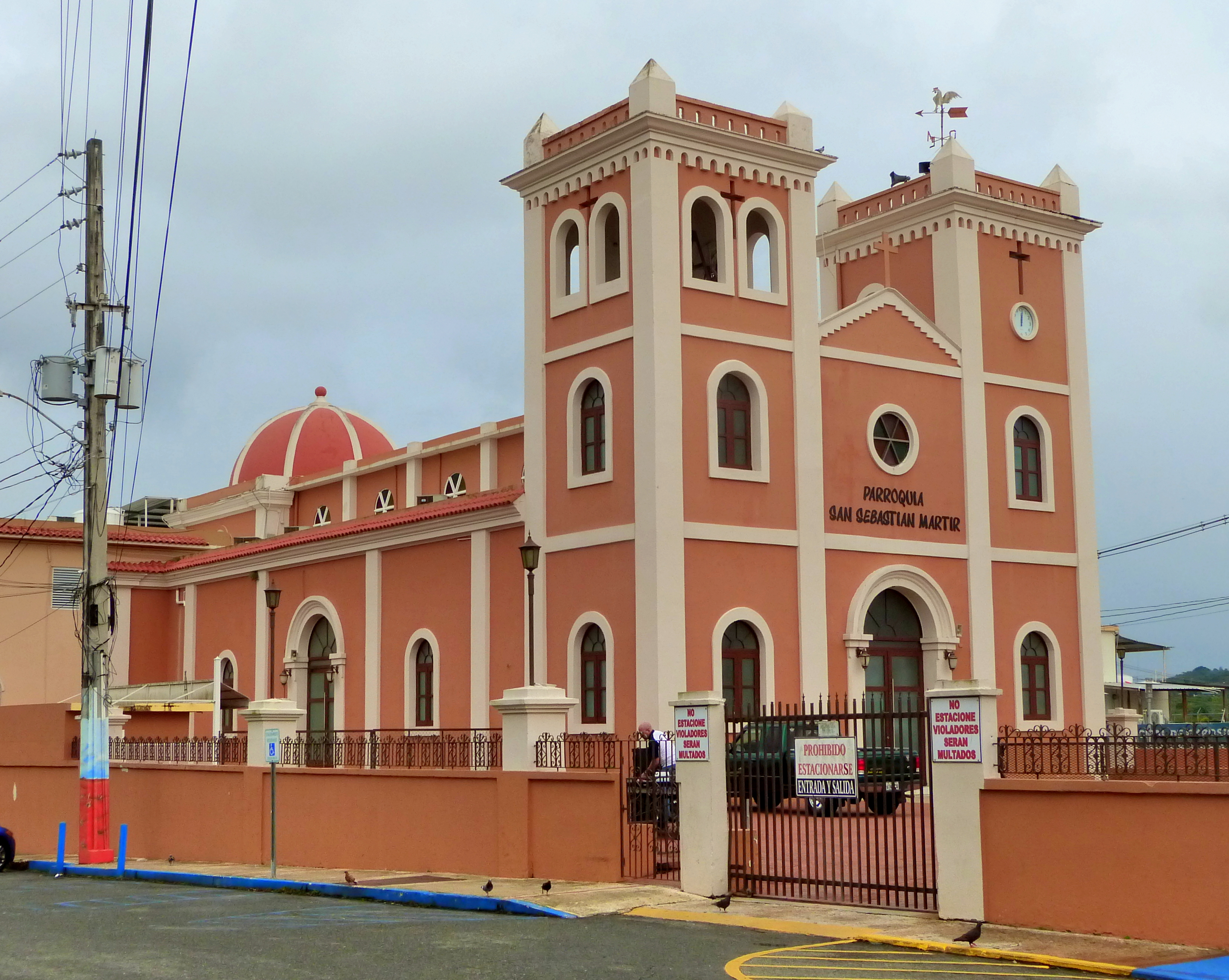
- Iglesia San Sebastián Mártir in 2017

- Location within Puerto Rico Location within the Caribbean
- Location: Severo Arana Street, Town Plaza; San Sebastián, Puerto Rico
- Coordinates: 18°20′12″N 66°59′26″W
- Built: 1895-1897
- Architect: Pedro Cobreros
- MPS: Historic Churches of Puerto Rico MPS
- NRHP reference No.: 84003132
- RNSZH No.: 2000-(RC)-22-JP-SH

Significant dates
- Added to NRHP: September 18, 1984
- Designated RNSZH: March 15, 2001

The Iglesia San Sebastián Mártir (English: Church of Saint Sebastian the Martyr) in the plaza in San Sebastián, Puerto Rico was completed in 1897. It was listed on the U.S. National Register of Historic Places in 1984, and on the Puerto Rico Register of Historic Sites and Zones in 2001.

It is one of five churches designed by state architect Pedro Cobreros during 1890 to 1896 and completed in 1897 and is "austere, yet noble".

It is one of 31 churches reviewed for listing on the National Register in 1984.
