= Sonador =

Barrio of San Sebastián, Puerto Rico

- Barrio
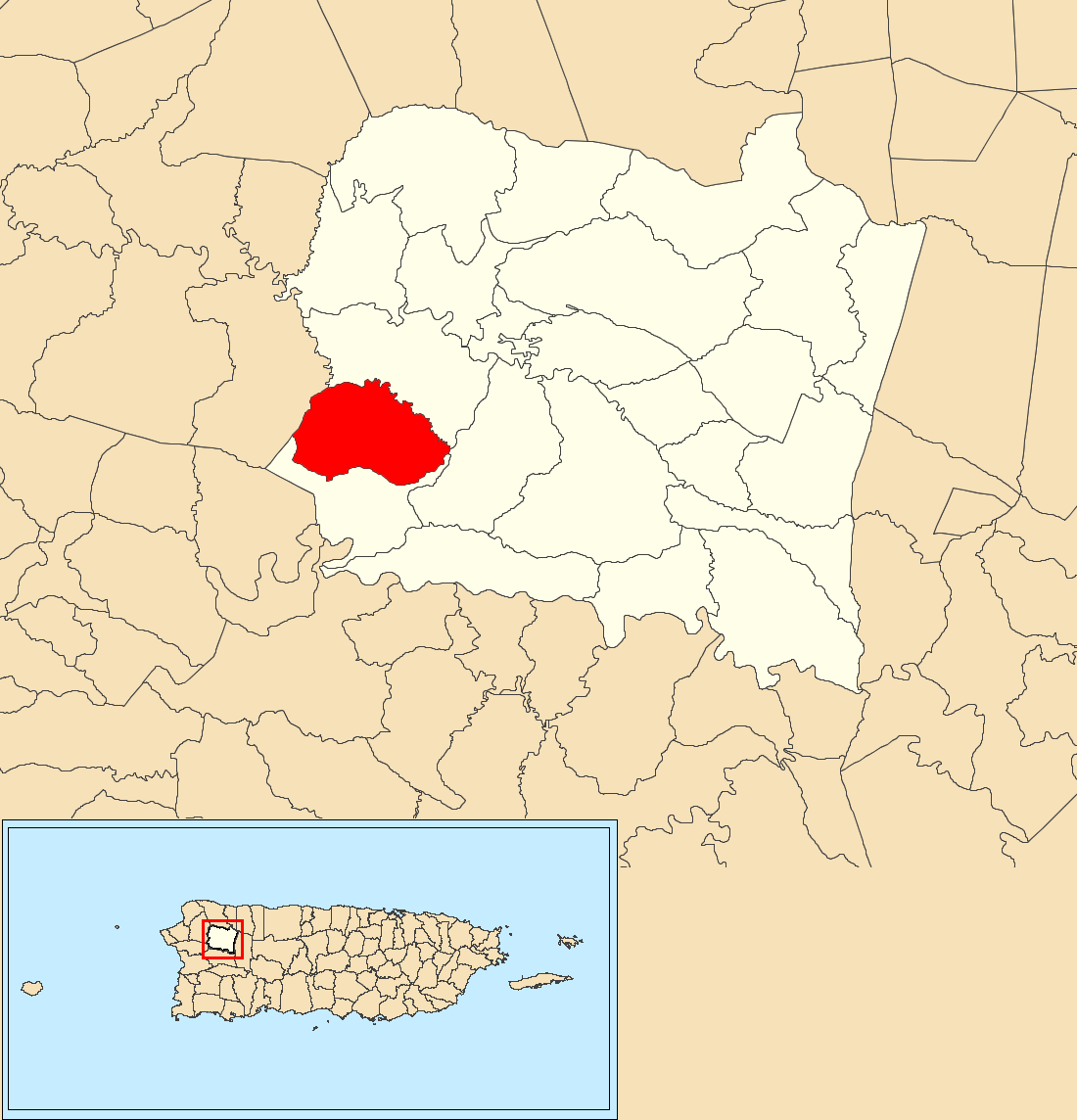
- Location of Sonador within the municipality of San Sebastián shown in red

- Location of Puerto Rico
- Coordinates: 18°18′54″N 67°01′40″W
- Commonwealth: Puerto Rico
- Municipality: San Sebastián

Area
  - Total: 2.95 sq mi (7.6 km^{2})
  - Land: 2.95 sq mi (7.6 km^{2})
  - Water: 0 sq mi (0 km^{2})
- Elevation: 459 ft (140 m)

Population (2010)
  - Total: 1,813
  - Density: 614.6/sq mi (237.3/km^{2})
- Source: 2010 Census
- Time zone: UTC−4 (AST)

Sonador is a barrio in the municipality of San Sebastián, Puerto Rico. Its population in 2010 was 1,813.

== History ==
Sonador was part of Spanish territories until Puerto Rico was ceded by Spain following the Spanish–American War under the terms of the Treaty of Paris of 1898, becoming an unincorporated territory of the United States. In 1899, the United States Department of War conducted a census of Puerto Rico, finding that the combined population of Sonador and Alto Sano barrios was 862.

Historical population
Census	Pop.	Note	%±
1910	548		—
1920	598		9.1%
1930	599		0.2%
1940	845		41.1%
1950	901		6.6%
1960	982		9.0%
1970	773		−21.3%
1980	1,208		56.3%
1990	1,421		17.6%
2000	1,425		0.3%
2010	1,813		27.2%
U.S. Decennial Census; 1900 (N/A) 1910-1930; 1930-1950 1980-2000 2010

== Sectors ==
Barrios (which are, in contemporary times, roughly comparable to minor civil divisions) are further subdivided into smaller local populated place areas called sectores (sectors in English). The types of sectores may vary, including sector, urbanización, reparto, barriada, or residencial, among others.

The following sectors are in Sonador barrio:

Carretera 423, Carretera 497, Parcelas Sonador, Sector Álvarez, Sector Andrés Torres, Sector Berto Vargas, Sector Cruz Montalvo, Sector El Callejón, Sector El Túnel, Sector Entrada Chaín, Sector Gelo Ramos, Sector José Manuel Soto, Sector Julio Nieves, Sector Justo Pérez, Sector La Parada, Sector La Pluma Pública, Sector La Vanguardia, Sector Manolo Quiles, Sector Maximino Soto, Sector Montalvo, Sector Ortiz, Sector Pello Sánchez, Sector Puente Nuevo, Sector Siso Quiles, Sector Tito Bondo, and Urbanización Brisas del Río Sonador.

== See also ==
- List of communities in Puerto Rico
- List of barrios and sectors of San Sebastián, Puerto Rico
