= Guacio =

Barrio of San Sebastián, Puerto Rico

- Barrio
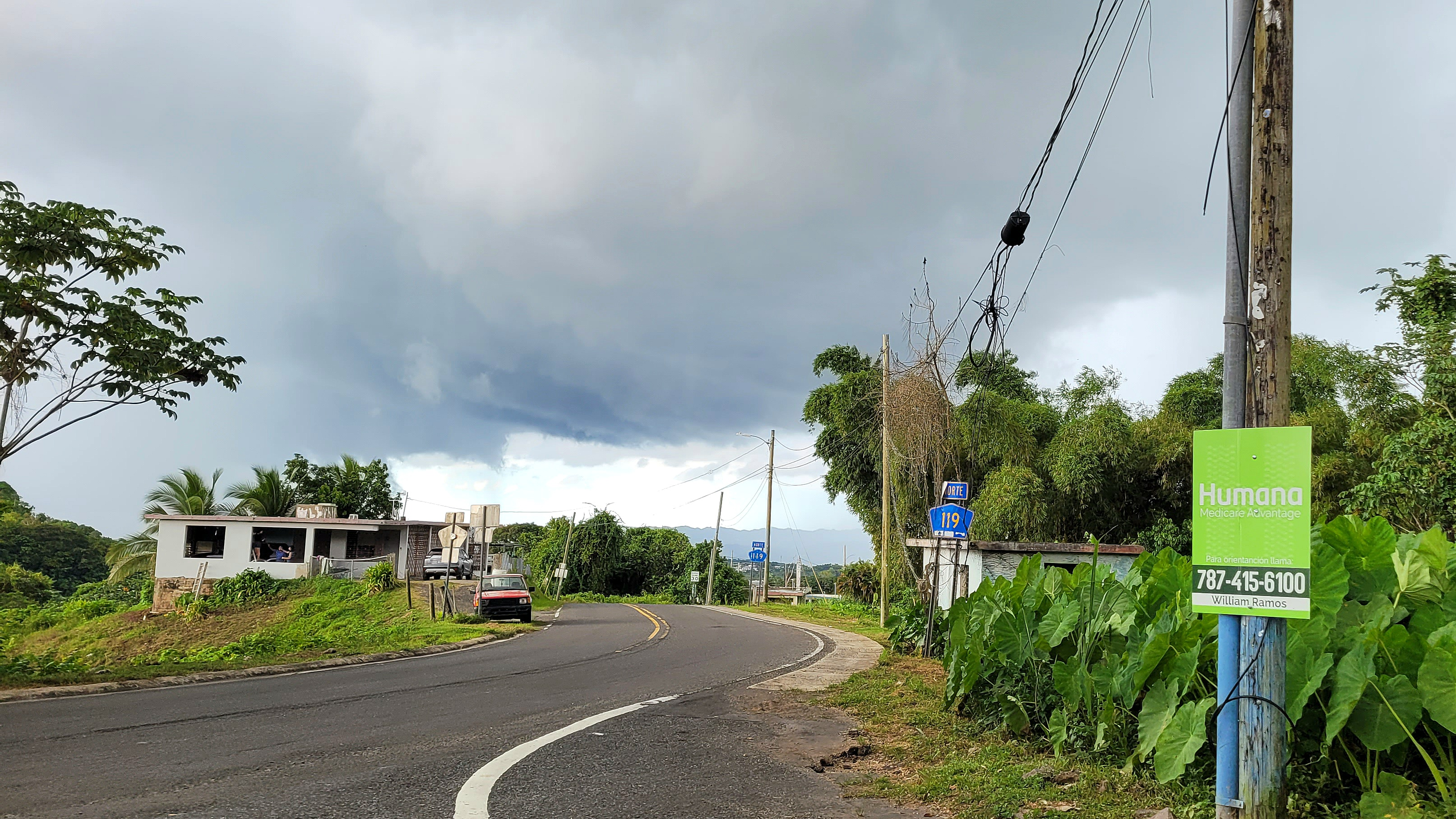
- Puerto Rico Highway 119 between Guacio and Calabazas

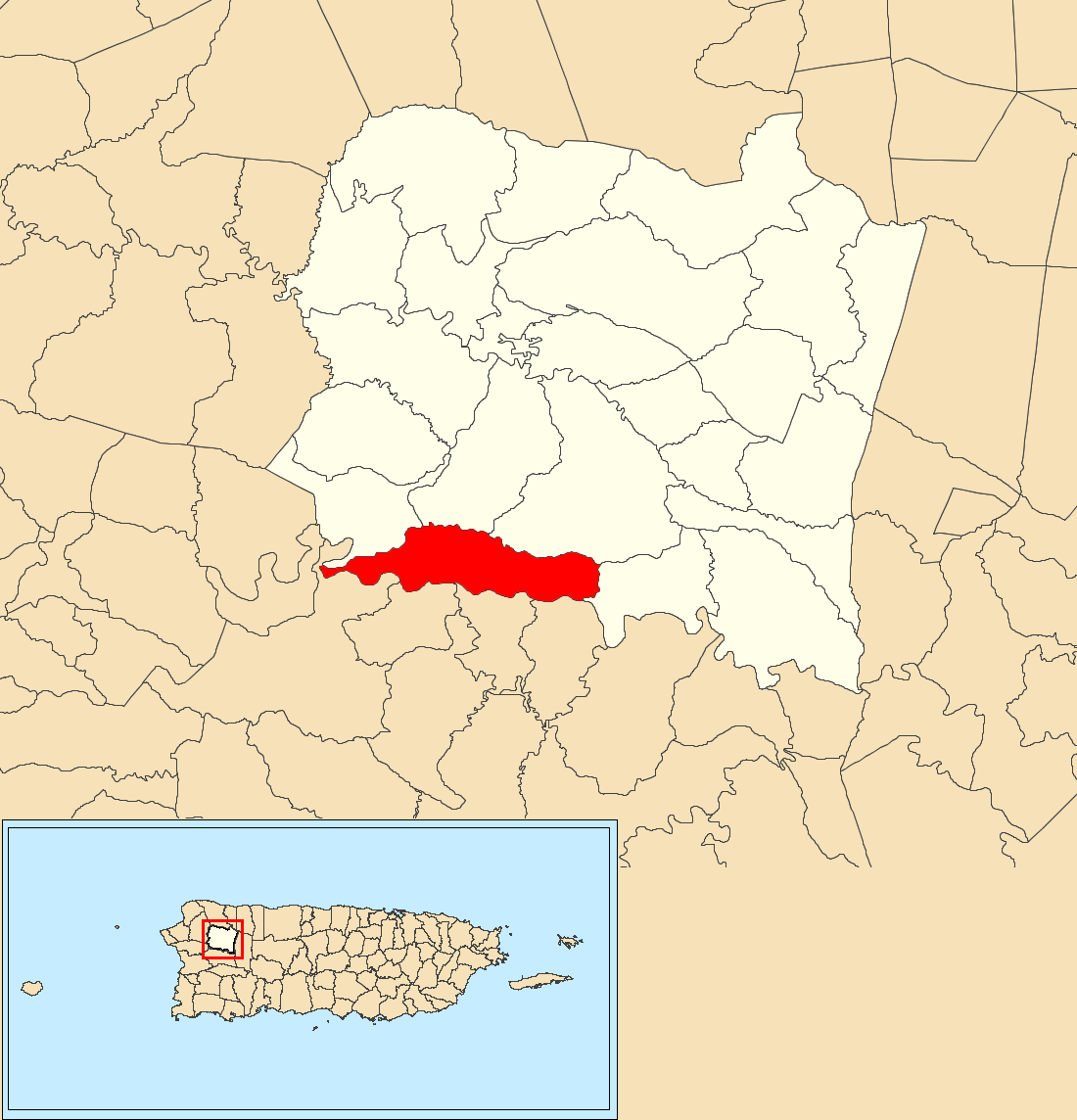
- Location of Guacio within the municipality of San Sebastián shown in red

- Location of Puerto Rico
- Coordinates: 18°17′09″N 67°00′29″W
- Commonwealth: Puerto Rico
- Municipality: San Sebastián

Area
  - Total: 3.04 sq mi (7.9 km^{2})
  - Land: 2.99 sq mi (7.7 km^{2})
  - Water: 0.05 sq mi (0.13 km^{2})
- Elevation: 705 ft (215 m)

Population (2010)
  - Total: 640
  - Density: 214/sq mi (83/km^{2})
- Source: 2010 Census
- Time zone: UTC−4 (AST)

Guacio is a barrio in the municipality of San Sebastián, Puerto Rico. Its population in 2010 was 640.

== History ==
Guacio was in Spain's gazetteers until Puerto Rico was ceded by Spain in the aftermath of the Spanish–American War under the terms of the Treaty of Paris of 1898 and became an unincorporated territory of the United States. In 1899, the United States Department of War conducted a census of Puerto Rico finding that the population of Guacio barrio was 562.

Historical population
Census	Pop.	Note	%±
1900	562		—
1910	616		9.6%
1920	628		1.9%
1930	586		−6.7%
1940	664		13.3%
1950	834		25.6%
1960	770		−7.7%
1970	534		−30.6%
1980	520		−2.6%
1990	605		16.3%
2000	733		21.2%
2010	640		−12.7%
U.S. Decennial Census; 1899 (shown as 1900) 1910-1930; 1930-1950 1980-2000 2010

== Sectors ==
Barrios (which are, in contemporary times, roughly comparable to minor civil divisions) in turn are further subdivided into smaller local populated place areas/units called sectores (sectors in English). The types of sectores may vary, from normally sector to urbanización to reparto to barriada to residencial, among others.

The following sectors are in Guacio barrio:

Carretera 119, Carretera 424, Carretera 433, Parcelas El Guacio, Parcelas Marco Antonio, Sector Boquerón, Sector Campamento Boys Scouts, Sector Domenech, Sector Inglés, Sector Lulo Rivera, and Sector Tosquero.

== See also ==
- List of communities in Puerto Rico
- List of barrios and sectors of San Sebastián, Puerto Rico
