= Perchas 1 =

Barrio of San Sebastián, Puerto Rico

- Barrio
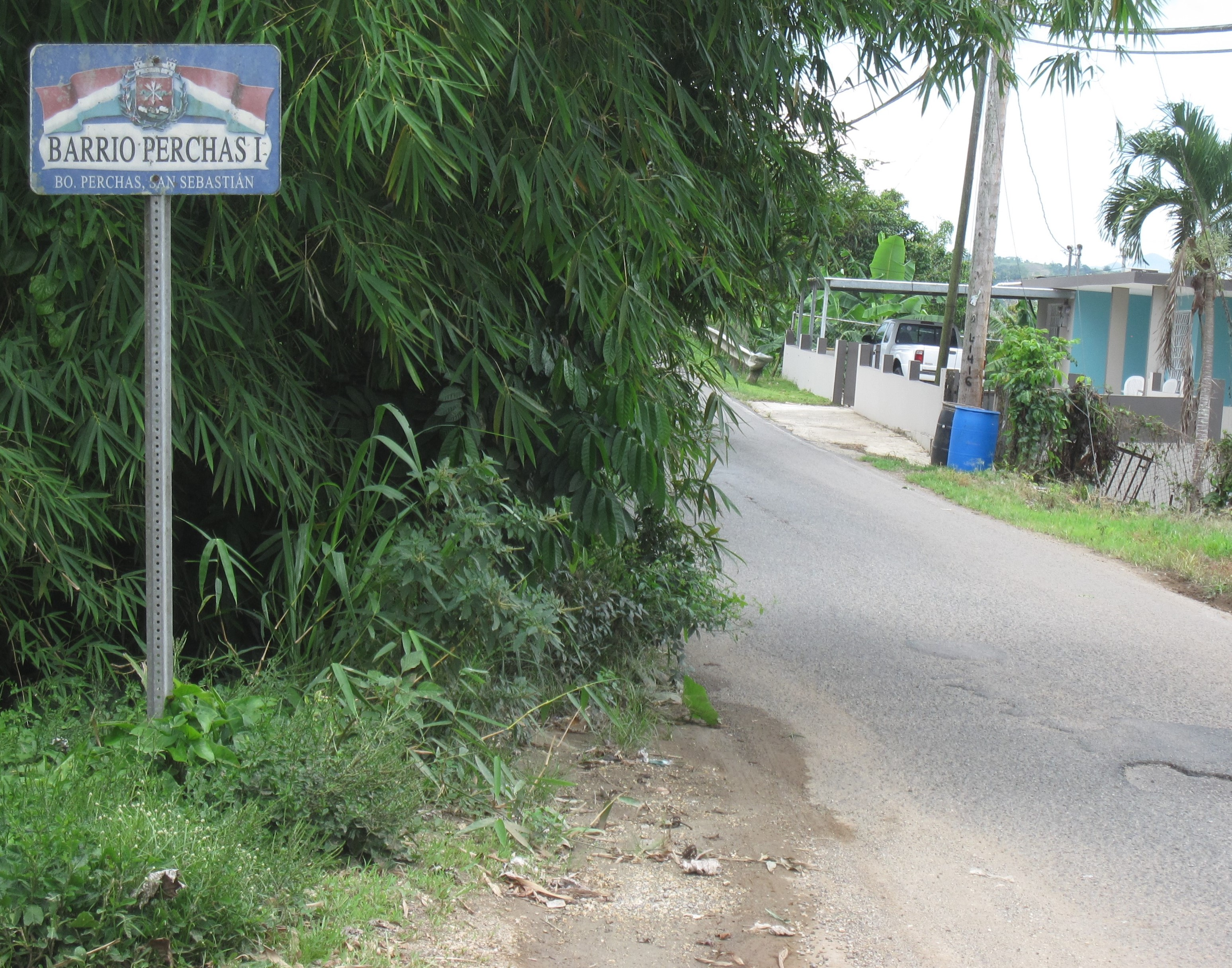
- Sign at start of Perchas 1 entrance

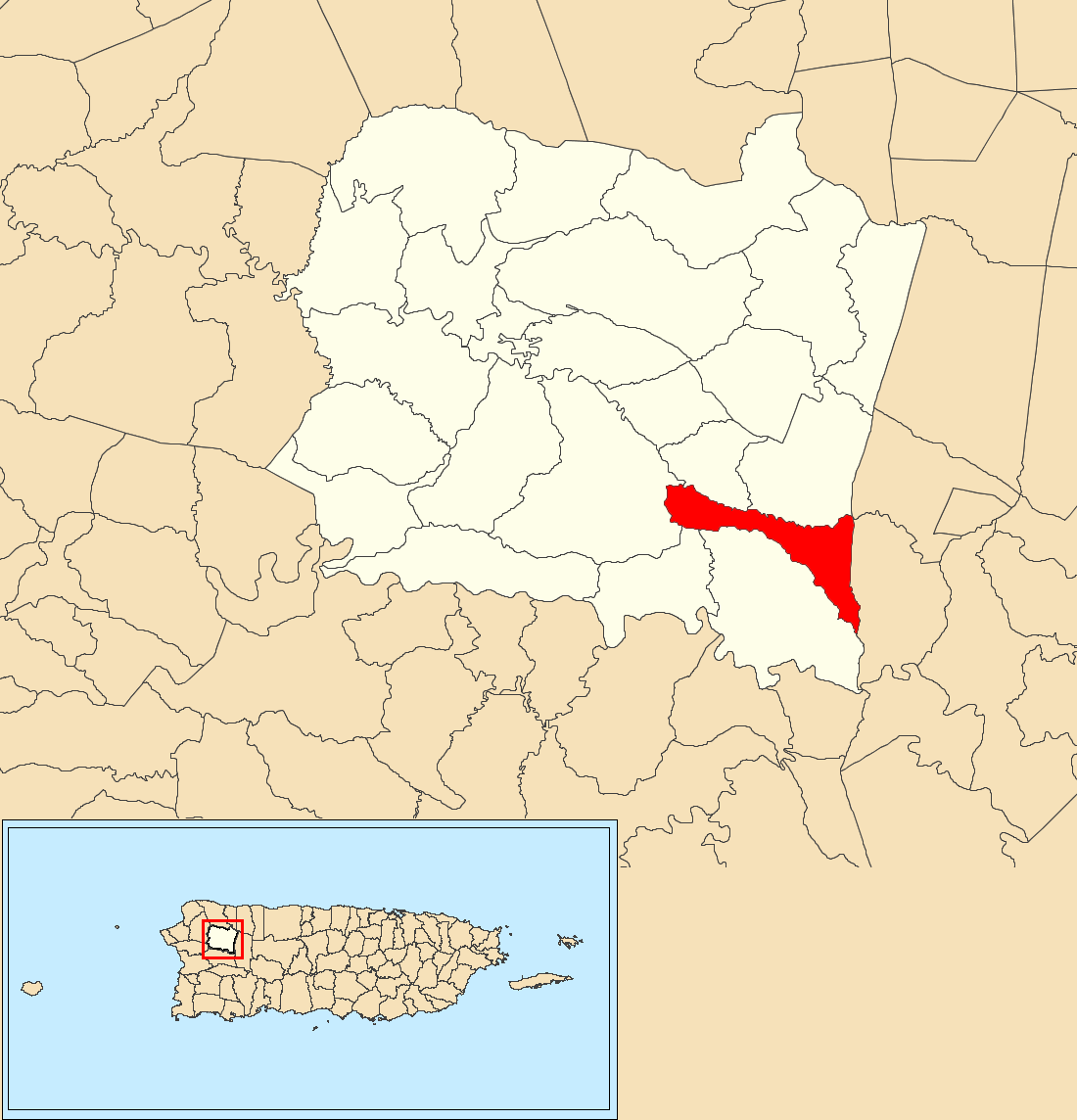
- Location of Perchas 1 within the municipality of San Sebastián shown in red

- Location of Puerto Rico
- Coordinates: 18°17′21″N 66°55′38″W
- Commonwealth: Puerto Rico
- Municipality: San Sebastián

Area
  - Total: 2.04 sq mi (5.3 km^{2})
  - Land: 2.04 sq mi (5.3 km^{2})
  - Water: 0 sq mi (0 km^{2})
- Elevation: 932 ft (284 m)

Population (2010)
  - Total: 902
  - Density: 442.2/sq mi (170.7/km^{2})
- Source: 2010 Census
- Time zone: UTC−4 (AST)

Perchas 1 is a barrio in the municipality of San Sebastián, Puerto Rico. Its population in 2010 was 902.

== History ==
Perchas 1 was in Spain's gazetteers until Puerto Rico was ceded by Spain in the aftermath of the Spanish–American War under the terms of the Treaty of Paris of 1898 and became an unincorporated territory of the United States. In 1899, the United States Department of War conducted a census of Puerto Rico finding that the combined population of Perchas 1 and Perchas 2 barrios was 1,429.

Historical population
Census	Pop.	Note	%±
1910	622		—
1920	811		30.4%
1930	535		−34.0%
1940	578		8.0%
1950	581		0.5%
1960	636		9.5%
1970	482		−24.2%
1980	827		71.6%
1990	757		−8.5%
2000	1,024		35.3%
2010	902		−11.9%
U.S. Decennial Census; 1900 (N/A) 1910-1930; 1930-1950 1980-2000 2010

== Sectors ==
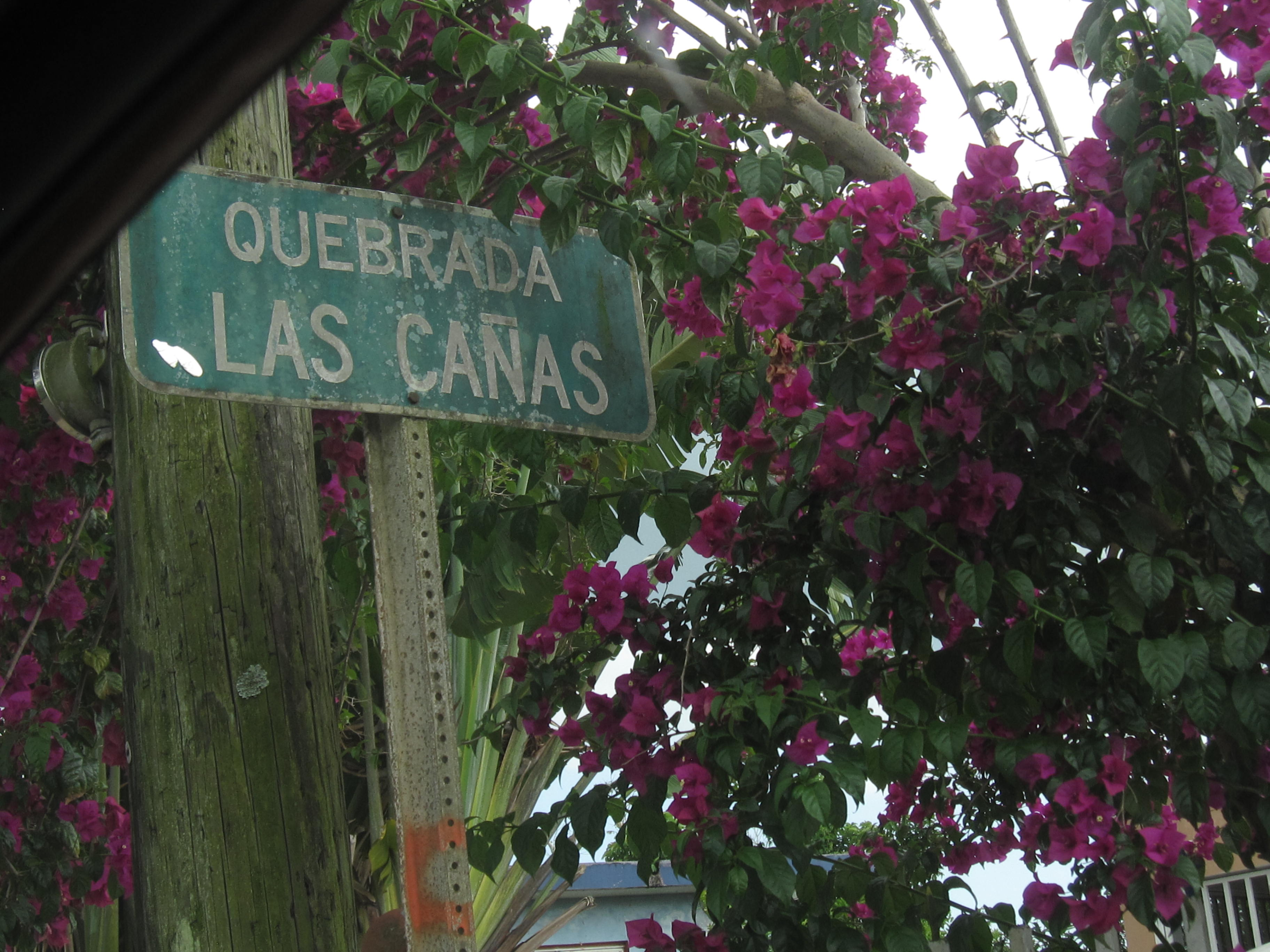
Sign for Sector Quebrada Las Cañas in Perchas 1

Barrios (which are, in contemporary times, roughly comparable to minor civil divisions) in turn are further subdivided into smaller local populated place areas/units called sectores (sectors in English). The types of sectores may vary, from normally sector to urbanización to reparto to barriada to residencial, among others.

The following sectors are in Perchas 1 barrio:

Carretera 435, Carretera 4435, and Sector Quebrada Las Cañas.

== See also ==
- List of communities in Puerto Rico
- List of barrios and sectors of San Sebastián, Puerto Rico
