= Mirabales =

Barrio of San Sebastián, Puerto Rico

- Barrio
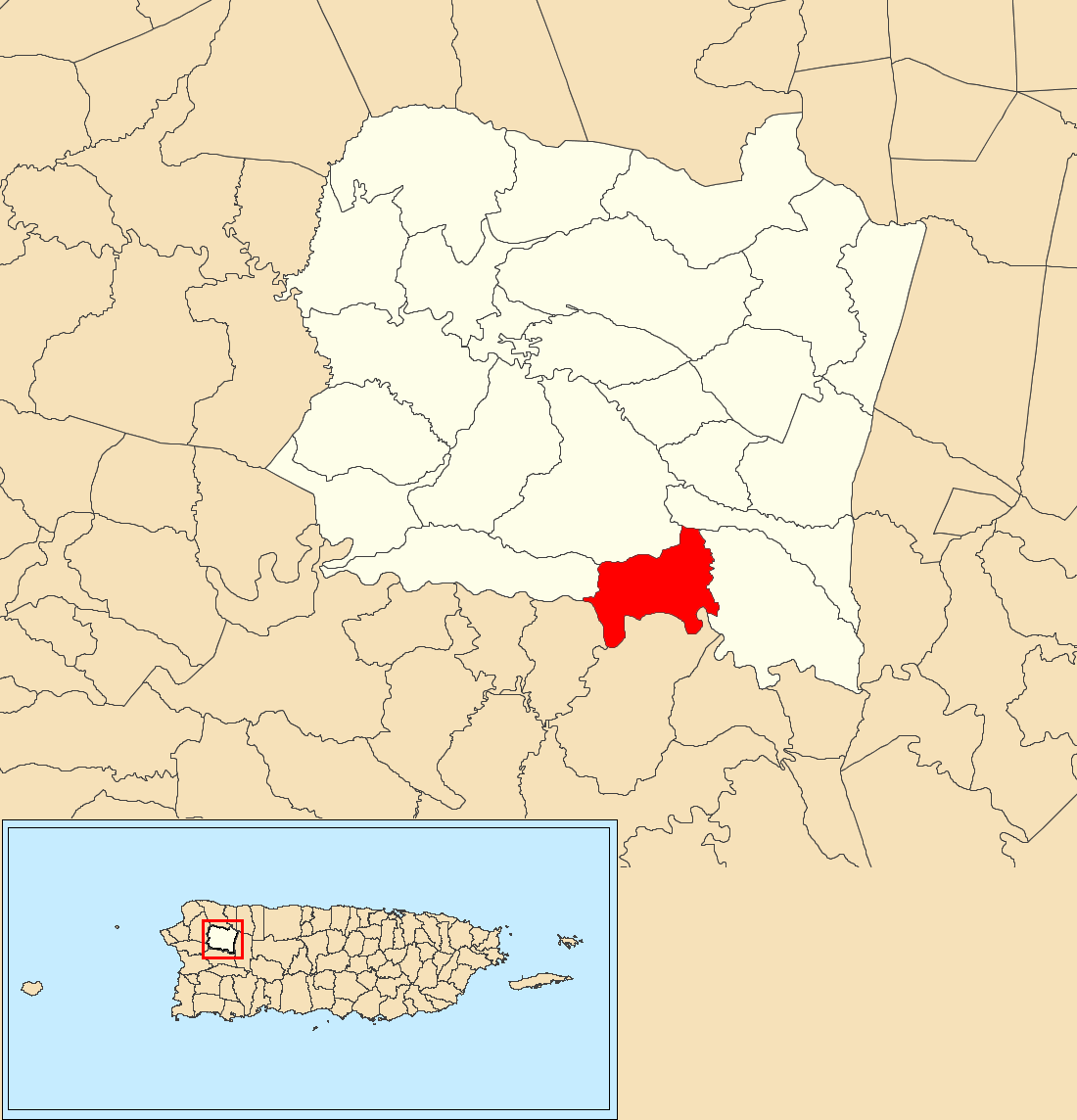
- Location of Mirabales within the municipality of San Sebastián shown in red

- Location of Puerto Rico
- Coordinates: 18°16′34″N 66°57′28″W
- Commonwealth: Puerto Rico
- Municipality: San Sebastián

Area
  - Total: 2.22 sq mi (5.7 km^{2})
  - Land: 2.20 sq mi (5.7 km^{2})
  - Water: 0.02 sq mi (0.052 km^{2})
- Elevation: 863 ft (263 m)

Population (2020)
  - Total: 566
  - Density: 305.5/sq mi (118.0/km^{2})
- Source: 2010 Census
- Time zone: UTC−4 (AST)

Mirabales is a barrio in the municipality of San Sebastián, Puerto Rico. Its population was 566 at the 2020 census.

== History ==
Mirabales was in Spain's gazetteers until Puerto Rico was ceded by Spain in the aftermath of the Spanish–American War under the terms of the Treaty of Paris of 1898 and became an unincorporated territory of the United States. In 1899, the United States Department of War conducted a census of Puerto Rico finding that the population of Mirabales barrio was 404.

Historical population
Census	Pop.	Note	%±
1900	404		—
1910	514		27.2%
1920	546		6.2%
1930	525		−3.8%
1940	714		36.0%
1950	827		15.8%
1960	759		−8.2%
1970	660		−13.0%
1980	564		−14.5%
1990	526		−6.7%
2000	624		18.6%
2010	672		7.7%
U.S. Decennial Census; 1899 (shown as 1900) 1910-1930; 1930-1950 1980-2000 2010

== Sectors ==
Barrios (which are, in contemporary times, roughly comparable to minor civil divisions) in turn are further subdivided into smaller local populated place areas/units called sectores (sectors in English). The types of sectores may vary, from normally sector to urbanización to reparto to barriada to residencial, among others.

The following sectors are in Mirabales barrio:

Carretera 433, Sector Israel Hernández, Sector Los Pérez, Sector Núñez, and Sector Quebrada Las Cañas.

== See also ==
- List of communities in Puerto Rico
- List of barrios and sectors of San Sebastián, Puerto Rico
