= Puerto Rico Highway 111 =

Highway in Puerto Rico

Highway 111
- Ruta 111
- Carretera Enrique Laguerre

Route information
- Maintained by Puerto Rico DTPW
- Length: 67.4 km (41.9 mi)
- Existed: 1953–present

Major junctions
- West end: PR-2 / PR-1107 in Victoria
- PR-125 in Pueblo; PR-110 in Moca barrio-pueblo; PR-125 in Hato Arriba–Guatemala; PR-119 in Bahomamey–Piedras Blancas; PR-125 in Piedras Blancas; PR-124 in Pueblo; PR-129 in Lares; PR-134 in Lares; PR-10 in Salto Abajo; PR-123 in Utuado barrio-pueblo
- East end: PR-140 in Las Palmas

Location
- Country: United States
- Territory: Puerto Rico
- Municipalities: Aguadilla, Moca, San Sebastián, Lares, Utuado

Highway system
- Roads in Puerto Rico; List
← PR-110	→ PR-112
← PR-1107	PR-1111	→ PR-1116
← PR-4110	PR-4111	→ PR-4116
← PR-5568	PR-6111	→ PR-6165

Puerto Rico Highway 111 (PR-111) is a highway connecting Aguadilla, Puerto Rico at Puerto Rico Highway 2 and Puerto Rico Highway 115 to Utuado, Puerto Rico at Puerto Rico Highway 140.

== Route description ==
It is the main highway to Moca and San Sebastián, being a two-lane highway before turning rural on its way to Lares, where it meets PR-129, which taking north goes to Arecibo and meets PR-2 and PR-22. In Lares, it becomes a divided avenue, replacing an old, narrow segment, but then becomes rural again. It continues to Utuado, crossing PR-10, and merging shortly with PR-123. It ends at PR-140 east of Utuado, near Jayuya. It is one of two long highways going west–east through the center of Puerto Rico (the other being PR-156). It is named the Carretera Enrique Laguerre through all its length.

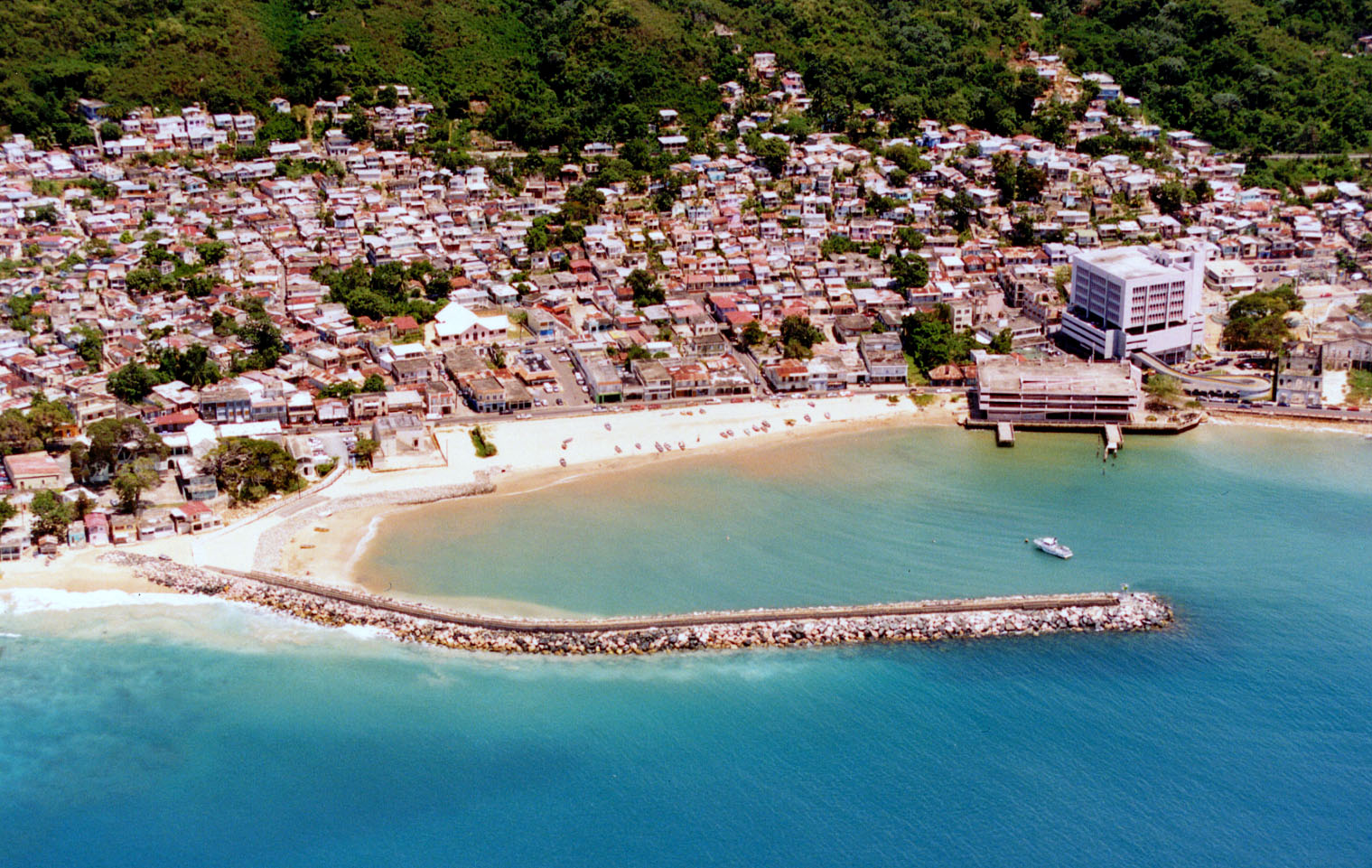
PR-111 on the Aguadilla pueblo coast

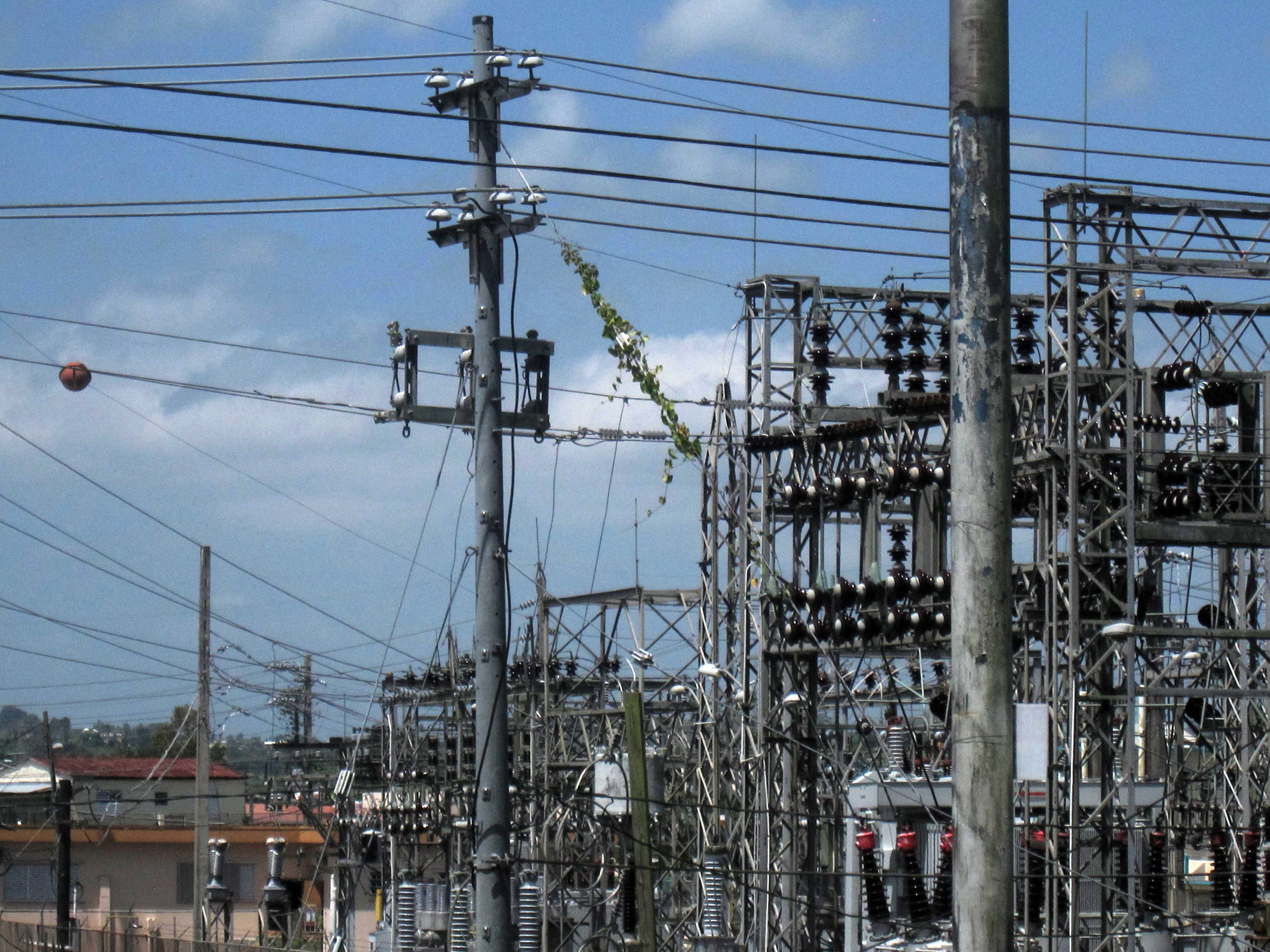
Electric plant on PR-111 in Bahomamey, San Sebastián

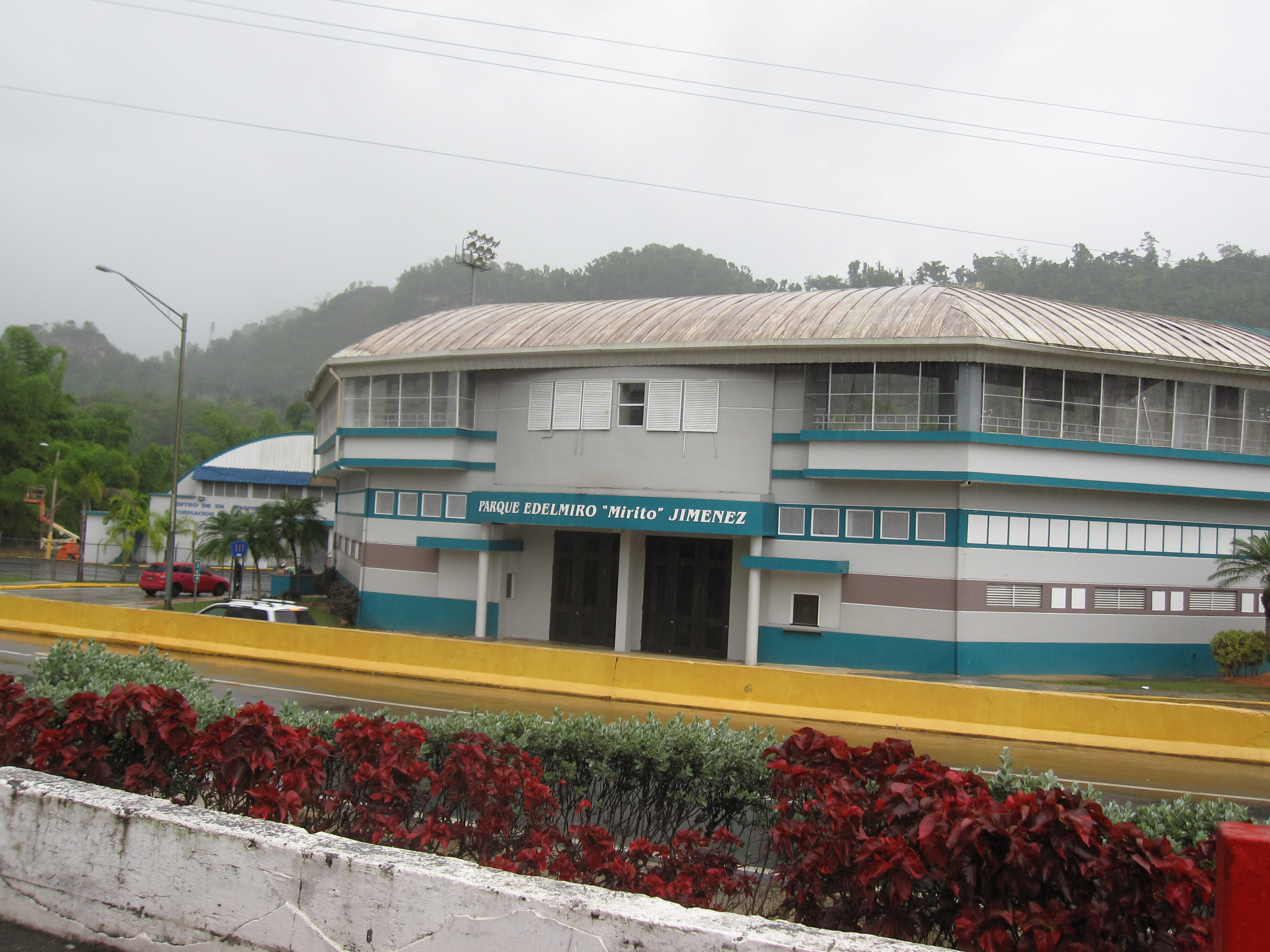
Ball park on PR-111 in Lares barrio

== Major intersections ==
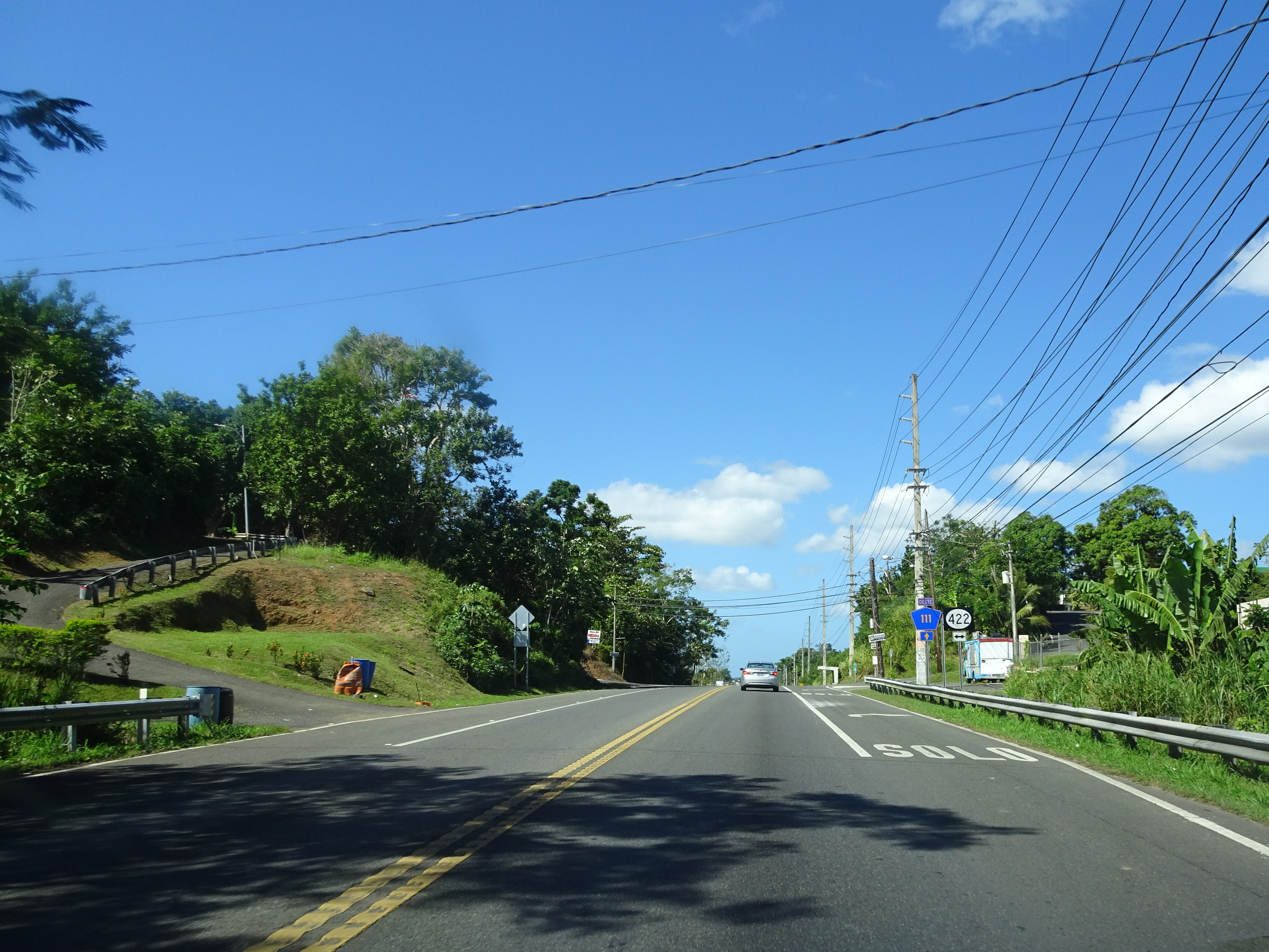
PR-111 at its junction with PR-422 in Moca

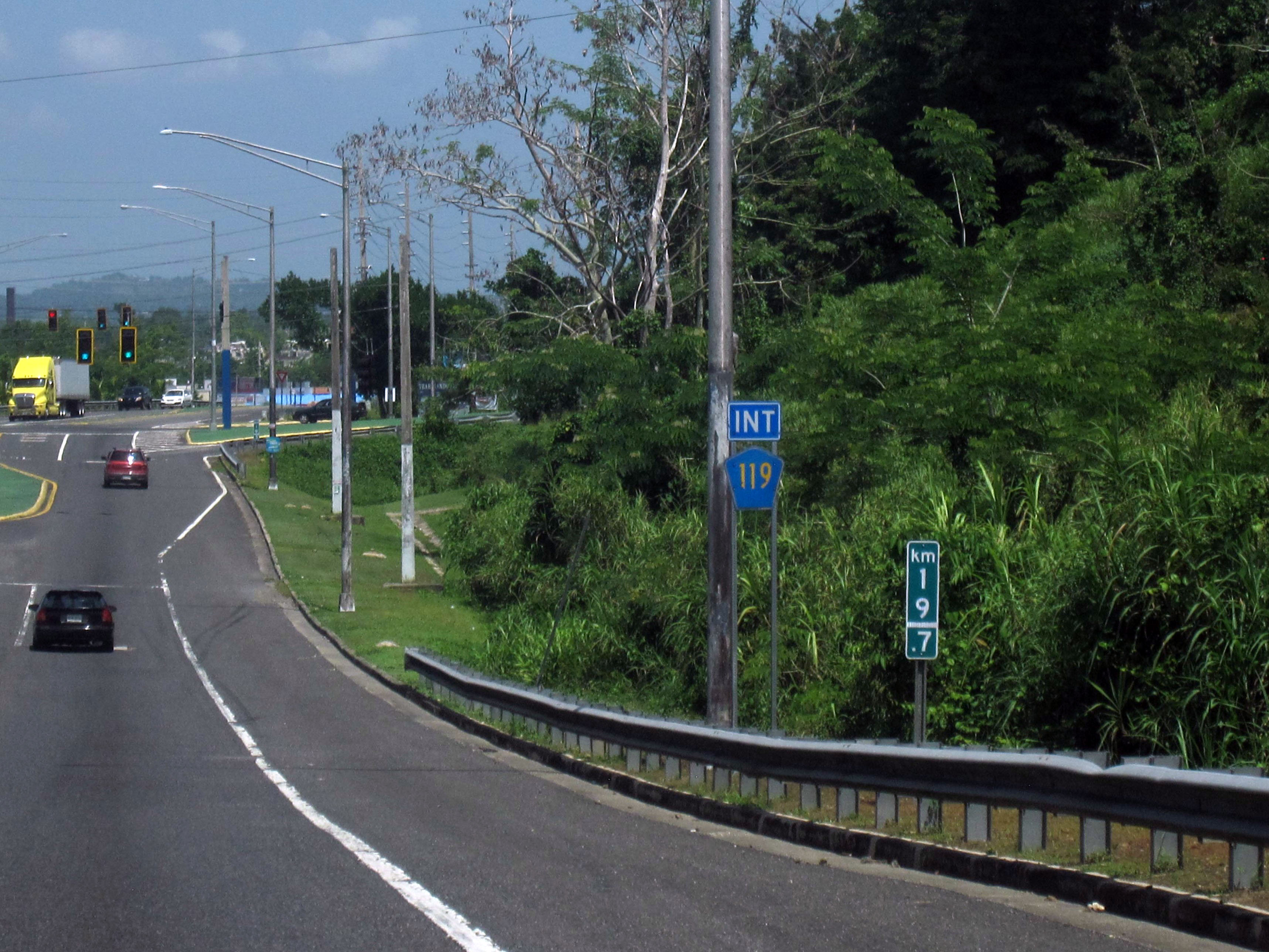
PR-111 near its junction with PR-119 in San Sebastián

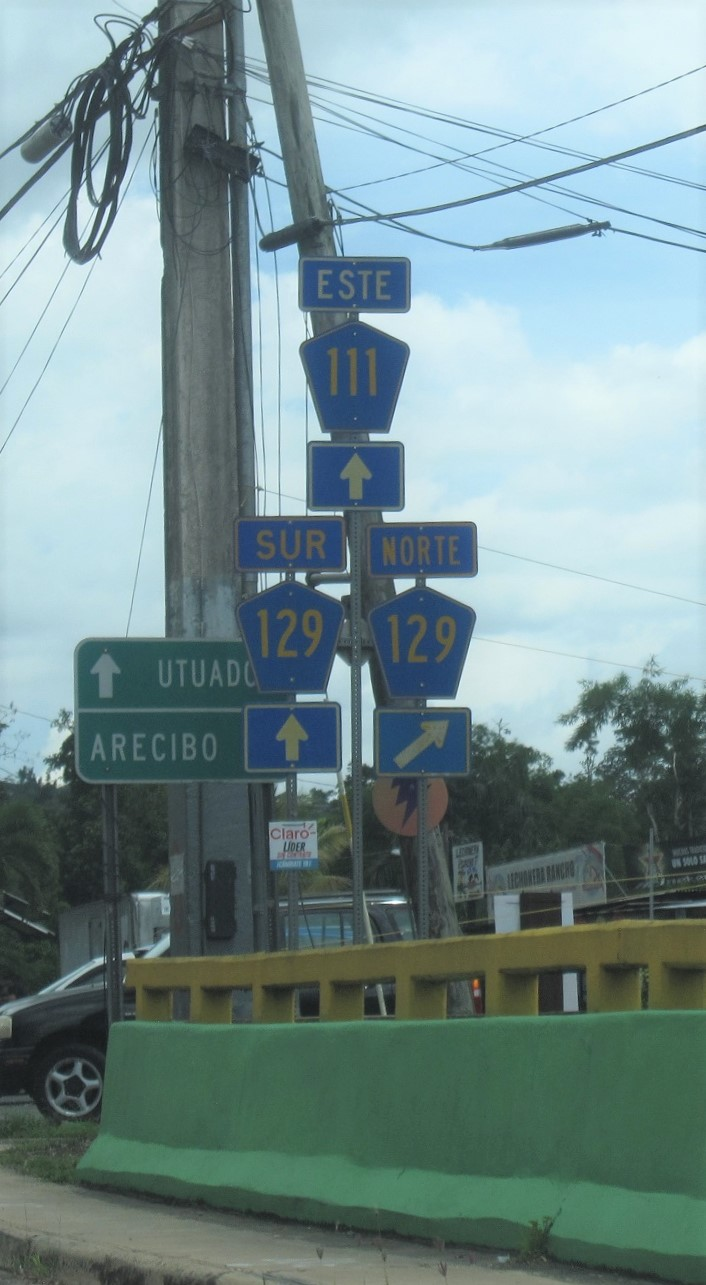
PR-111 at its junction with PR-129 in Lares

Municipality	Location	km	mi	Destinations	Notes
Aguadilla	Victoria	0.0	0.0	PR-1107 north (Avenida Victoria)	Continuation beyond PR-2
Aguadilla	Victoria	0.0	0.0	PR-2 (Expreso Rafael Hernández, "El Jibarito") – Arecibo, Añasco, Mayagüez	Western terminus of PR-111 and southern terminus of PR-1107; partial cloverleaf interchange
Aguadilla	Victoria	0.3	0.19	PR-4443 – Palmar	
Aguadilla	Palmar	1.2	0.75	PR-4443 – Palmar	Seagull intersection
Aguadilla	Palmar	1.7	1.1	PR-443 – Caimital Bajo	
Aguadilla	Palmar	2.1	1.3	PR-125 – Moca	
Moca	Pueblo	3.3	2.1	PR-125 – Moca, Aguadilla	
Moca	Moca barrio-pueblo	4.8	3.0	PR-110 (Calle Concepción Vera Ayala) – Moca, Arecibo	
Moca	Moca barrio-pueblo–Pueblo line	5.4– 5.5	3.4– 3.4	PR-444 (Carretera Quique Vale Avilés) – Cuchillas	
Moca	Voladoras	7.6	4.7	PR-125 – Cruz, Voladoras	
Moca	Voladoras	9.4	5.8	PR-420 (Carretera Víctor Raúl Hernández Nieves) – Voladoras	
Moca	Capá	11.9	7.4	PR-421 – Capá	
Moca	Capá	12.7	7.9	PR-422 – Capá	
San Sebastián	Hato Arriba	14.1	8.8	PR-423 – Hato Arriba	
San Sebastián	Hato Arriba–Guatemala line	15.7	9.8	PR-125 – Hato Arriba, Central Plata	
San Sebastián	Guatemala	17.4– 17.5	10.8– 10.9	PR-445 – Salto	
San Sebastián	Guatemala	18.2– 18.3	11.3– 11.4	PR-446 (Avenida Ricardo Serrano) – Bosque Guajataca	
San Sebastián	Bahomamey–Piedras Blancas line	19.4– 19.5	12.1– 12.1	PR-119 – San Sebastián, Camuy	
San Sebastián	Piedras Blancas	20.9	13.0	PR-125 west (Avenida Emérito Estrada Rivera) – San Sebastián	Former PR-111R
San Sebastián	Piedras Blancas	21.3– 21.4	13.2– 13.3	PR-450 – Cidral	
San Sebastián	Piedras Blancas	21.5– 21.6	13.4– 13.4	PR-4111 (Carretera Don Esteban "Bin" González Arocho) – Piedras Blancas	
San Sebastián	Piedras Blancas	22.3	13.9	PR-4111 (Carretera Don Esteban "Bin" González Arocho) – Piedras Blancas	
San Sebastián	Eneas–Cidral line	24.0	14.9	PR-450 – Cidral	
San Sebastián	Eneas–Cidral line	25.1– 25.2	15.6– 15.7	PR-448 – Guajataca	
San Sebastián	Eneas–Cidral line	25.3– 25.4	15.7– 15.8	PR-4451 – Eneas	
San Sebastián	Eneas–Cidral– Magos tripoint	26.0– 26.1	16.2– 16.2	PR-438 – Magos	
Lares	Pueblo	30.3	18.8	PR-470 – Juncal	
Lares	Pueblo	31.9	19.8	PR-1111 – Lares	
Lares	Pueblo	32.4	20.1	PR-436 – Maricao	
Lares	Pueblo	32.7	20.3	PR-124 – Las Marías	
Lares	Lares barrio-pueblo	33.2	20.6	PR-4128 – Lares	
Lares	Lares barrio-pueblo	33.5	20.8	PR-1111 (Calle Doctor Pedro Albizu Campos) – Lares	
Lares	Lares barrio-pueblo	34.6– 34.7	21.5– 21.6	PR-452 – Pueblo	
Lares	Lares barrio-pueblo	35.0	21.7	PR-1111 to PR-128 – Lares, Yauco	
Lares	Lares	35.2	21.9	PR-129 north (Carretera Mariana Bracetti) – Arecibo	Western terminus of PR-129 concurrency; diamond interchange
Lares	Lares	38.2	23.7	PR-129 south – Adjuntas	Eastern terminus of PR-129 concurrency
Lares	Lares	38.8	24.1	PR-4454 – Callejones	
Lares	Lares	40.2	25.0	PR-134 – Hatillo	
Utuado	Angeles	42.2	26.2	PR-600 – Santa Isabel	
Utuado	Angeles	45.2	28.1	PR-602 – Ángeles	
Utuado	Caguana	52.4	32.6	PR-603 – Roncador	
Utuado	Caguana	52.6	32.7	PR-6121 – Caguana	Former PR-621
Utuado	Salto Arriba–Salto Abajo– Caguana tripoint	55.6	34.5	PR-622 – Caguana	
Utuado	Salto Abajo	59.7	37.1	PR-10 (Carretera Félix Ramón "Moncho" Estévez Datis) – Arecibo, Adjuntas	
Utuado	Utuado barrio-pueblo	60.3	37.5	PR-123 – Arecibo	Western terminus of PR-123 concurrency
Utuado	Utuado barrio-pueblo	60.6	37.7	PR-123 to PR-6111 (Avenida Guillermo Esteves) – Utuado, Adjuntas	Eastern terminus of PR-123 concurrency
Utuado	Utuado barrio-pueblo–Viví Abajo– Salto Abajo tripoint	62.0	38.5	PR-611 – Sabana Grande	
Utuado	Utuado barrio-pueblo–Viví Abajo line	63.8	39.6	PR-6111 (Avenida Guillermo Esteves) – Utuado	
Utuado	Viví Abajo	65.1	40.5	PR-605 – Viví Arriba	
Utuado	Las Palmas	67.4	41.9	PR-140 – Jayuya, Florida	Eastern terminus of PR-111
1.000 mi = 1.609 km; 1.000 km = 0.621 mi: Concurrency terminus

== Related routes ==
Currently, PR-111 has three branches in its old segments in San Sebastián, Lares and Utuado, and previously had another in Aguadilla. Originally they were identified as PR-111R. There are projects for Highway 111 listed on the Transportation Improvement Program for fiscal years 2017–2020, involving reconstructing, relocating and widening parts of the highway.

=== Aguadilla loop ===
Highway 111 Spur
- Location: Aguadilla
- Length: 1.6 km (0.99 mi)
- Existed: y

Highway 111 Loop (Spanish: Carretera Ramal 111, abbreviated Ramal PR-111 or PR-111R) was a road that branched off from PR-111 to returning to its parent route in downtown Aguadilla. Currently the highway was renumbered to PR-1107P after PR-111 was replaced by PR-1107 through downtown area. The entire route is located in Aguadilla barrio-pueblo, Aguadilla.

km	mi	Destinations	Notes
1.6	0.99	PR-111 south	Southern terminus of PR-111R; access to Moca; unsigned
0.7	0.43	PR-2 Spur east to PR-2	One-way street; westbound access is via Calle Mercedes Moreno; access to Arecibo and Mayagüez; unsigned
0.3	0.19	PR-440	One-way street; northern terminus of PR-440; southbound access is via Calle Ramón Echevarría
0.0	0.0	PR-111	Northern terminus of PR-111R
1.000 mi = 1.609 km; 1.000 km = 0.621 mi: Incomplete access

=== San Sebastián spur ===
Highway 111 Spur
- Location: San Sebastián
- Length: 1.2 km (0.75 mi)
- Existed: y

Highway 111 Spur (Spanish: Carretera Ramal 111, abbreviated Ramal PR-111 or PR-111R) was a road that branched off from PR-111 to its junction with PR-119 and PR-125 in downtown San Sebastián. Currently the highway was renumbered to PR-125. The entire route is located in Piedras Blancas, San Sebastián.

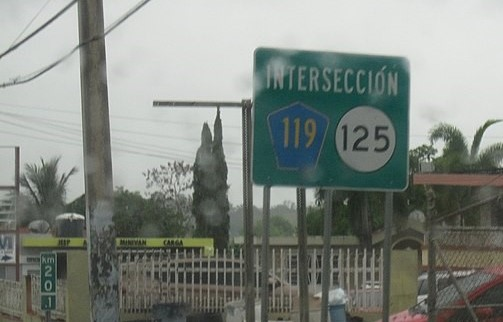
PR-111R near its junction with PR-119 and PR-125

km	mi	Destinations	Notes
0.0	0.0	PR-125 (Avenida Emérito Estrada Rivera) – Moca	Continuation beyond PR-119
0.0	0.0	PR-119 – San Sebastián, Las Marías	Western terminus of PR-111R and eastern terminus of PR-125
1.2	0.75	PR-111 (Carretera Enrique Laguerre) – Moca, Lares	Eastern terminus of PR-111R
1.000 mi = 1.609 km; 1.000 km = 0.621 mi

=== Puerto Rico Highway 1111 ===
Highway 1111
- Location: Lares
- Length: 4.5 km (2.8 mi)

Puerto Rico Highway 1111 (PR-1111) is the old section of PR-111 through downtown Lares. This road can be seen as Puerto Rico 111 Business loop. The entire route is located in Lares.

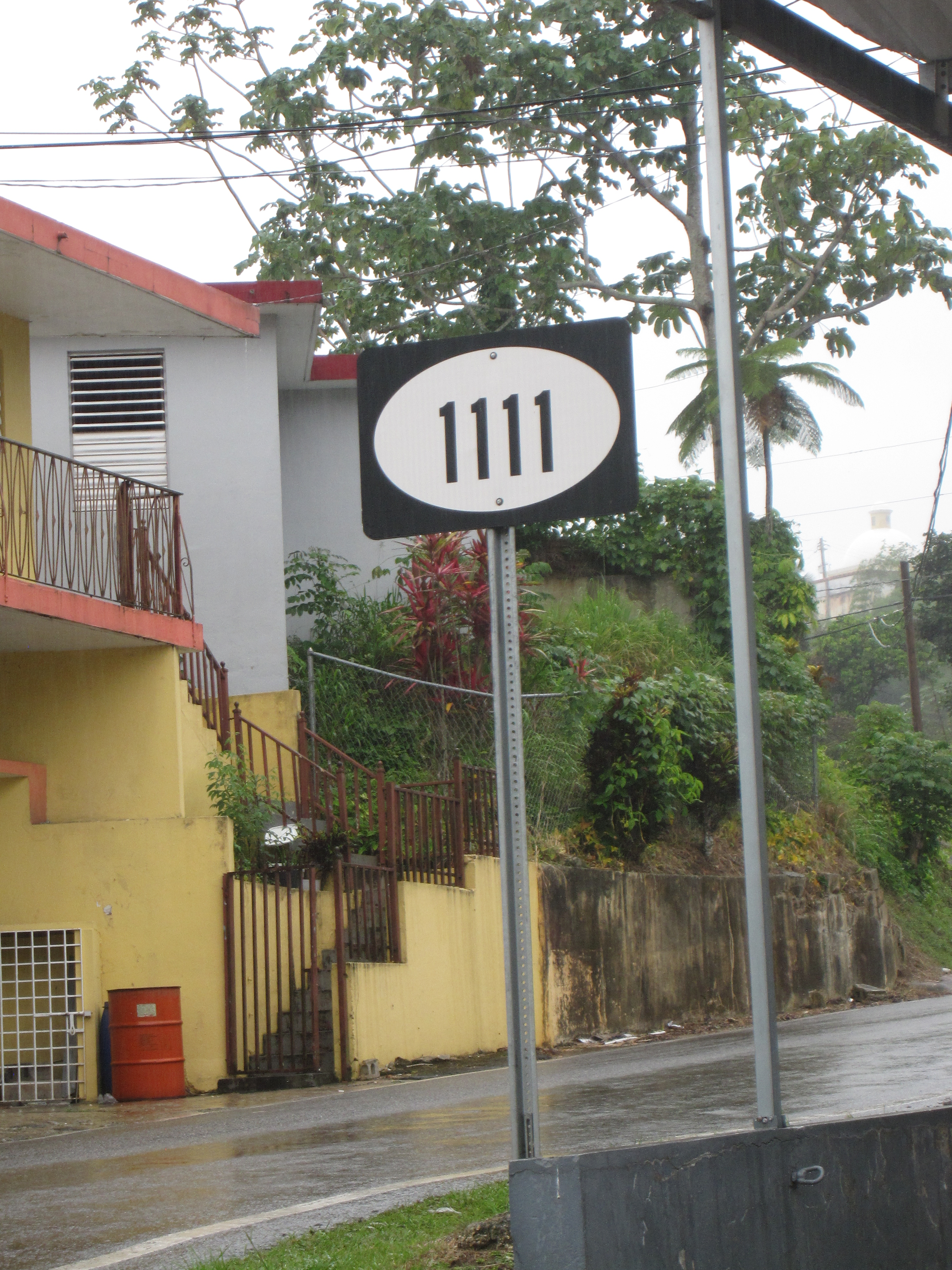
Puerto Rico Highway 1111 sign in Lares

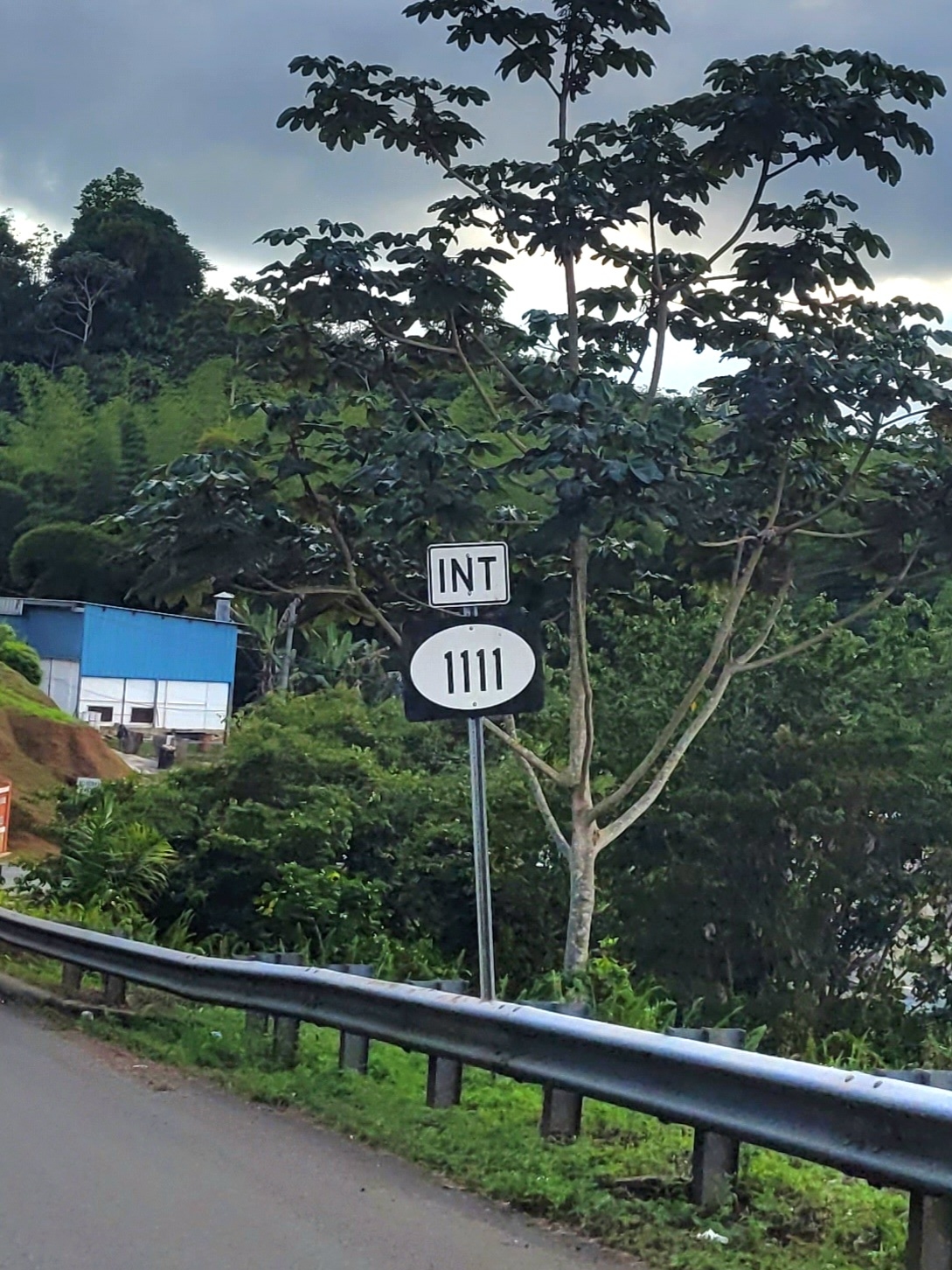
PR-128 north near PR-1111 junction in Lares

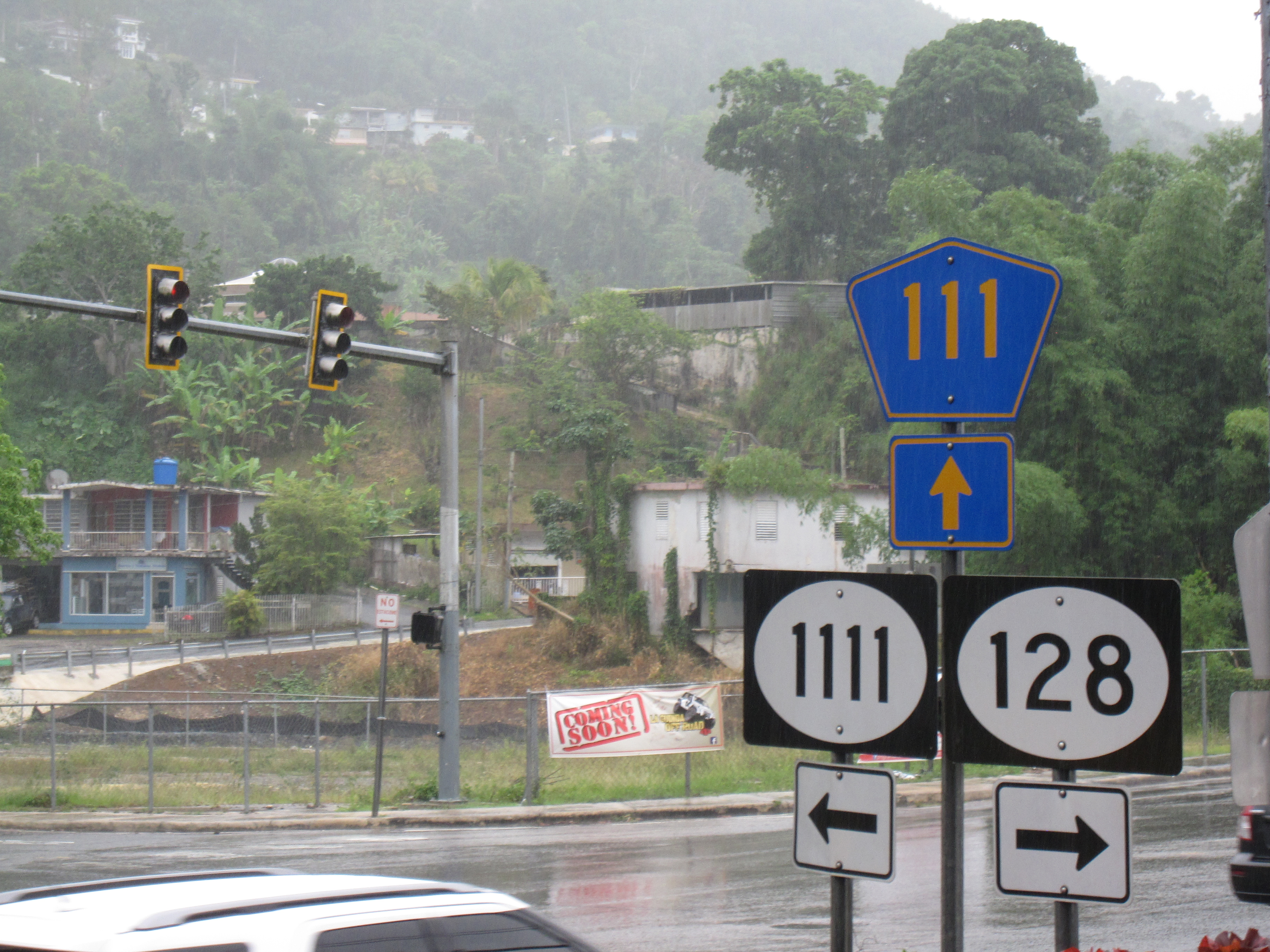
Puerto Rico Highways 1111, 128, 111 signs, in Lares

Location	km	mi	Destinations	Notes
Pueblo	0.0	0.0	PR-111 – San Sebastián	Western terminus of PR-1111
Pueblo–Lares barrio-pueblo line	0.7	0.43	PR-124 – Las Marías	
Lares barrio-pueblo	1.6	0.99	PR-111 (Avenida Los Patriotas) – Lares	
Lares barrio-pueblo	3.0	1.9	PR-128 / PR-4128 – Lares, Yauco	
Lares barrio-pueblo	3.7	2.3	PR-111 (Avenida Los Patriotas) – Lares	
Lares barrio-pueblo–Lares line	4.0– 4.1	2.5– 2.5	PR-129 (Carretera Mariana Bracetti) – Arecibo	
Lares	4.1	2.5	PR-453 – Lares	
Lares	4.5	2.8	Eastern terminus of PR-1111; dead end road	
1.000 mi = 1.609 km; 1.000 km = 0.621 mi

=== Puerto Rico Highway 4111 ===
Highway 4111
- Location: San Sebastián
- Length: 0.90 km (0.56 mi; 3,000 ft)

Puerto Rico Highway 4111 (PR-4111) is an old segment of PR-111 that provides access to a small residential area in Piedras Blancas, San Sebastián, Puerto Rico. The entire route is located in Piedras Blancas, San Sebastián.

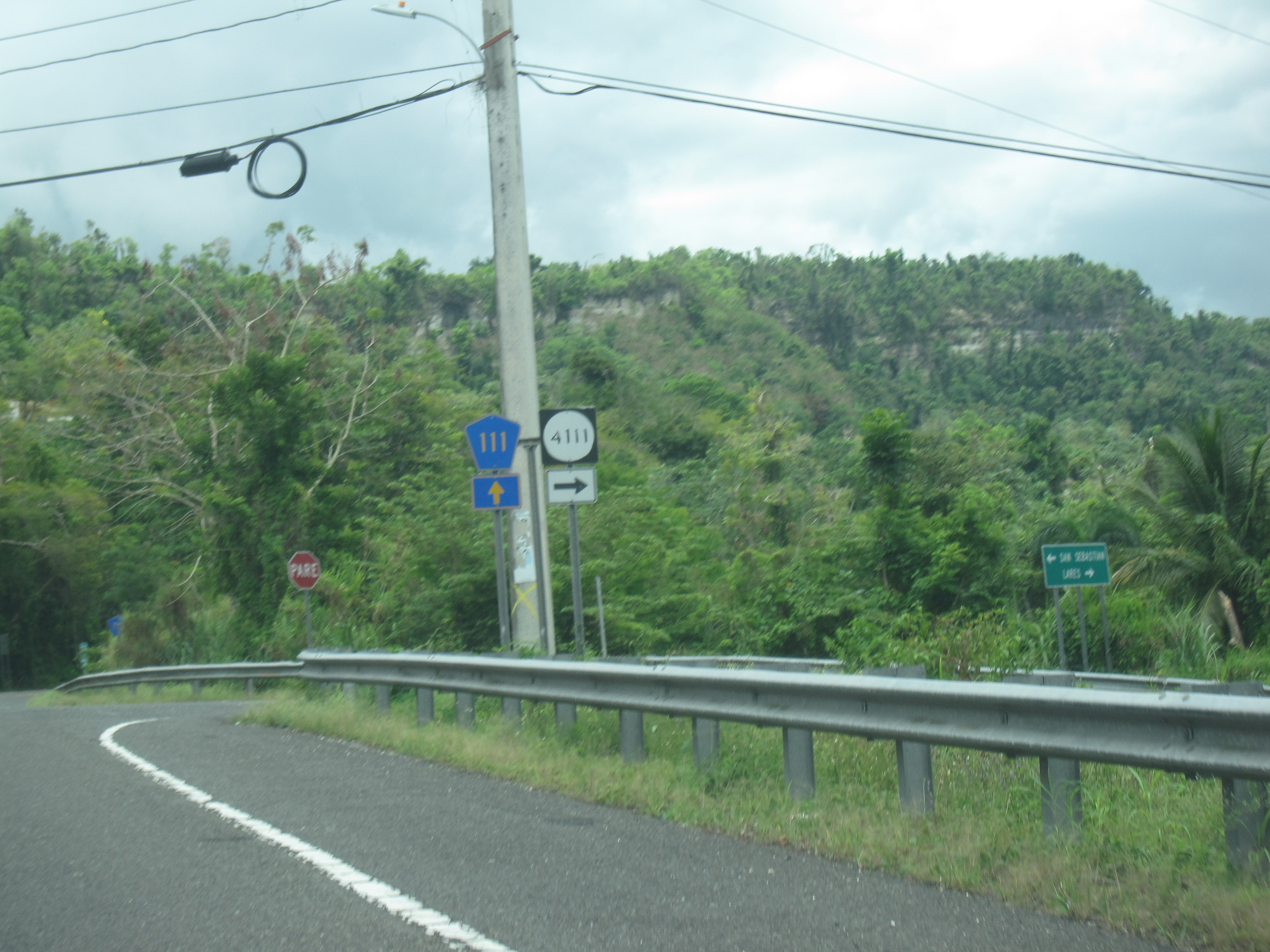
Puerto Rico Highway 4111 sign

km	mi	Destinations	Notes
0.00	0.00	PR-111 – San Sebastián, Moca, Aguadilla	Western terminus of PR-4111
0.90	0.56	PR-111 – Lares, Utuado	Eastern terminus of PR-4111
1.000 mi = 1.609 km; 1.000 km = 0.621 mi

=== Puerto Rico Highway 6111 ===
Highway 6111
- Location: Utuado
- Length: 2.8 km (1.7 mi)

Puerto Rico Highway 6111 (PR-6111) is the original route of PR-111 through downtown Utuado. Like PR-1111, this road can be seen as Puerto Rico 111 Business loop. The entire route is located in Utuado.

Location	km	mi	Destinations	Notes
Utuado barrio-pueblo	0.0	0.0	PR-123 to PR-10 (Carretera Ramón "Moncho" Estévez Datis) / PR-111 – Adjuntas, Lares, Arecibo	Western terminus of PR-6111
Utuado barrio-pueblo	0.8	0.50	PR-611 – Utuado	
Viví Abajo–Utuado barrio-pueblo line	2.8	1.7	PR-111 – Jayuya	Eastern terminus of PR-6111
1.000 mi = 1.609 km; 1.000 km = 0.621 mi

== See also ==
- 1953 Puerto Rico highway renumbering
