= Salto Abajo =

Barrio of Utuado, Puerto Rico

- Barrio
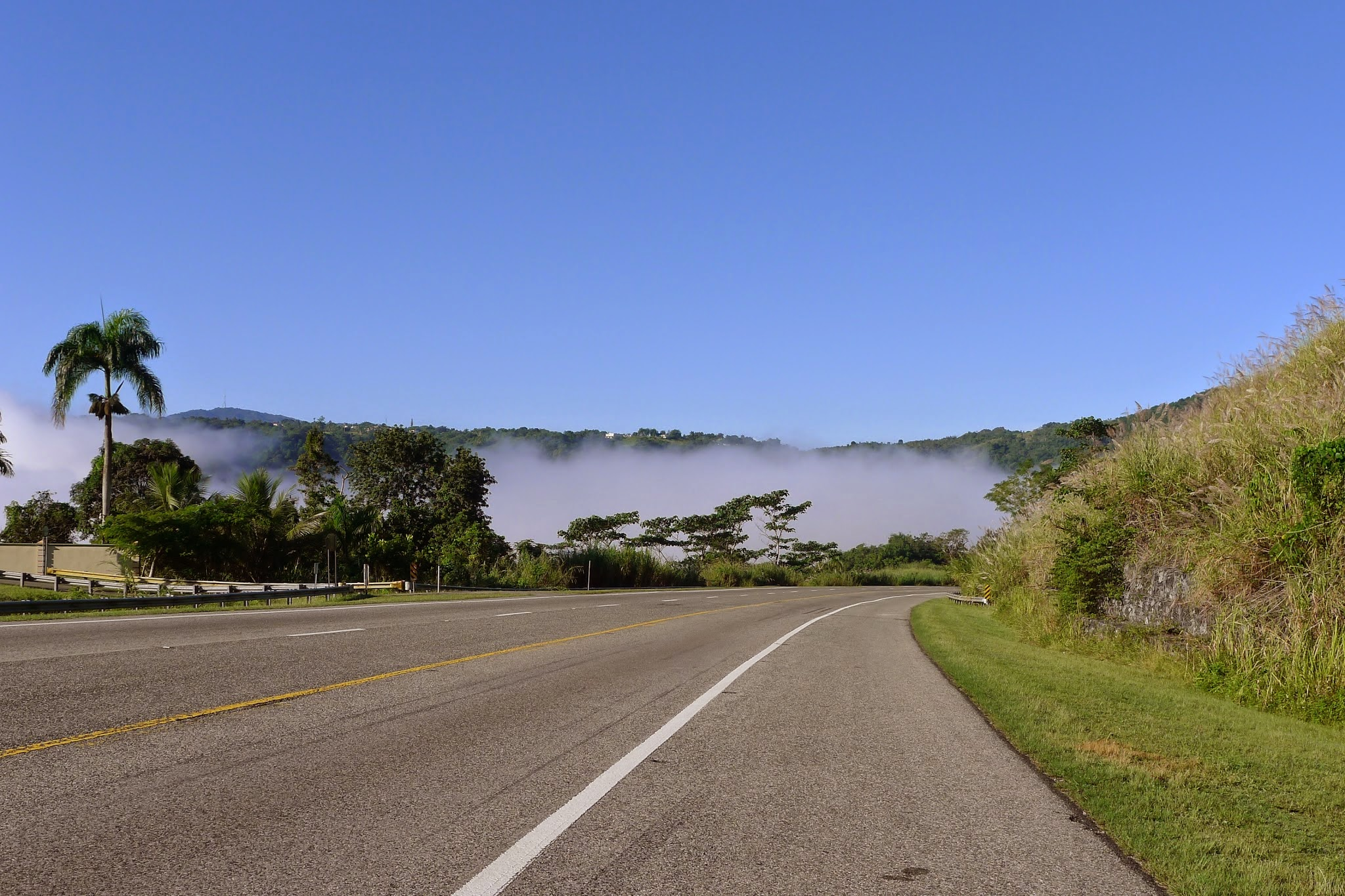
- Puerto Rico Highway 10 in Salto Abajo

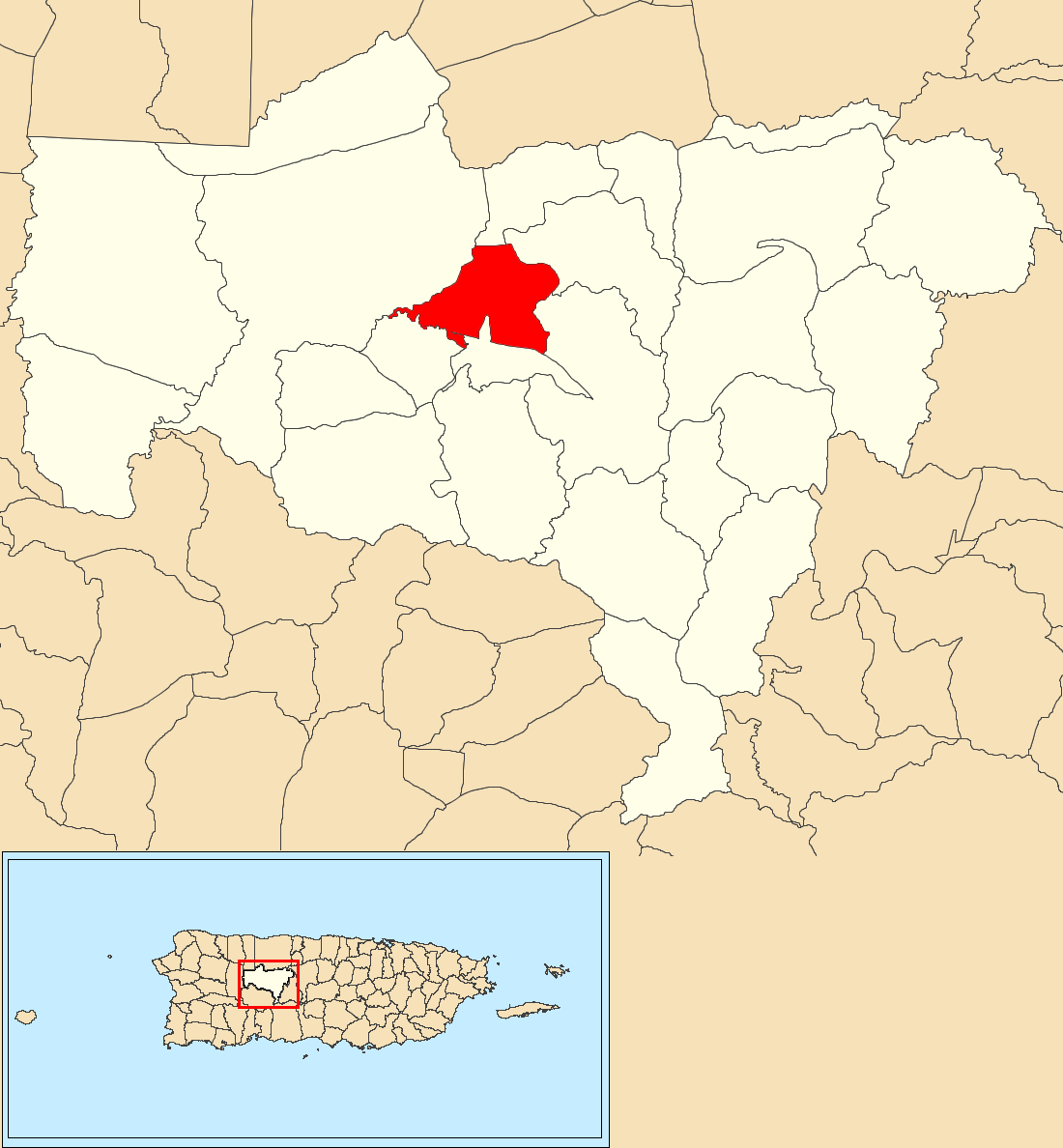
- Location of Salto Abajo within the municipality of Utuado shown in red

- Location of Puerto Rico
- Coordinates: 18°17′12″N 66°42′37″W
- Commonwealth: Puerto Rico
- Municipality: Utuado

Area
  - Total: 2.66 sq mi (6.9 km^{2})
  - Land: 2.63 sq mi (6.8 km^{2})
  - Water: 0.03 sq mi (0.078 km^{2})
- Elevation: 568 ft (173 m)

Population (2010)
  - Total: 3,929
  - Density: 1,493.9/sq mi (576.8/km^{2})
- Source: 2010 Census
- Time zone: UTC−4 (AST)

Salto Abajo is a barrio in the municipality of Utuado, Puerto Rico. Its population in 2010 was 3,929.

== Geography ==
Salto Abajo is situated at an elevation of 568 feet (173 m), just north of Salto Arriba and Pueblo in Utuado, Puerto Rico. It has an area of 2.66 square miles (6.9 km^{2}) of which 0.03 square miles (0.078 km^{2}) is water.

== History ==
Salto Abajo was in Spain's gazetteers until Puerto Rico was ceded by Spain in the aftermath of the Spanish–American War under the terms of the Treaty of Paris of 1898 and became an unincorporated territory of the United States. In 1899, the United States Department of War conducted a census of Puerto Rico finding that the population of Salto Abajo barrio was 836.

Historical population
Census	Pop.	Note	%±
1900	836		—
1910	1,116		33.5%
1920	1,130		1.3%
1930	1,306		15.6%
1940	1,223		−6.4%
1950	1,812		48.2%
1960	2,701		49.1%
1970	0		−100.0%
1980	5,127		—
1990	6,043		17.9%
2000	5,724		−5.3%
2010	3,929		−31.4%
U.S. Decennial Census; 1899 (shown as 1900) 1910-1930; 1930-1950 1980-2000 2010

== Features ==
After the rope bridge in Salto Abajo was destroyed by Hurricane Maria in 2017, engineering students from the University of New Mexico and University of Texas at El Paso began its reconstruction, but never completed the work.

== Gallery ==
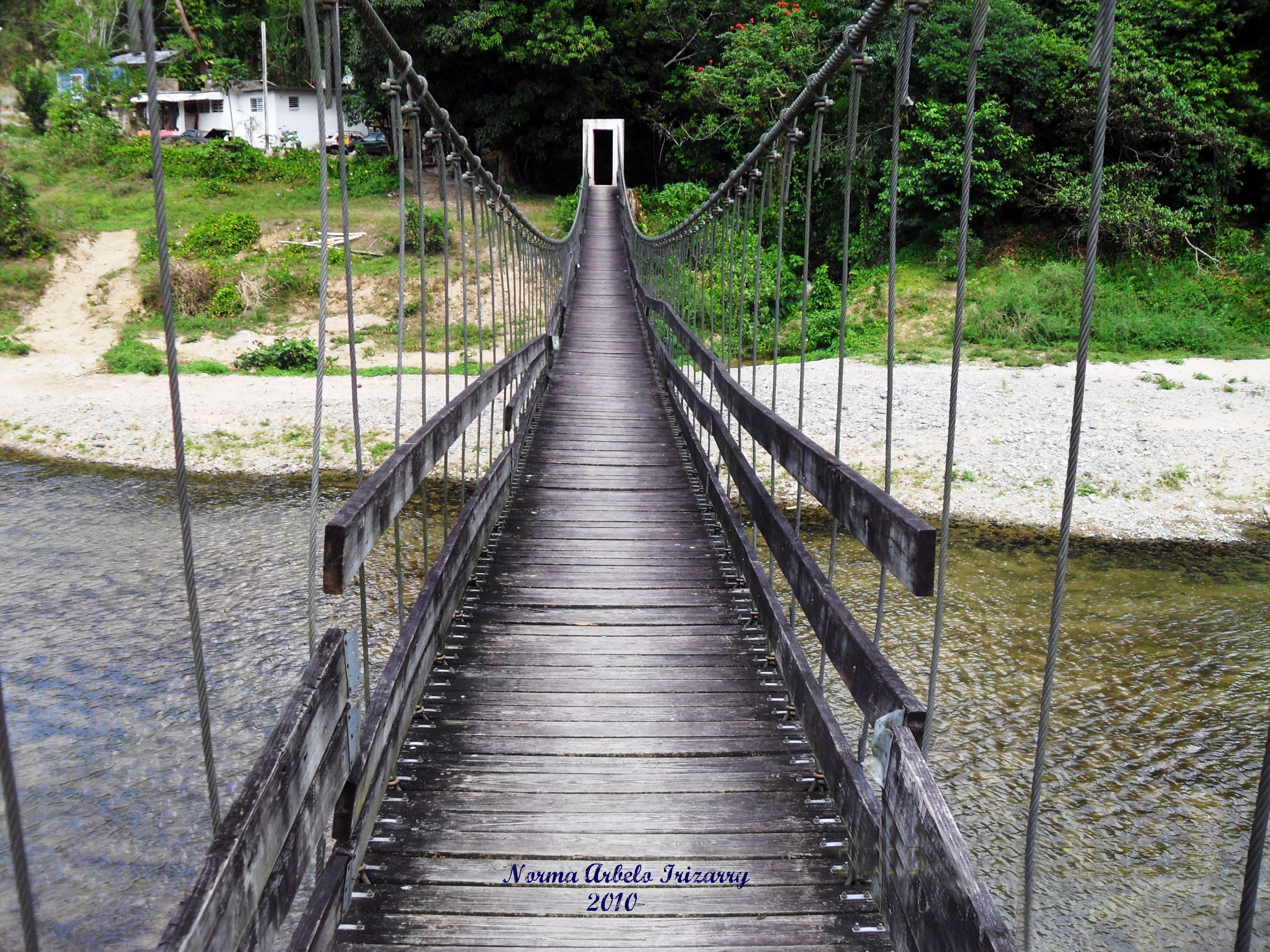
Puente La Hamaca in Salto Abajo, 2010

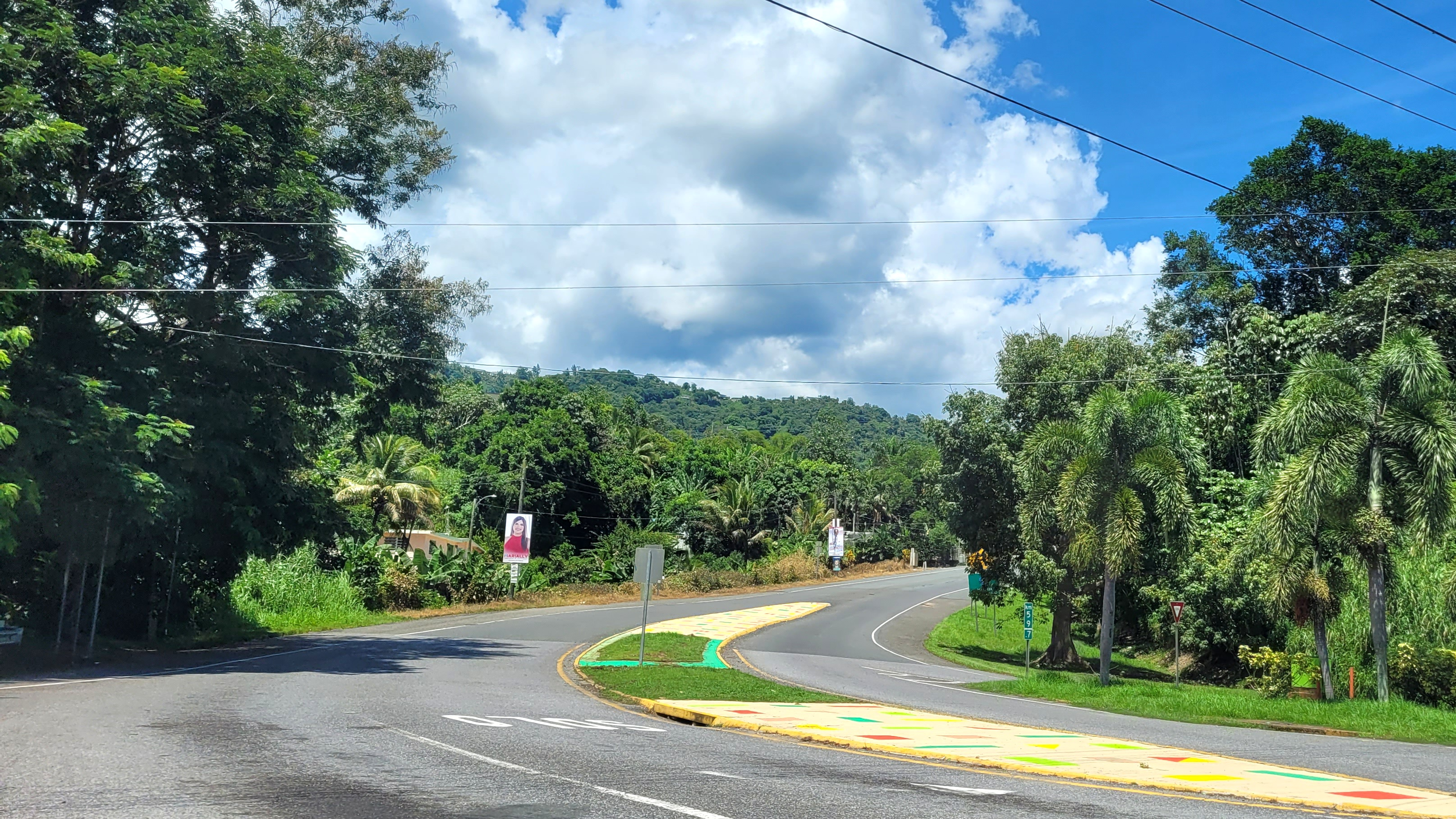
Puerto Rico Highway 111 in Salto Abajo

== See also ==
- List of communities in Puerto Rico
