= Piedras Blancas, San Sebastián, Puerto Rico =

Barrio of Puerto Rico

Piedras Blancas
- Barrio
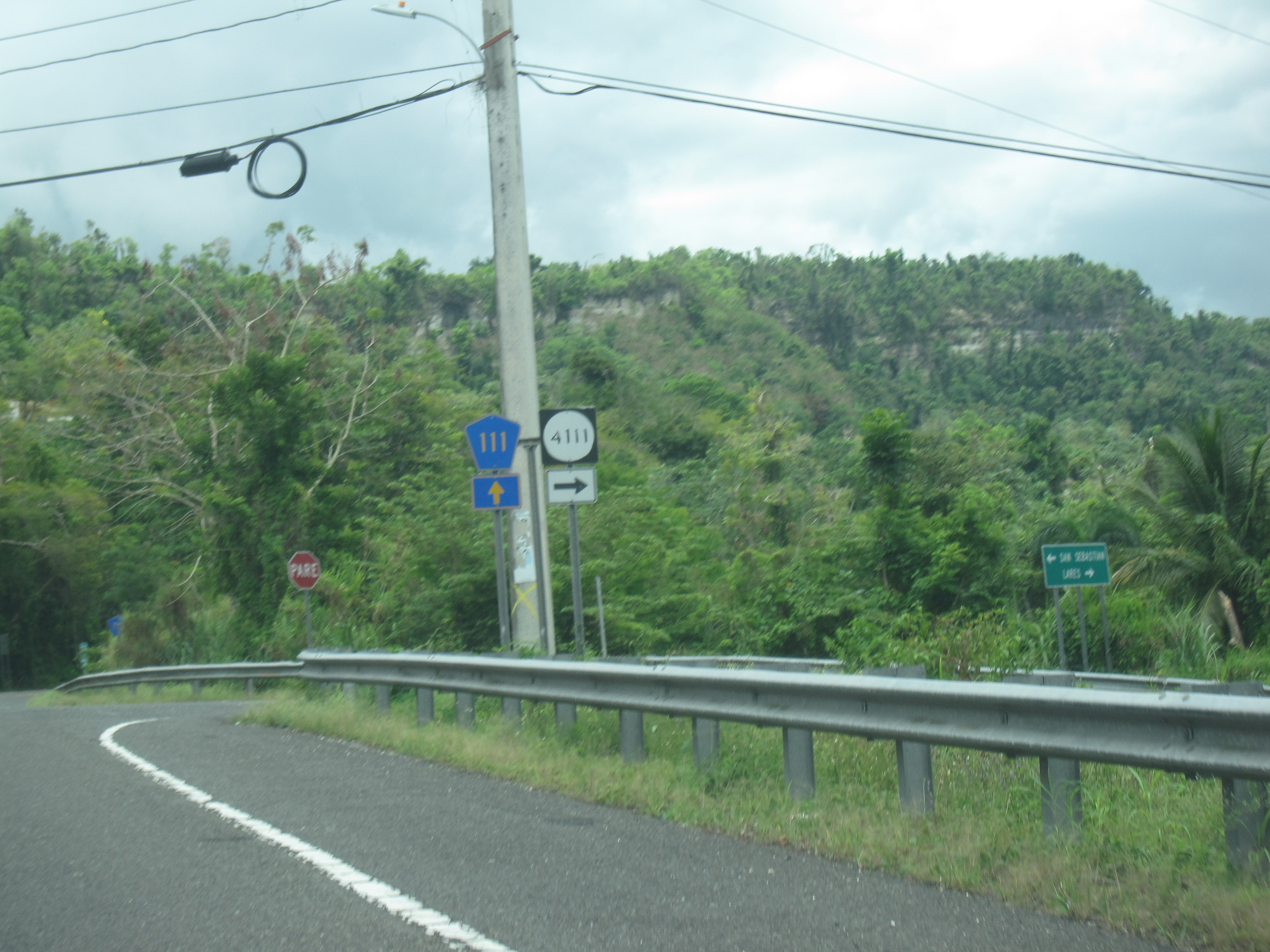
- Sign for PR-4111 to Piedras Blancas

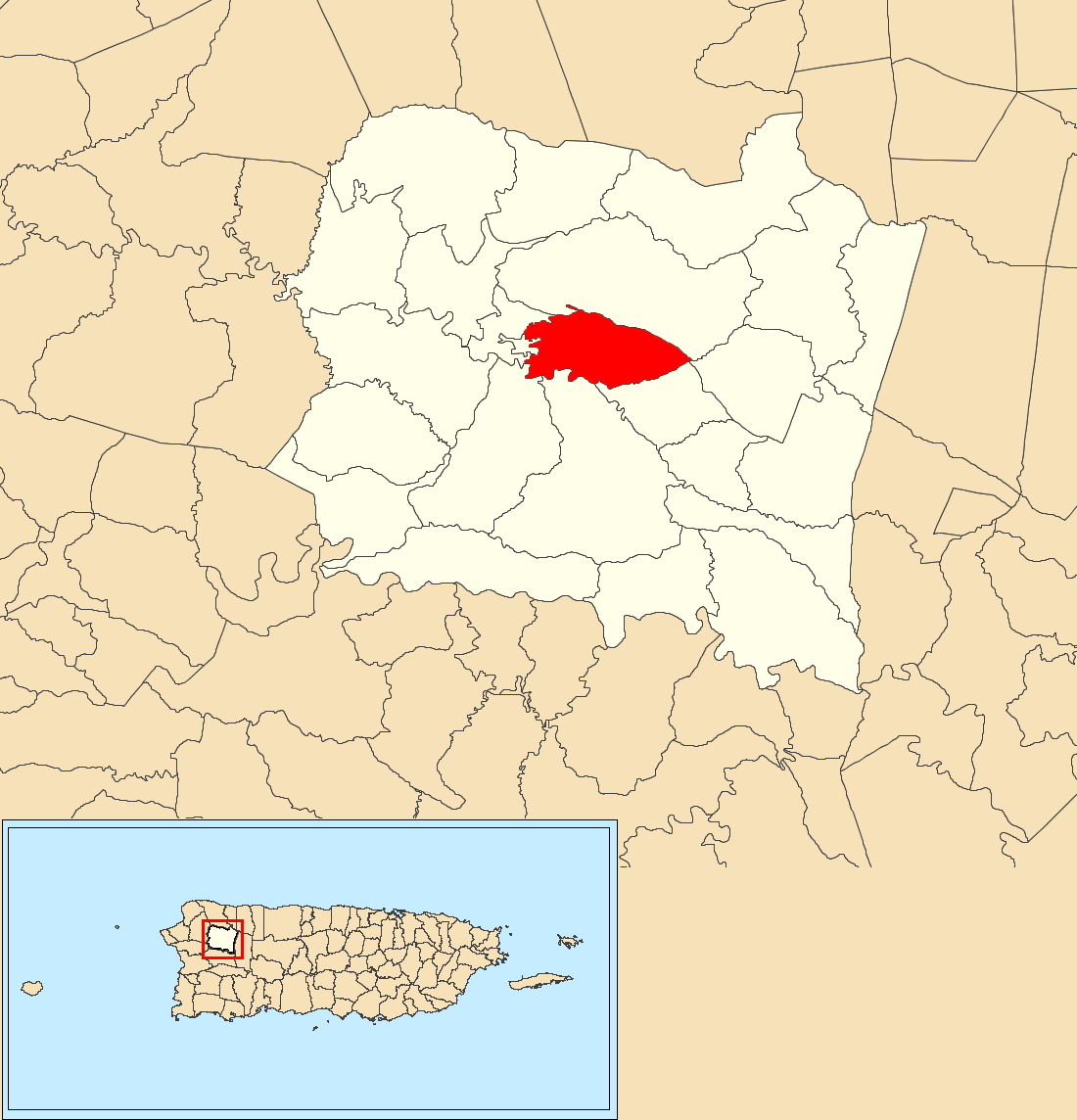
- Location of Piedras Blancas within the municipality of San Sebastián shown in red

- Location of Puerto Rico
- Coordinates: 18°20′08″N 66°58′17″W
- Commonwealth: Puerto Rico
- Municipality: San Sebastián

Area
  - Total: 2.2 sq mi (5.7 km^{2})
  - Land: 2.2 sq mi (5.7 km^{2})
  - Water: 0 sq mi (0 km^{2})
- Elevation: 423 ft (129 m)

Population (2010)
  - Total: 2,563
  - Density: 1,165/sq mi (450/km^{2})
- Source: 2010 Census
- Time zone: UTC−4 (AST)

Piedras Blancas is a barrio in the municipality of San Sebastián, Puerto Rico. Its population in 2010 was 2,563.

== History ==
Piedras Blancas was in Spain's gazetteers until Puerto Rico was ceded by Spain in the aftermath of the Spanish–American War under the terms of the Treaty of Paris of 1898 and became an unincorporated territory of the United States. In 1899, the United States Department of War conducted a census of Puerto Rico finding that the combined population of Cidral and Piedras Blancas barrios was 1,125.

Historical population
Census	Pop.	Note	%±
1910	976		—
1920	1,157		18.5%
1930	1,384		19.6%
1940	2,103		52.0%
1950	2,081		−1.0%
1960	2,245		7.9%
1970	0		−100.0%
1980	2,718		—
1990	2,269		−16.5%
2000	2,562		12.9%
2010	2,563		0.0%
U.S. Decennial Census; 1900 (N/A) 1910-1930; 1930-1950 1980-2000 2010

== Sectors ==
Barrios (which are, in contemporary times, roughly comparable to minor civil divisions) in turn are further subdivided into smaller local populated place areas/units called sectores (sectors in English). The types of sectores may vary, from normally sector to urbanización to reparto to barriada to residencial, among others.

The following sectors are in Piedras Blancas barrio:

Avenida Emérito Estrada Rivera, Barriada Segarra (Cuchilandia), Carretera 111, Carretera 119, Carretera 125, Sector Las Palmas (Escuela Bilingüe), Sector Lindín, Sector Los Pinos, Sector Tito Ríos, Urbanización Ubiñas, and Urbanización Valle Verde.

== See also ==
- List of communities in Puerto Rico
- List of barrios and sectors of San Sebastián, Puerto Rico
