= Voladoras =

Barrio of Moca, Puerto Rico

- Barrio
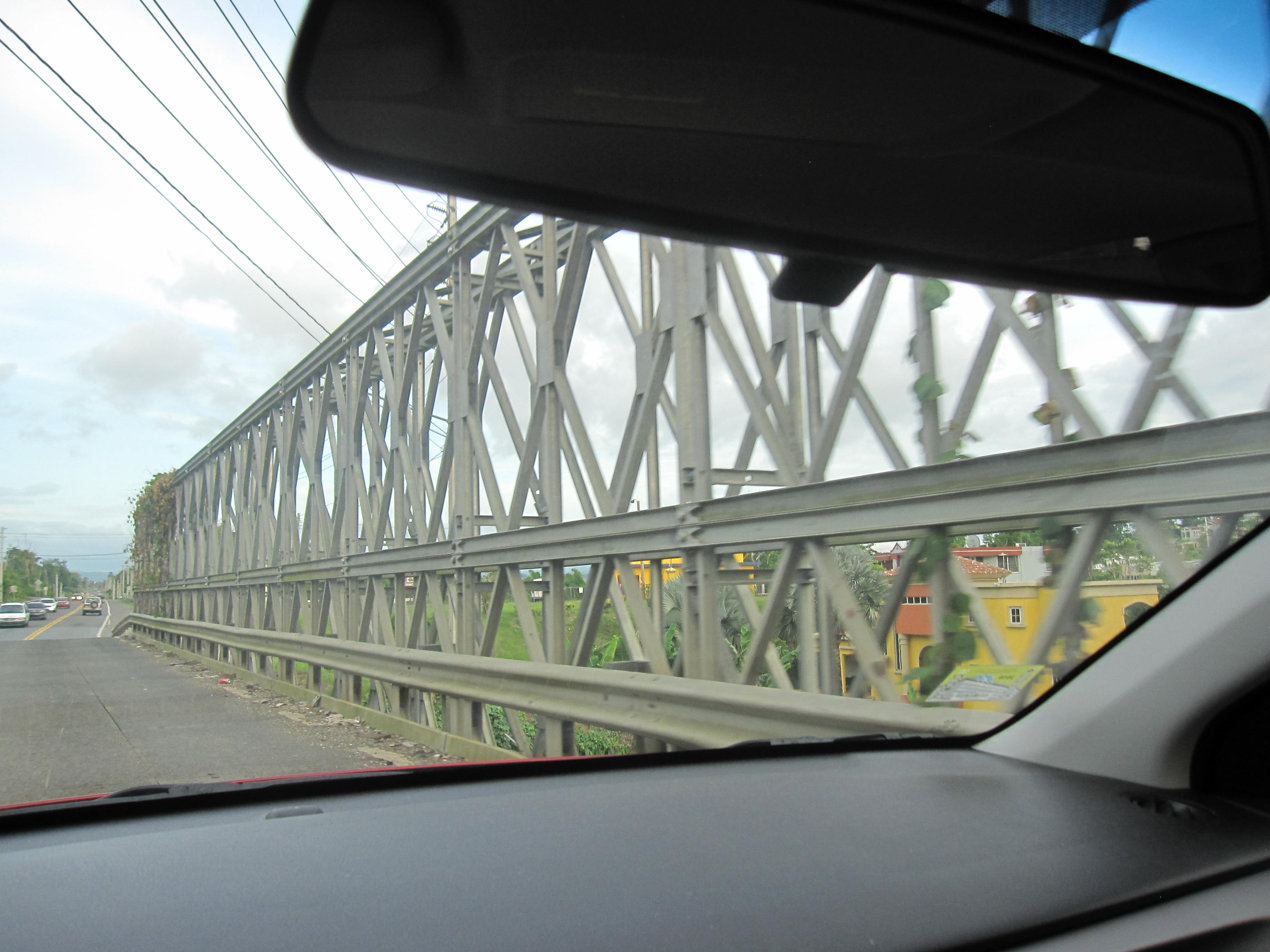
- Puerto Rico Highway 111 in Voladoras

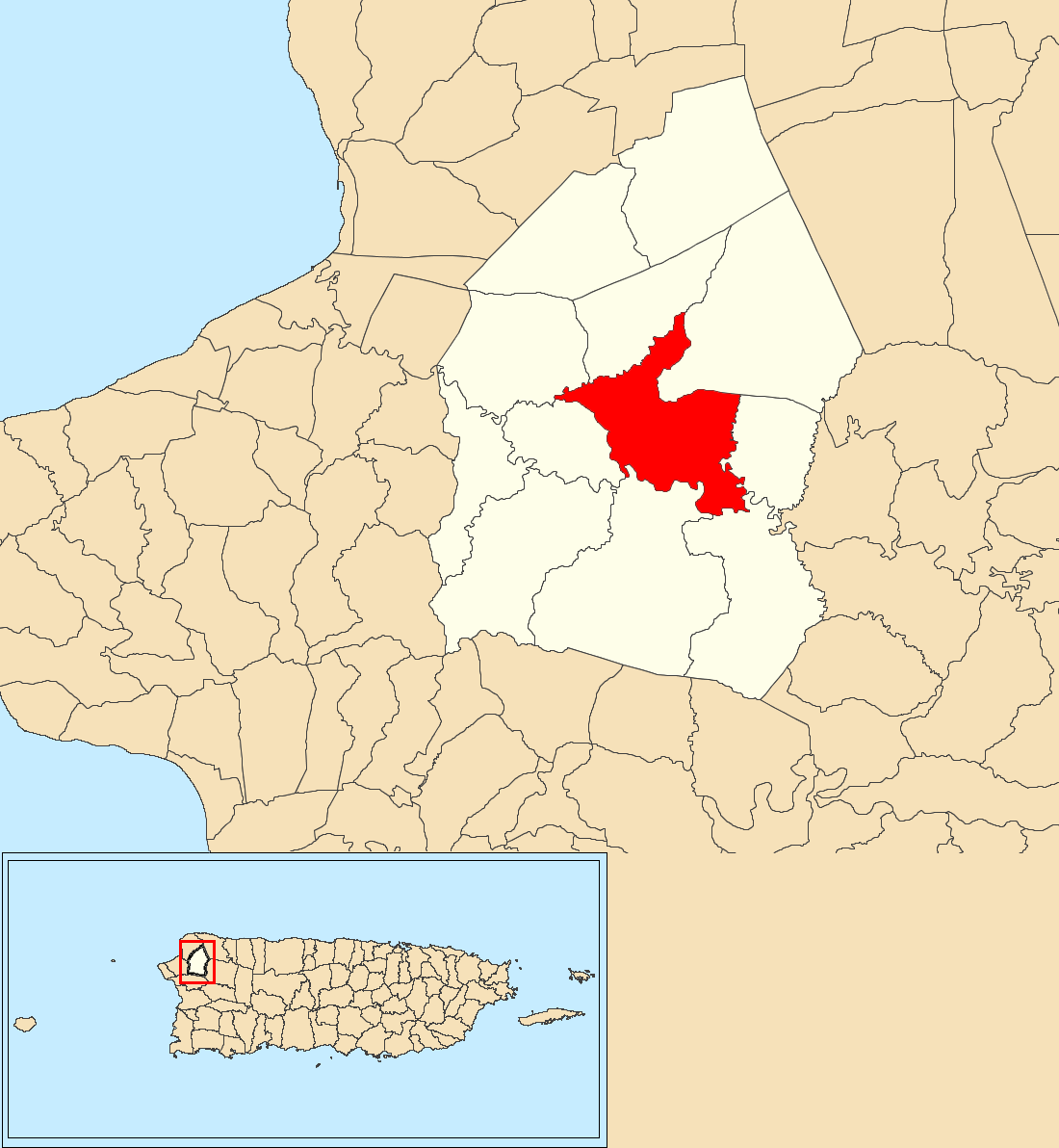
- Location of Voladoras within the municipality of Moca shown in red

- Location of Puerto Rico
- Coordinates: 18°22′29″N 67°04′33″W
- Commonwealth: Puerto Rico
- Municipality: Moca

Area
  - Total: 4.33 sq mi (11.2 km^{2})
  - Land: 4.33 sq mi (11.2 km^{2})
  - Water: 0 sq mi (0 km^{2})
- Elevation: 325 ft (99 m)

Population (2010)
  - Total: 4,710
  - Density: 1,087.8/sq mi (420.0/km^{2})
- Source: 2010 Census
- Time zone: UTC−4 (AST)

Voladoras is a barrio in the municipality of Moca, Puerto Rico. Its population in 2010 was 4,710.

== History ==
Voladoras was in Spain's gazetteers until Puerto Rico was ceded by Spain in the aftermath of the Spanish–American War under the terms of the Treaty of Paris of 1898 and became an unincorporated territory of the United States. In 1899, the United States Department of War conducted a census of Puerto Rico finding that the population of Voladoras barrio was 1,267.

Historical population
Census	Pop.	Note	%±
1900	1,267		—
1910	1,457		15.0%
1920	1,707		17.2%
1930	1,800		5.4%
1940	2,038		13.2%
1950	2,236		9.7%
1960	2,379		6.4%
1970	2,989		25.6%
1980	3,377		13.0%
1990	3,869		14.6%
2000	4,571		18.1%
2010	4,710		3.0%
U.S. Decennial Census; 1899 (shown as 1900) 1910-1930; 1930-1950 1960 1980-2000 2010

== Río Culebrinas flooding ==
In late May 2019, barrio Voladoras and multiple areas in various municipalities suffered flooding, felled trees, landslides and closed highways when Río Culebrinas flooded.

== See also ==
- List of communities in Puerto Rico
