= Cidral =

Barrio of San Sebastián, Puerto Rico

- Barrio
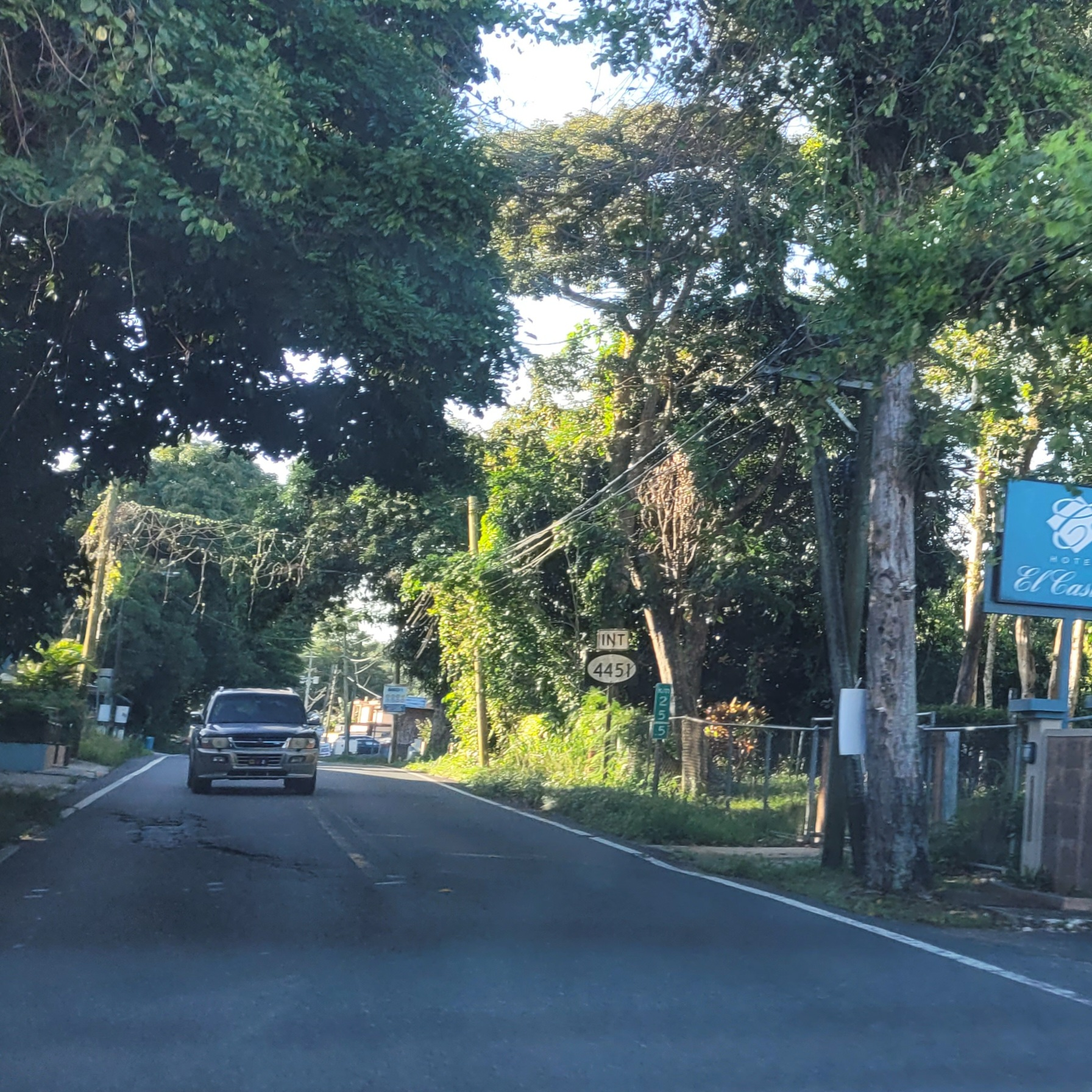
- Puerto Rico Highway 111 between Cidral and Eneas

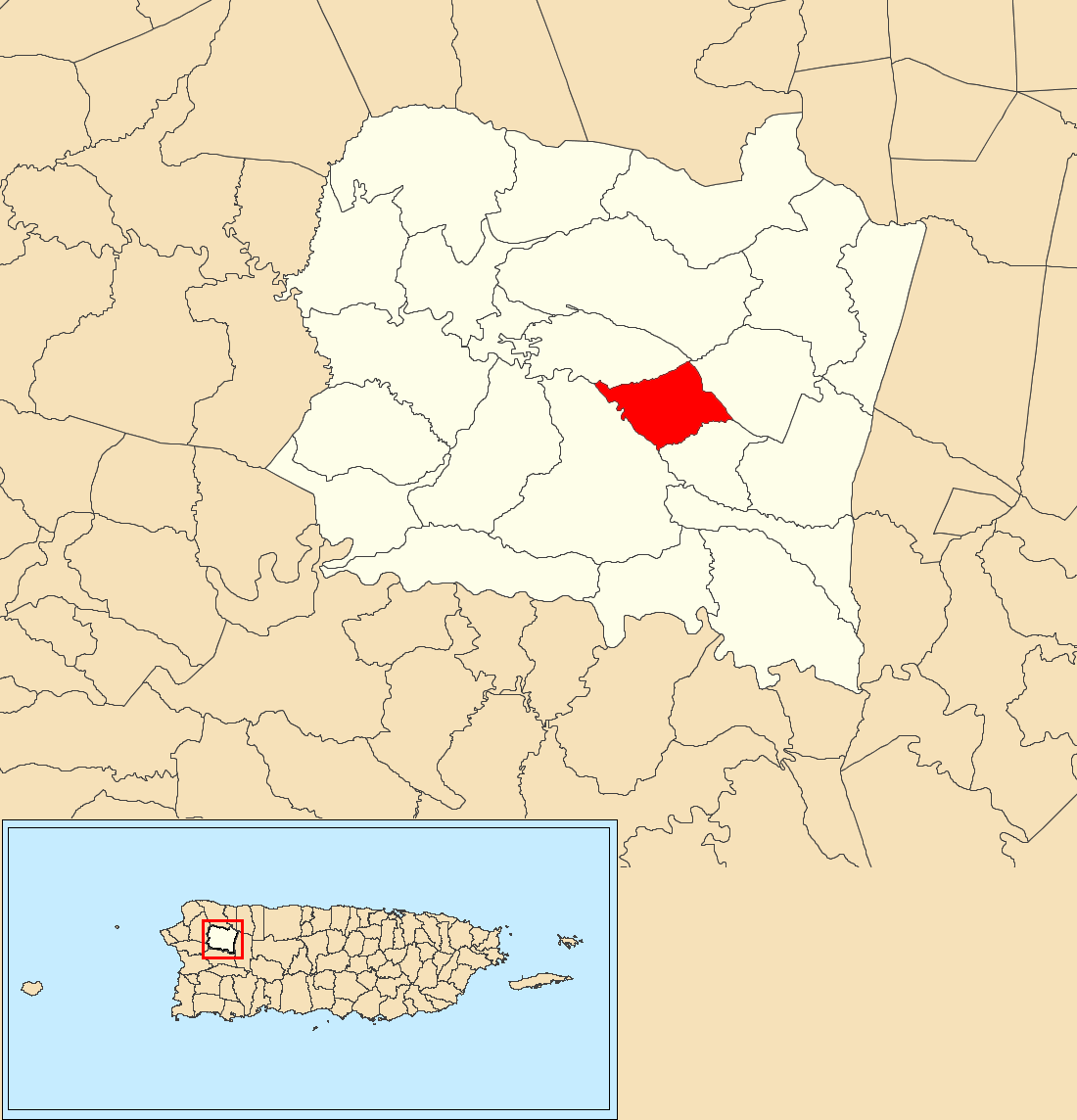
- Location of Cidral within the municipality of San Sebastián shown in red

- Location of Puerto Rico
- Coordinates: 18°19′19″N 66°57′17″W
- Commonwealth: Puerto Rico
- Municipality: San Sebastián

Area
  - Total: 1.58 sq mi (4.1 km^{2})
  - Land: 1.58 sq mi (4.1 km^{2})
  - Water: 0 sq mi (0 km^{2})
- Elevation: 561 ft (171 m)

Population (2010)
  - Total: 415
  - Density: 264.3/sq mi (102.0/km^{2})
- Source: 2010 Census
- Time zone: UTC−4 (AST)

Cidral is a barrio in the municipality of San Sebastián, Puerto Rico. Its population in 2010 was 415.

== History ==
Cidral was in Spain's gazetteers until Puerto Rico was ceded by Spain in the aftermath of the Spanish–American War under the terms of the Treaty of Paris of 1898 and became an unincorporated territory of the United States. In 1899, the United States Department of War conducted a census of Puerto Rico finding that the combined population of Cidral and Piedras Blancas barrios was 1,125.

Historical population
Census	Pop.	Note	%±
1910	401		—
1920	470		17.2%
1930	522		11.1%
1940	569		9.0%
1950	671		17.9%
1960	550		−18.0%
1970	529		−3.8%
1980	479		−9.5%
1990	429		−10.4%
2000	453		5.6%
2010	415		−8.4%
U.S. Decennial Census; 1900 (N/A) 1910-1930; 1930-1950 1980-2000 2010

== Sectors ==
Barrios (which are, in contemporary times, roughly comparable to minor civil divisions) in turn are further subdivided into smaller local populated place areas/units called sectores (sectors in English). The types of sectores may vary, from normally sector to urbanización to reparto to barriada to residencial, among others.

The following sectors are in Cidral barrio:

Carretera 450, Sector La Laguna, Sector Los Rosario, Sector Martínez, Sector Mín Pérez, Sector Nolo González, Sector Palmarito, Sector Pancho Soto, and Sector Tomassini.

== See also ==
- List of communities in Puerto Rico
- List of barrios and sectors of San Sebastián, Puerto Rico
