= Capá =

Barrio of Moca, Puerto Rico

- Barrio
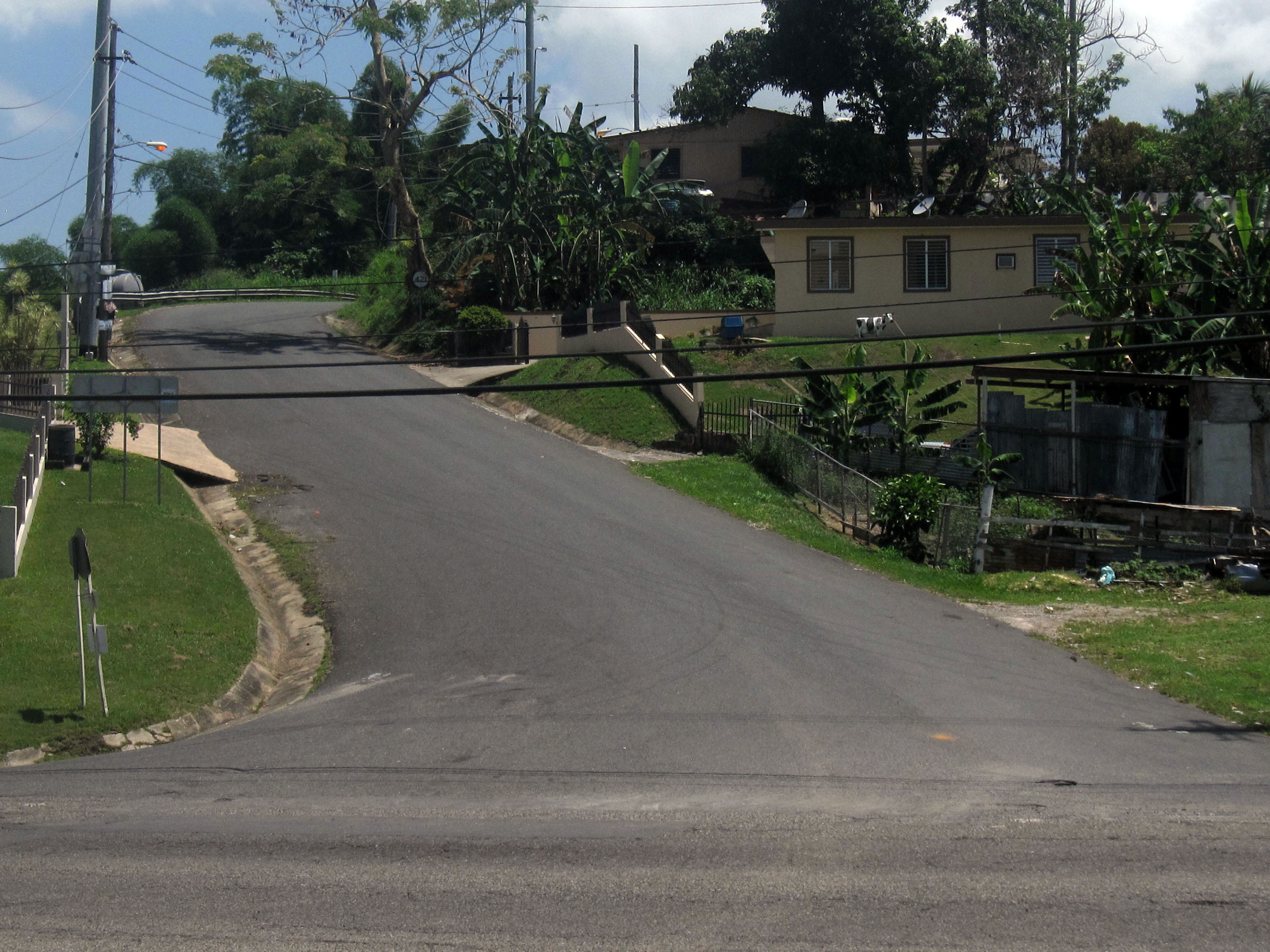
- PR-111 and PR-421 in Capá

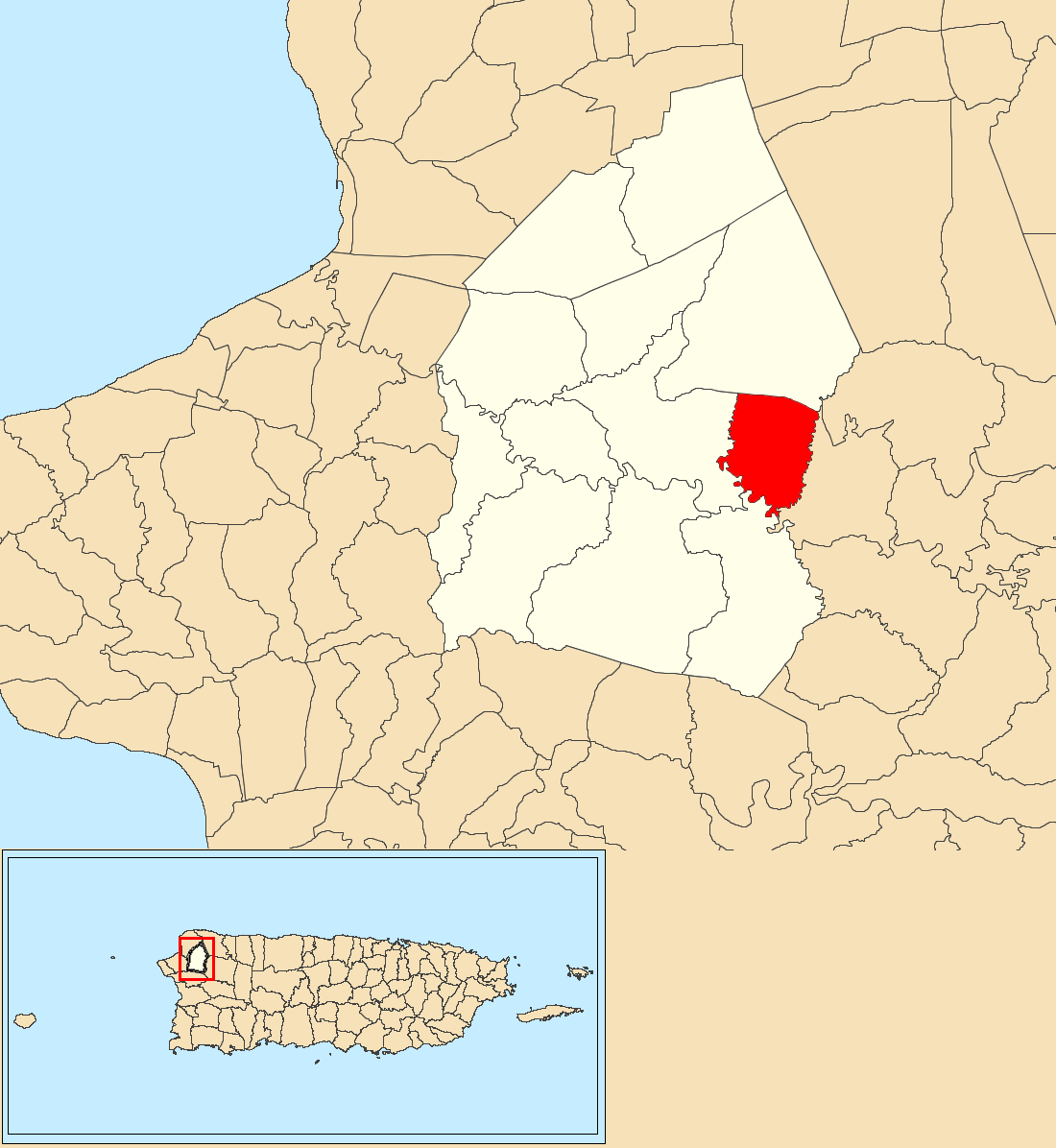
- Location of Capá within the municipality of Moca shown in red

- Location of Puerto Rico
- Coordinates: 18°22′07″N 67°02′58″W
- Commonwealth: Puerto Rico
- Municipality: Moca

Area
  - Total: 2.22 sq mi (5.7 km^{2})
  - Land: 2.22 sq mi (5.7 km^{2})
  - Water: 0 sq mi (0 km^{2})
- Elevation: 217 ft (66 m)

Population (2010)
  - Total: 3,747
  - Density: 1,687.8/sq mi (651.7/km^{2})
- Source: 2010 Census
- Time zone: UTC−4 (AST)

Capá is a barrio in the municipality of Moca, Puerto Rico with a population of 3,747 in 2010.

== History ==
Capá was in Spain's gazetteers until Puerto Rico was ceded by Spain in the aftermath of the Spanish–American War under the terms of the Treaty of Paris of 1898 and became an unincorporated territory of the United States. In 1899, the United States Department of War conducted a census of Puerto Rico finding that the population of Capá barrio was 898.

Historical population
| Census | Pop. | Note | %± |
|---|---|---|---|
| 1900 | 898 | | — |
| 1910 | 906 | | 0.9% |
| 1920 | 1,031 | | 13.8% |
| 1930 | 1,181 | | 14.5% |
| 1940 | 1,395 | | 18.1% |
| 1950 | 1,638 | | 17.4% |
| 1960 | 1,595 | | −2.6% |
| 1970 | 1,603 | | 0.5% |
| 1980 | 2,127 | | 32.7% |
| 1990 | 2,297 | | 8.0% |
| 2000 | 3,354 | | 46.0% |
| 2010 | 3,747 | | 11.7% |
U.S. Decennial Census; 1899 (shown as 1900) 1910-1930; 1930-1950 1960 1980-2000 2010

== Gallery ==
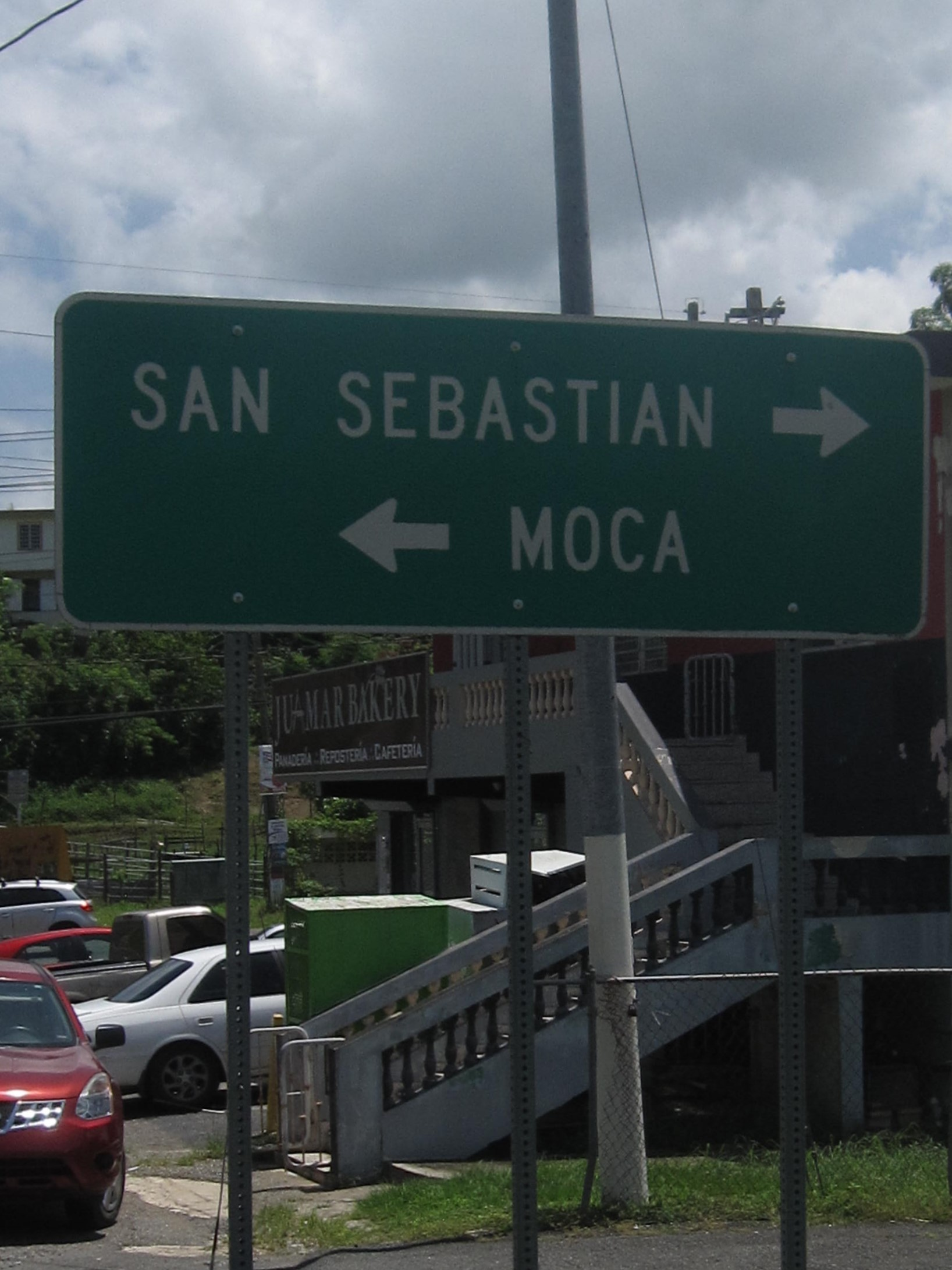
To San Sebastián or Moca, sign on PR-421, fronting PR-111 in Capá

== See also ==
- List of communities in Puerto Rico
