= Viví Arriba =

Barrio of Utuado, Puerto Rico

- Barrio
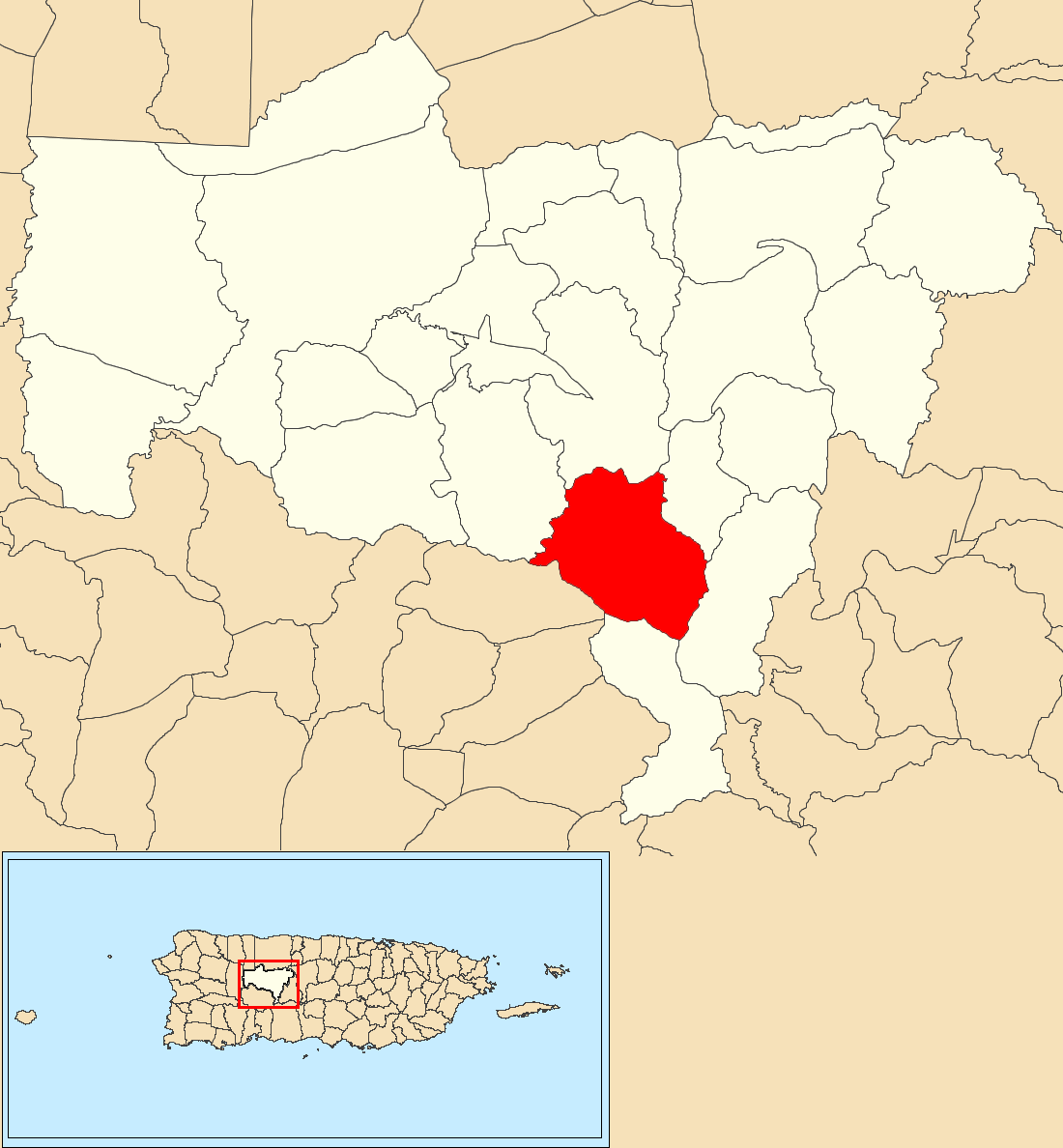
- Location of Viví Arriba within the municipality of Utuado shown in red

- Location of Puerto Rico
- Coordinates: 18°12′58″N 66°40′50″W
- Commonwealth: Puerto Rico
- Municipality: Utuado

Area
  - Total: 5.12 sq mi (13.3 km^{2})
  - Land: 5.11 sq mi (13.2 km^{2})
  - Water: 0.01 sq mi (0.026 km^{2})
- Elevation: 1,306 ft (398 m)

Population (2010)
  - Total: 748
  - Density: 146.4/sq mi (56.5/km^{2})
- Source: 2010 Census
- Time zone: UTC−4 (AST)

Viví Arriba is a barrio in the municipality of Utuado, Puerto Rico. Its population in 2010 was 748.

== Geography ==
Viví Arriba is situated at an elevation of 1,306 feet (398 m) and south of Viví Abajo, in Utuado. It has an area of 5.12 square miles (13.3 km^{2}) of which 0.01 square miles (0.026 km^{2}) is water.

== History ==
Viví Arriba was in Spain's gazetteers until Puerto Rico was ceded by Spain in the aftermath of the Spanish–American War under the terms of the Treaty of Paris of 1898 and became an unincorporated territory of the United States. In 1899, the United States Department of War conducted a census of Puerto Rico and found that the population of Viví Arriba barrio was 1,240.

Historical population
Census	Pop.	Note	%±
1900	1,240		—
1910	962		−22.4%
1920	1,370		42.4%
1930	1,164		−15.0%
1940	1,377		18.3%
1950	1,582		14.9%
1960	1,159		−26.7%
1970	1,064		−8.2%
1980	905		−14.9%
1990	763		−15.7%
2000	570		−25.3%
2010	748		31.2%
U.S. Decennial Census; 1899 (shown as 1900) 1910-1930; 1930-1950 1980-2000 2010

== See also ==
- List of communities in Puerto Rico
