= Las Palmas, Utuado, Puerto Rico =

Barrio of Puerto Rico

Las Palmas
- Barrio
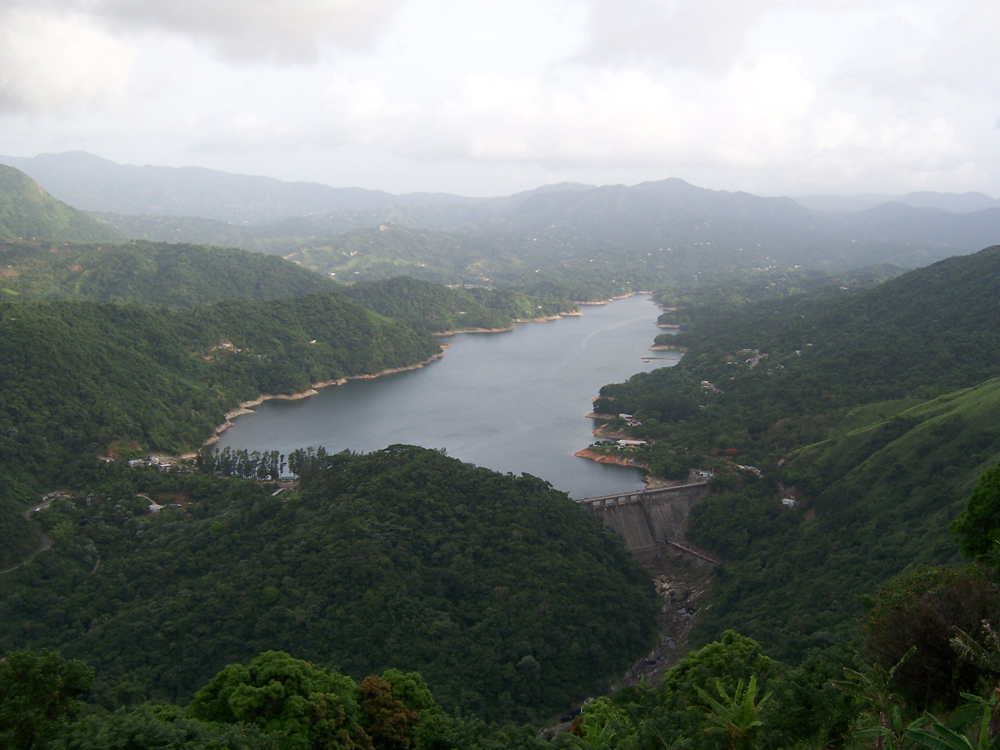
- Lago Caonillas within Barrios Caonillas Abajo, Caonillas Arriba, and Las Palmas

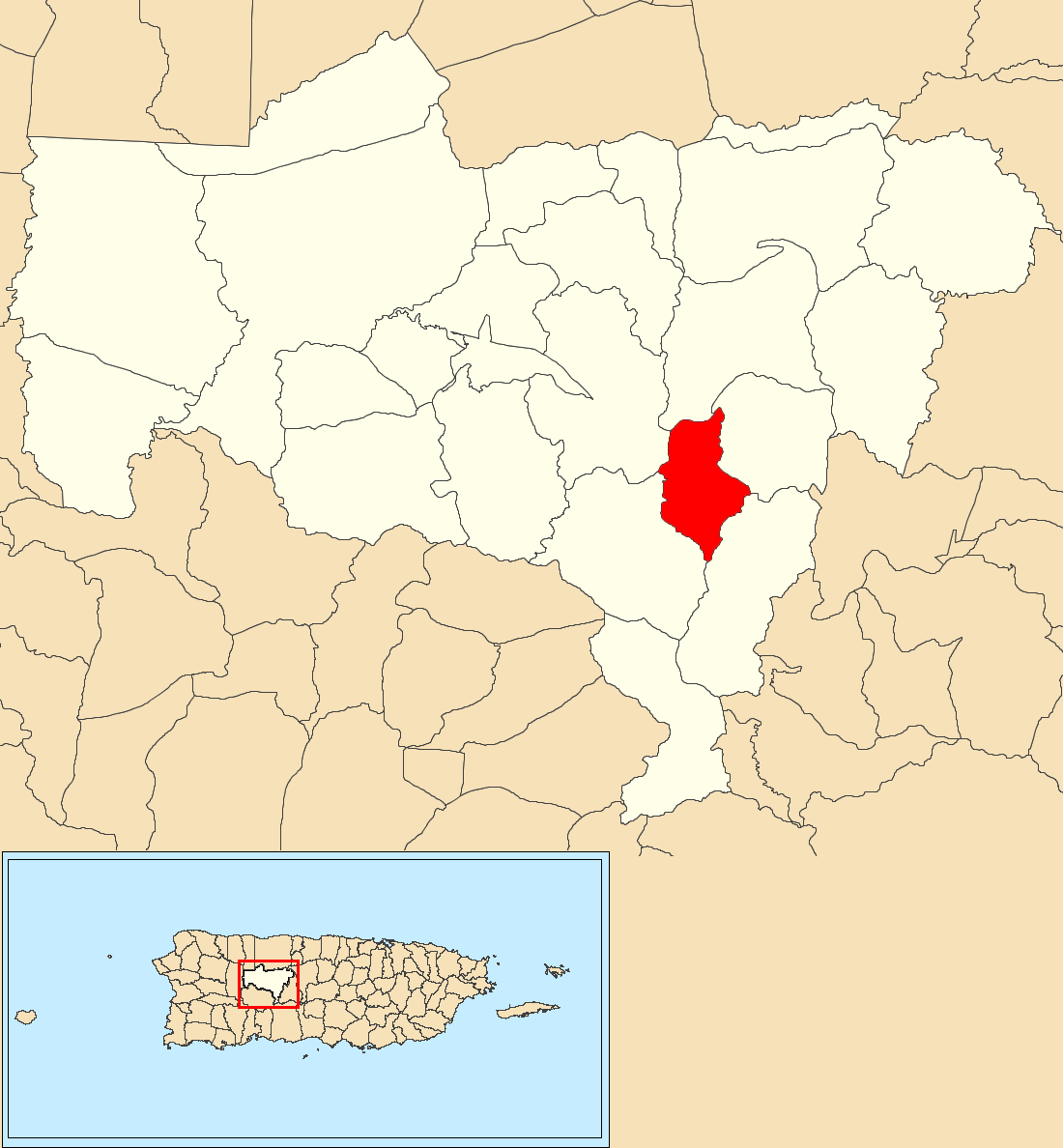
- Location of Las Palmas within the municipality of Utuado shown in red

- Location of Puerto Rico
- Coordinates: 18°14′08″N 66°39′25″W
- Commonwealth: Puerto Rico
- Municipality: Utuado

Area
  - Total: 2.17 sq mi (5.6 km^{2})
  - Land: 2.09 sq mi (5.4 km^{2})
  - Water: 0.08 sq mi (0.21 km^{2})
- Elevation: 1,122 ft (342 m)

Population (2010)
  - Total: 1,153
  - Density: 554.3/sq mi (214.0/km^{2})
- Source: 2010 Census
- Time zone: UTC−4 (AST)

Las Palmas is a barrio in the municipality of Utuado, Puerto Rico. Its population in 2010 was 1,153.

== History ==
Las Palmas was in Spain's gazetteers until Puerto Rico was ceded by Spain in the aftermath of the Spanish–American War under the terms of the Treaty of Paris of 1898 and became an unincorporated territory of the United States. In 1899, the United States Department of War conducted a census of Puerto Rico finding that the population of Las Palmas barrio was 647.

Historical population
Census	Pop.	Note	%±
1900	647		—
1910	609		−5.9%
1920	444		−27.1%
1930	777		75.0%
1940	940		21.0%
1950	1,271		35.2%
1960	795		−37.5%
1970	795		0.0%
1980	1,026		29.1%
1990	1,111		8.3%
2000	1,235		11.2%
2010	1,153		−6.6%
U.S. Decennial Census; 1899 (shown as 1900) 1910-1930; 1930-1950 1980-2000 2010

== See also ==
- List of communities in Puerto Rico
