= Viví Abajo =

Barrio of Utuado, Puerto Rico

- Barrio
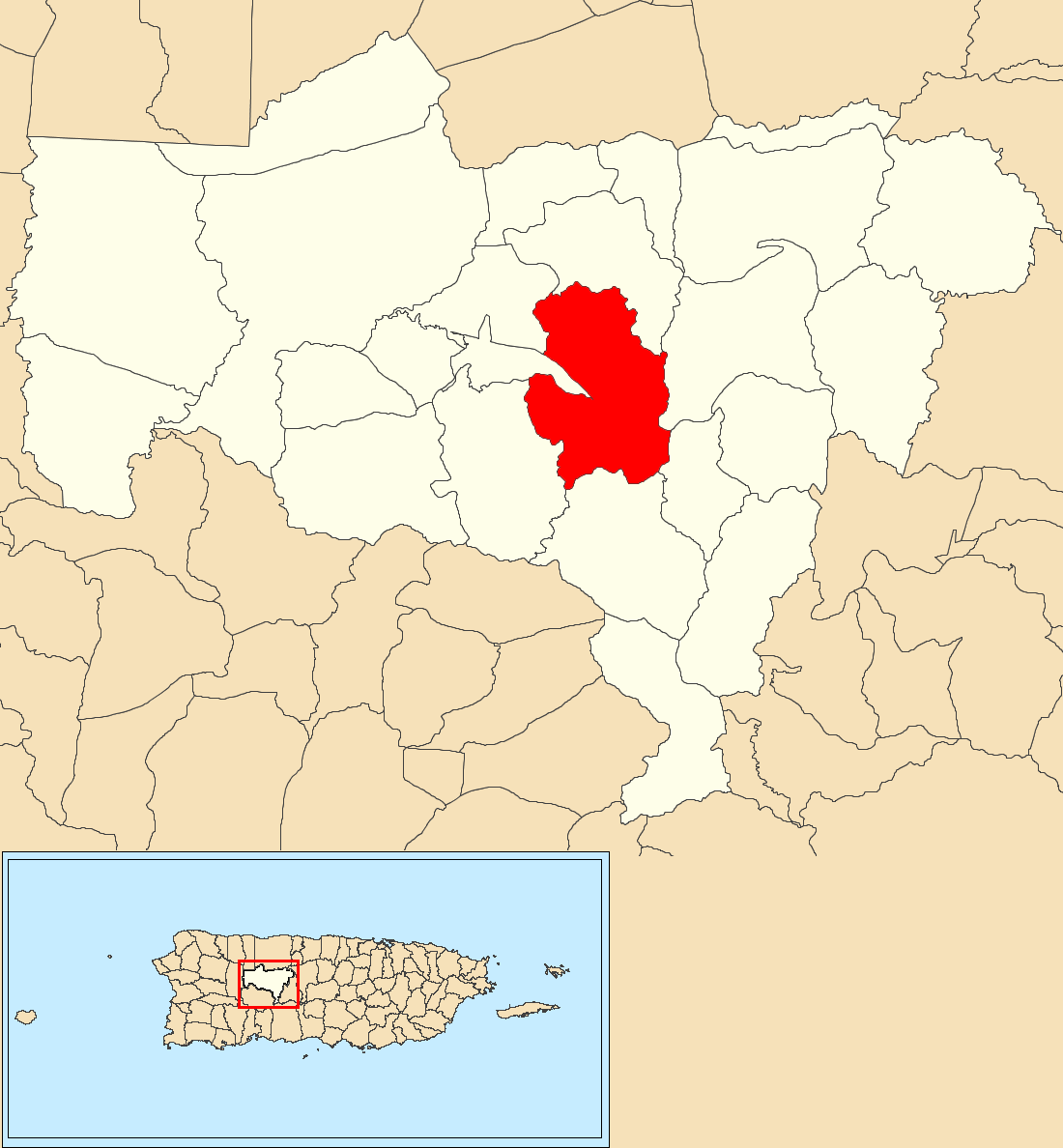
- Location of Viví Abajo within the municipality of Utuado shown in red

- Location of Puerto Rico
- Coordinates: 18°15′34″N 66°40′58″W
- Commonwealth: Puerto Rico
- Municipality: Utuado

Area
  - Total: 5.75 sq mi (14.9 km^{2})
  - Land: 5.75 sq mi (14.9 km^{2})
  - Water: 0 sq mi (0 km^{2})
- Elevation: 627 ft (191 m)

Population (2010)
  - Total: 3,143
  - Density: 546.6/sq mi (211.0/km^{2})
- Source: 2010 Census
- Time zone: UTC−4 (AST)

Viví Abajo is a barrio in the municipality of Utuado, Puerto Rico. Its population in 2010 was 3,143.

== Geography ==
Viví Abajo is situated at an elevation of 627 feet (191 m) north of Viví Arriba in Utuado, Puerto Rico. It has an area of 5.75 square miles (14.9 km^{2}).

== History ==
Viví Abajo was in Spain's gazetteers until Puerto Rico was ceded by Spain in the aftermath of the Spanish–American War under the terms of the Treaty of Paris of 1898 and became an unincorporated territory of the United States. In 1899, the United States Department of War conducted a census of Puerto Rico finding that the population of Viví Abajo barrio was 1,253.

Historical population
Census	Pop.	Note	%±
1900	1,253		—
1910	1,591		27.0%
1920	2,119		33.2%
1930	2,797		32.0%
1940	3,403		21.7%
1950	3,551		4.3%
1960	2,518		−29.1%
1970	0		−100.0%
1980	2,235		—
1990	2,823		26.3%
2000	2,817		−0.2%
2010	3,143		11.6%
U.S. Decennial Census; 1899 (shown as 1900) 1910-1930; 1930-1950 1980-2000 2010

== Hurricane Maria ==
Viví Abajo sustained significant damage to roads and homes from Hurricane Maria on September 20, 2017.

== See also ==
- List of communities in Puerto Rico
