= Ángeles, Utuado, Puerto Rico =

Barrio of Puerto Rico

Ángeles
- Barrio
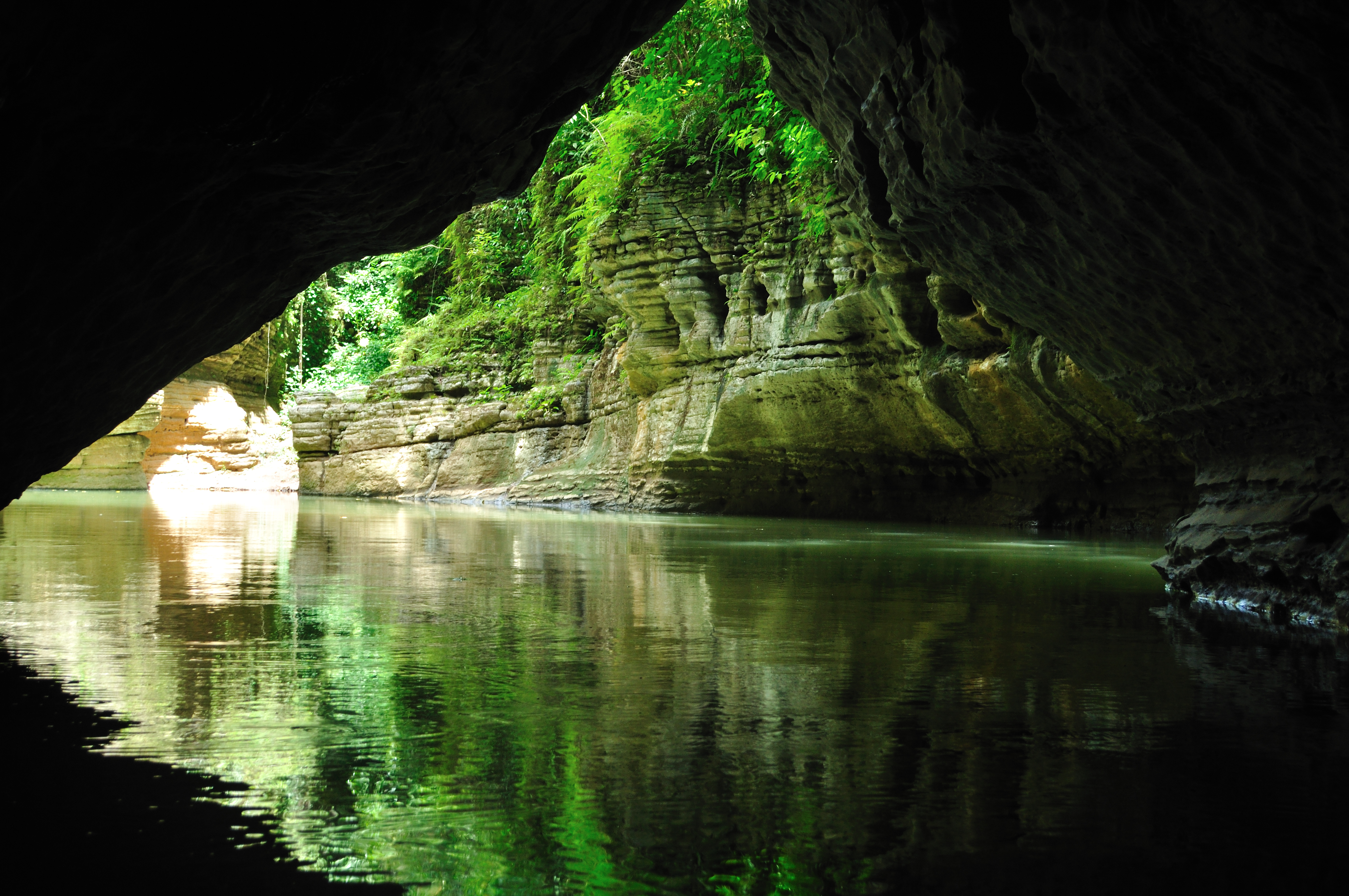
- Cave and Tanamá River in Ángeles barrio

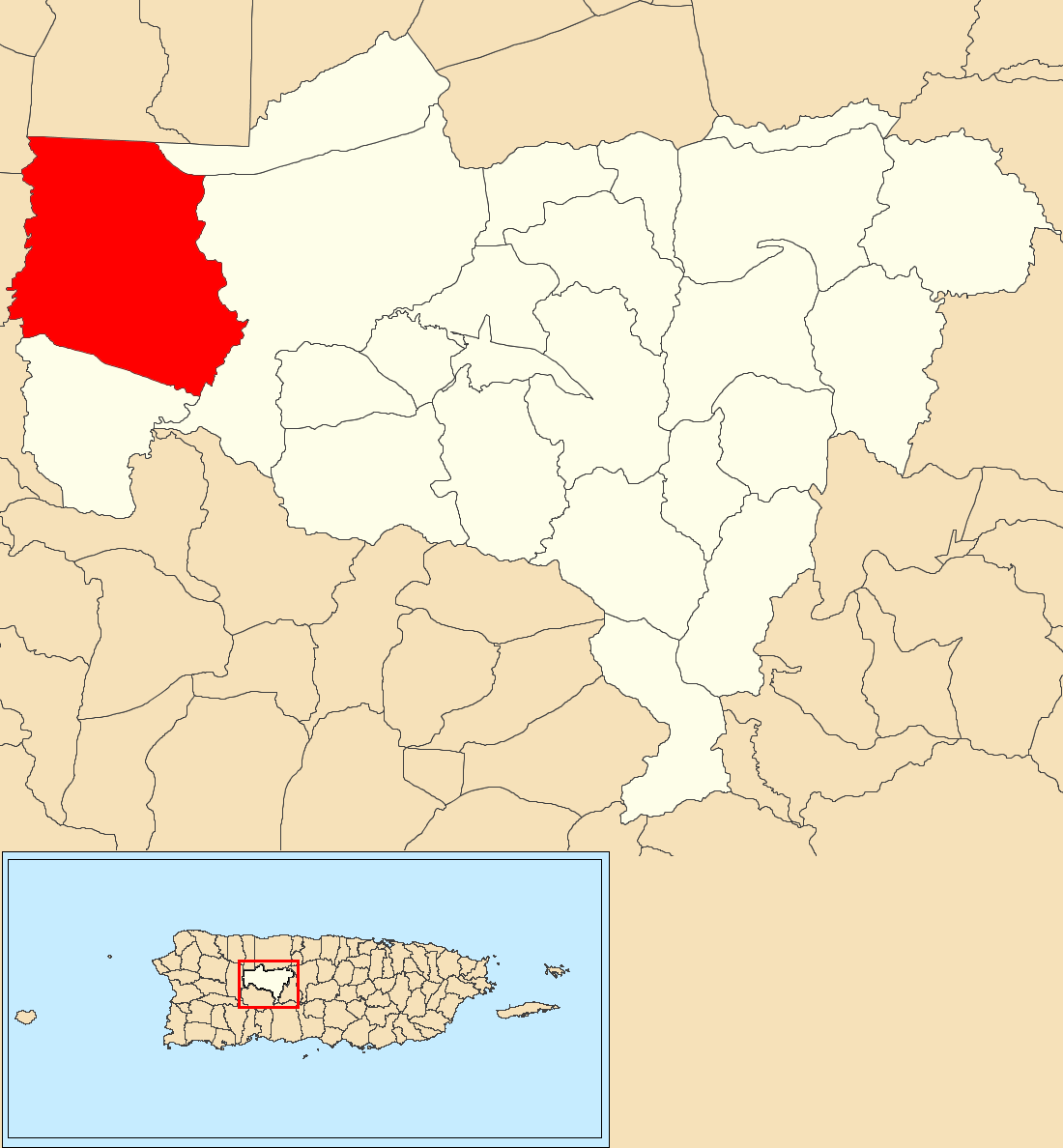
- Location of Ángeles within the municipality of Utuado shown in red

- Location of Puerto Rico
- Coordinates: 18°17′25″N 66°47′49″W
- Commonwealth: Puerto Rico
- Municipality: Utuado

Area
  - Total: 11.91 sq mi (30.8 km^{2})
  - Land: 11.89 sq mi (30.8 km^{2})
  - Water: 0.02 sq mi (0.052 km^{2})
- Elevation: 1,276 ft (389 m)

Population (2010)
  - Total: 3,056
  - Density: 257/sq mi (99/km^{2})
- Source: 2010 Census
- Time zone: UTC−4 (AST)

Ángeles is a barrio in the municipality of Utuado, Puerto Rico. Its population in 2010 was 3,056.

== Geography ==
Ángeles is situated at an elevation of 1,276 feet (389 m) west of Caguana in Utuado, Puerto Rico. It has an area of 11.91 square miles (30.8 km^{2}) of which 0.02 square miles (0.052 km^{2}) is water.

== History ==
Ángeles was in Spain's gazetteer until Puerto Rico was ceded by Spain in the aftermath of the Spanish–American War under the terms of the Treaty of Paris of 1898 and became an unincorporated territory of the United States. In 1899, the United States Department of War conducted a census of Puerto Rico finding that the population of Ángeles barrio was 2,456.

Historical population
| Census | Pop. | Note | %± |
|---|---|---|---|
| 1900 | 2,456 | | — |
| 1910 | 2,593 | | 5.6% |
| 1920 | 2,733 | | 5.4% |
| 1930 | 2,906 | | 6.3% |
| 1940 | 3,562 | | 22.6% |
| 1950 | 3,620 | | 1.6% |
| 1960 | 3,520 | | −2.8% |
| 1970 | 2,817 | | −20.0% |
| 1980 | 2,817 | | 0.0% |
| 1990 | 2,976 | | 5.6% |
| 2000 | 3,457 | | 16.2% |
| 2010 | 3,056 | | −11.6% |
U.S. Decennial Census; 1899 (shown as 1900) 1910-1930; 1930-1950 1980-2000 2010

== Gallery ==
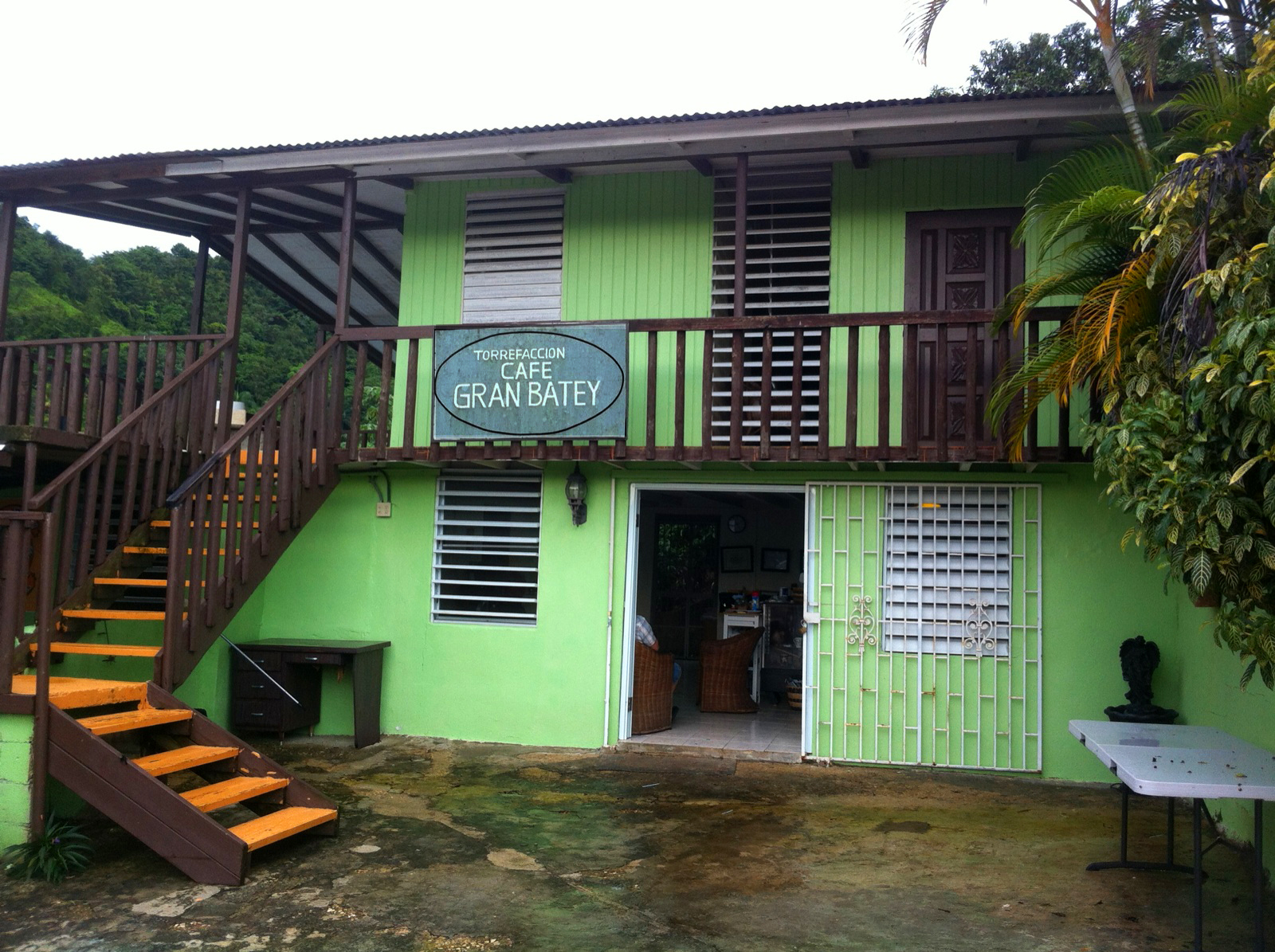
Café el Gran Batey (coffee roasting)

== See also ==
- List of communities in Puerto Rico
