= Salto Arriba =

Barrio of Utuado, Puerto Rico

- Barrio
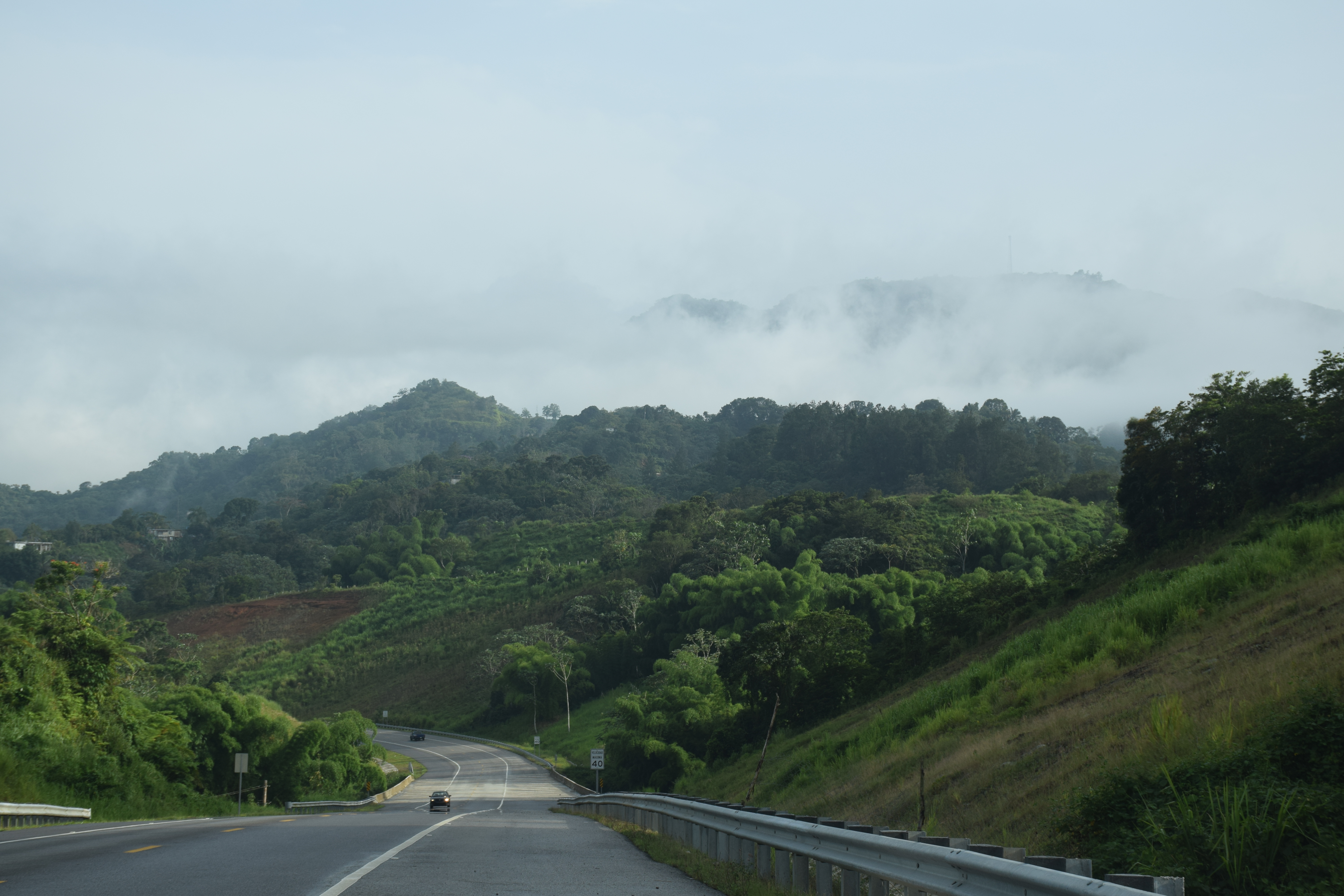
- Salto Arriba

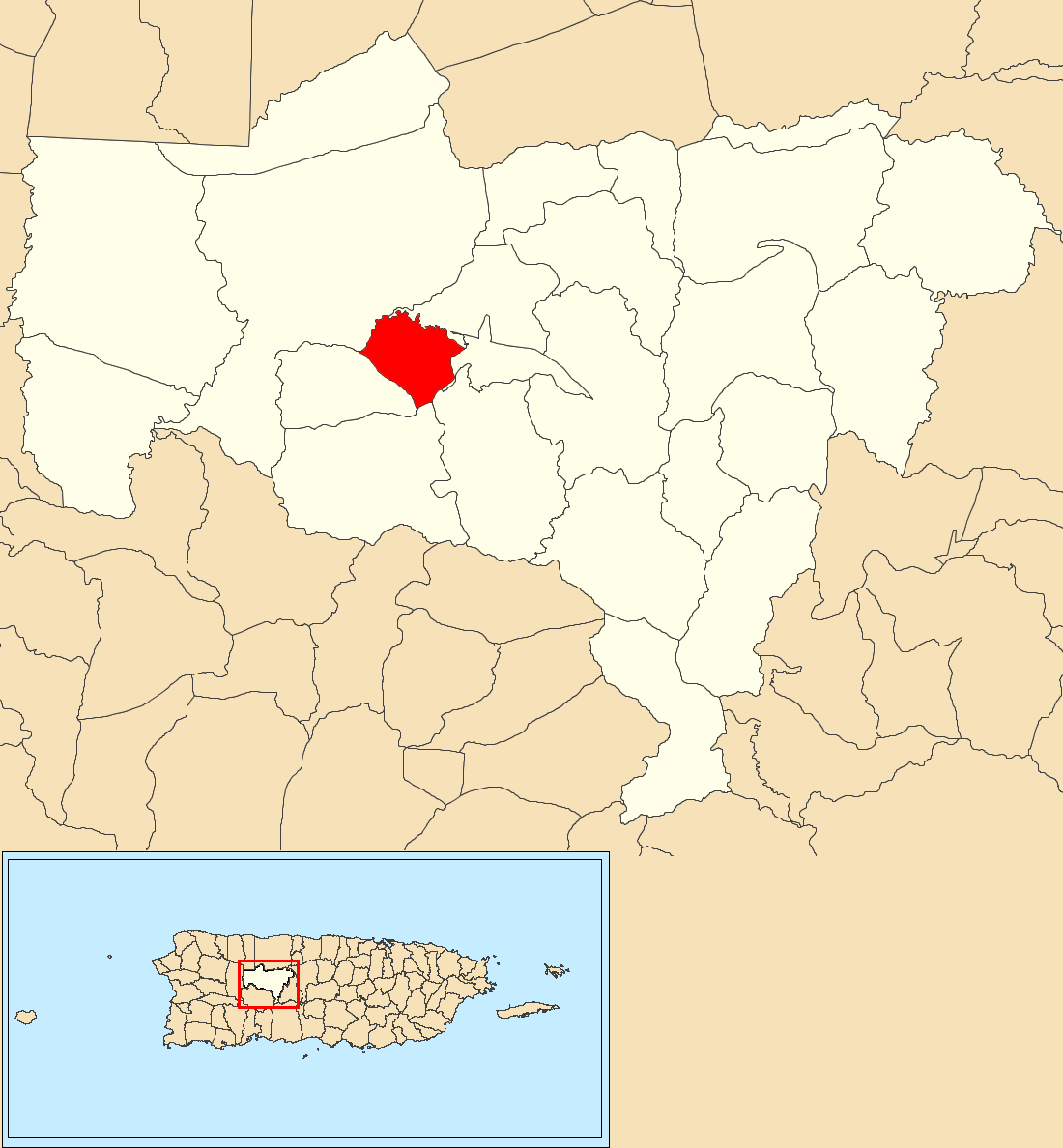
- Location of Salto Arriba within the municipality of Utuado shown in red

- Location of Puerto Rico
- Coordinates: 18°16′06″N 66°43′45″W
- Commonwealth: Puerto Rico
- Municipality: Utuado

Area
  - Total: 1.59 sq mi (4.1 km^{2})
  - Land: 1.59 sq mi (4.1 km^{2})
  - Water: 0 sq mi (0 km^{2})
- Elevation: 702 ft (214 m)

Population (2010)
  - Total: 617
  - Density: 388.1/sq mi (149.8/km^{2})
- Source: 2010 Census
- Time zone: UTC−4 (AST)
- ZIP Codes: 00641, 00611
- Area code: 787/939

Salto Arriba is a barrio in the municipality of Utuado, Puerto Rico. Its population in 2010 was 617.

== Geography ==
Salto Arriba is situated at an elevation of 702 feet (214 m) in central Utuado, just west of Utuado pueblo in Puerto Rico. It has an area of 1.59 square miles (4.1 km^{2}).

== History ==
Salto Arriba was in Spain's gazetteers until Puerto Rico was ceded by Spain in the aftermath of the Spanish–American War under the terms of the Treaty of Paris of 1898 and became an unincorporated territory of the United States. In 1899, the United States Department of War conducted a census of Puerto Rico finding that the population of Salto Arriba barrio was 855.

Historical population
Census	Pop.	Note	%±
1900	855		—
1910	1,076		25.8%
1920	1,248		16.0%
1930	1,579		26.5%
1940	1,775		12.4%
1950	813		−54.2%
1960	366		−55.0%
1970	391		6.8%
1980	435		11.3%
1990	368		−15.4%
2000	442		20.1%
2010	617		39.6%
U.S. Decennial Census; 1899 (shown as 1900) 1910-1930; 1930-1950 1980-2000 2010

There is a bridge over the Río Grande on PR-123 in Salto Arriba that is prone to collapse with heavy rains. A temporary bridge washed away with flooding from Hurricane Fiona on September 18, 2022. It was a temporary structure which had been built after Hurricane Maria on September 20, 2017 washed away the original bridge.

== See also ==
- List of communities in Puerto Rico
