= Puerto Rico Highway 438 =

Highway in Puerto Rico

Highway 438
- Ruta 438

Route information
- Maintained by Puerto Rico DTPW
- Length: 1.7 km (1.1 mi)

Major junctions
- West end: PR-111 in Eneas–Cidral–Magos
- East end: Barrio Juncal

Location
- Country: United States
- Territory: Puerto Rico
- Municipalities: San Sebastián

Highway system
- Roads in Puerto Rico; List
← PR-413	→ PR-462

Puerto Rico Highway 438 (PR-438) is a rural road located entirely in the municipality of San Sebastián, Puerto Rico. With a length of 1.7 kilometers (1.1 mi), it begins at its intersection with PR-111 on the Eneas–Cidral–Magos tripoint, and ends near PR-111 in Juncal barrio.

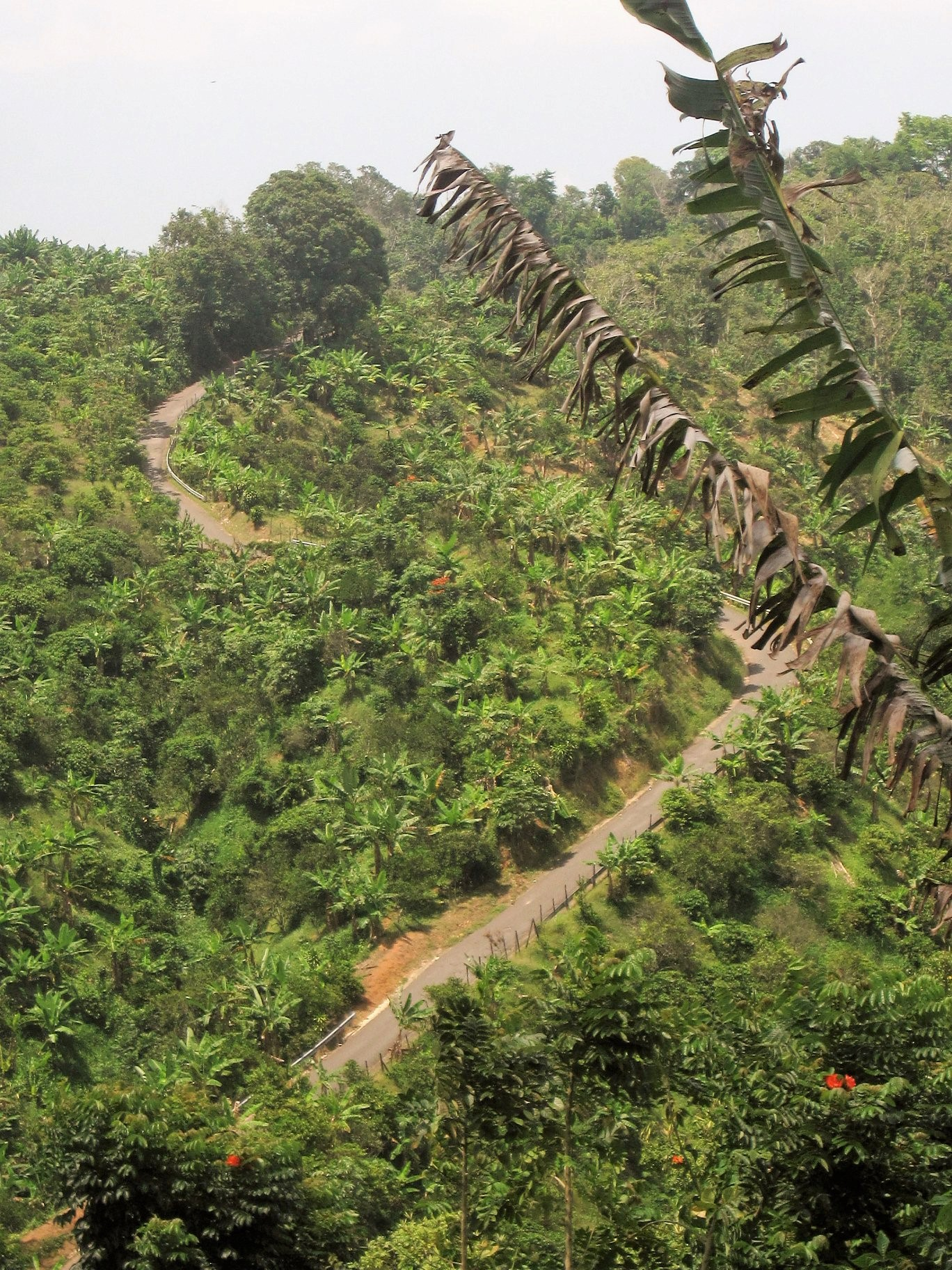
Cuesta de Magos (PR-438) in Magos barrio

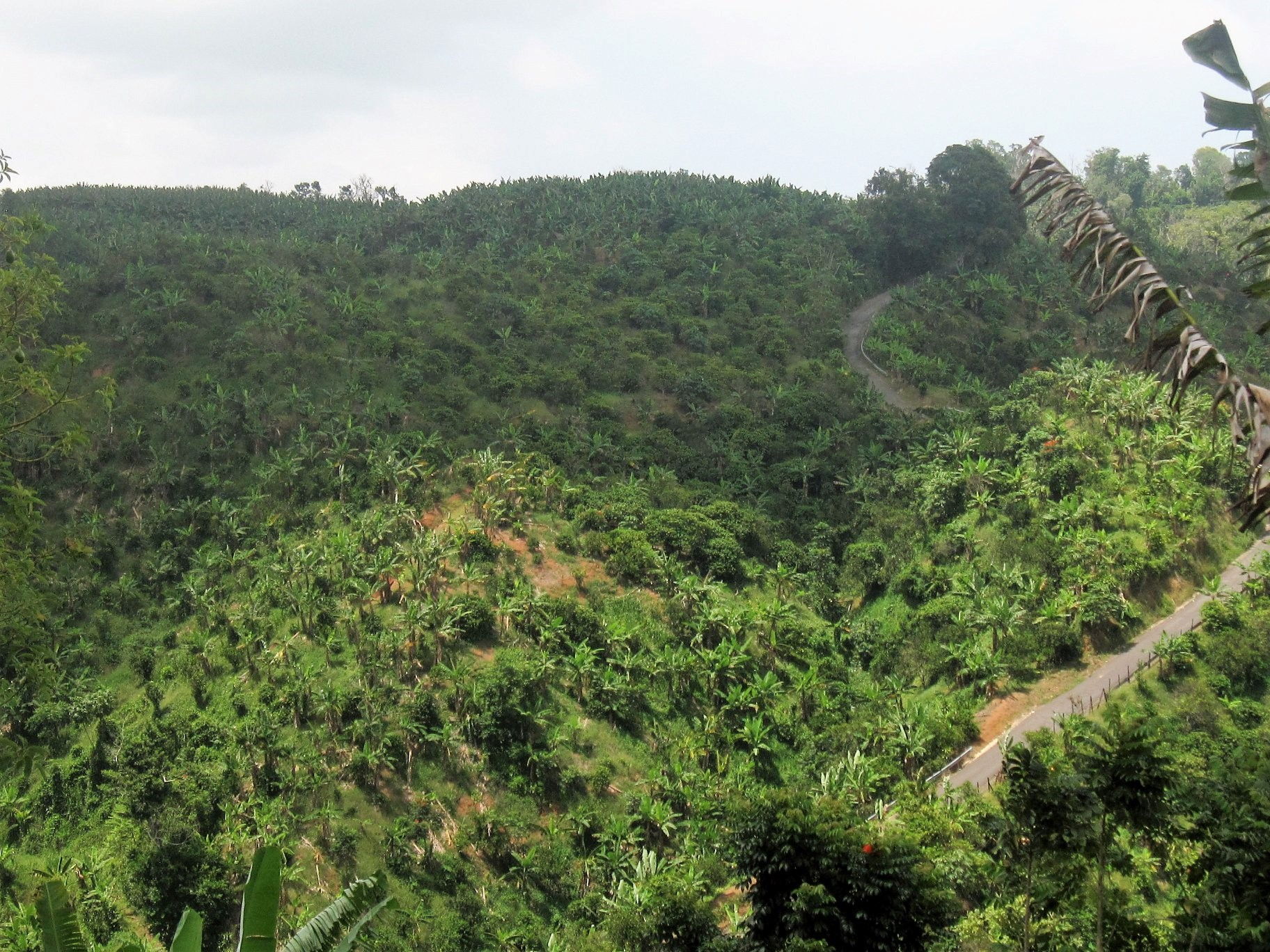
Cuesta de Magos seen from Calabazas barrio

== Major intersections ==
The entire route is located in San Sebastián.

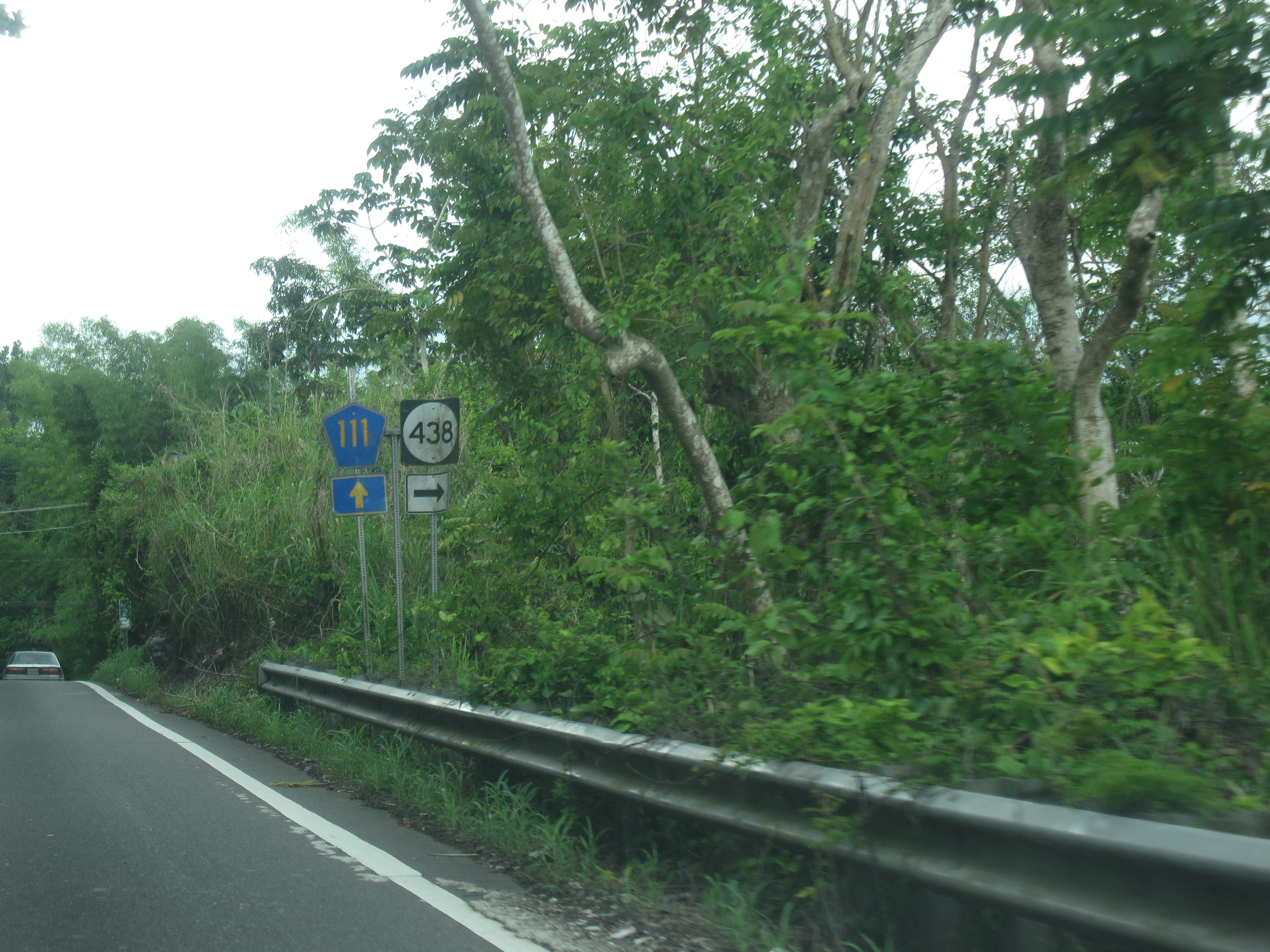
PR-111 east at the western terminus of PR-438

Location	km	mi	Destinations	Notes
Eneas–Cidral– Magos tripoint	0.0	0.0	PR-111 (Carretera Enrique Laguerre) – San Sebastián, Lares	Western terminus of PR-438
Juncal	1.7	1.1	Eastern terminus of PR-438	
1.000 mi = 1.609 km; 1.000 km = 0.621 mi
