= Culebrinas River =

River in Puerto Rico

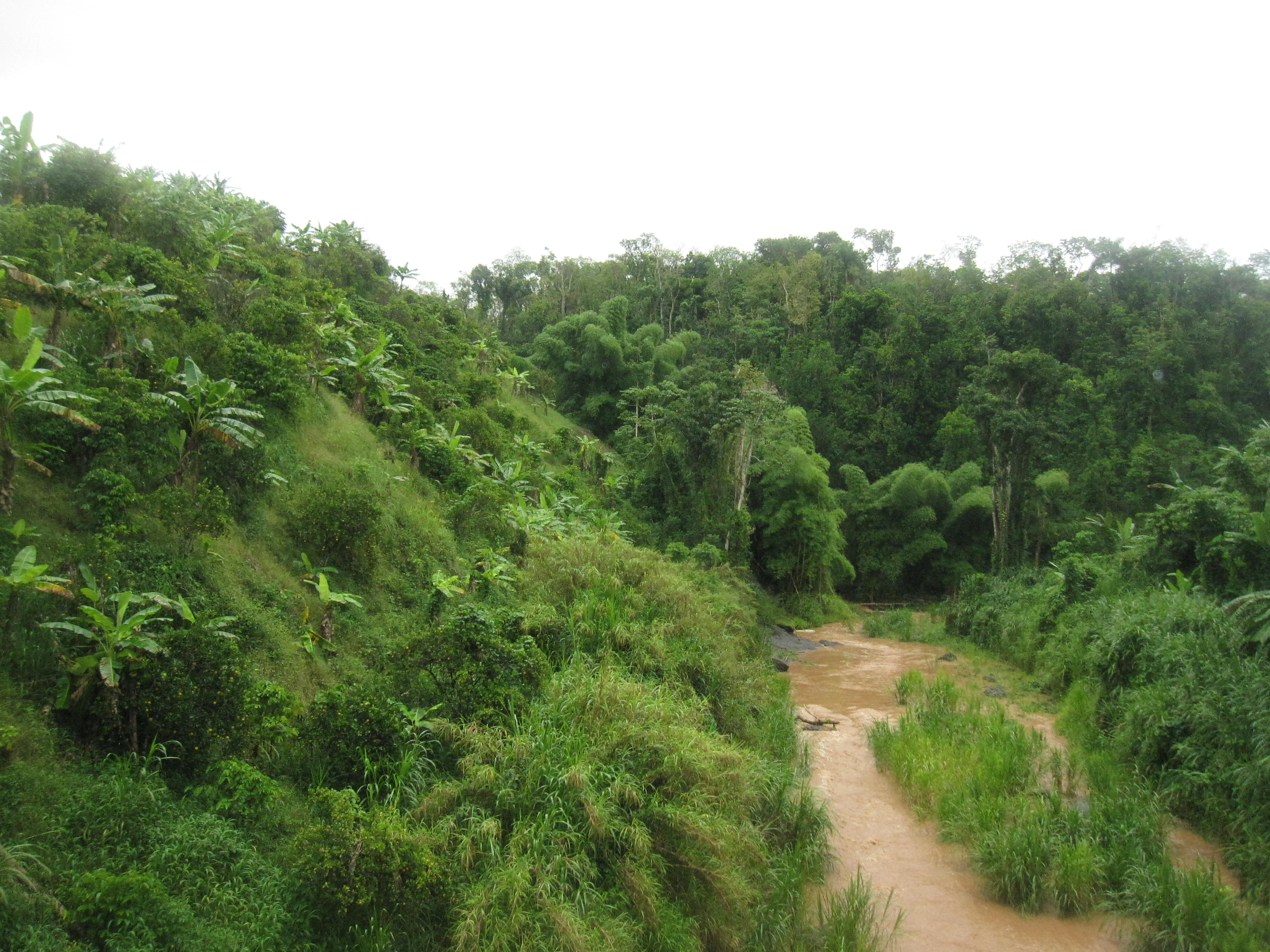
- River as seen from bridge between Magos barrio and Culebrinas barrio

- Location of mouth
- Native name: Río Culebrinas (Spanish)

Location
- Commonwealth: Puerto Rico
- Municipality: Lares, San Sebastián, Moca, Aguada and Aguadilla

Physical characteristics
- Source
  - coordinates: 18°16′21″N 66°53′39″W
- Mouth: Mona Passage
  - coordinates: 18°24′21″N 67°10′37″W
  - elevation: 0 ft (0 m)
- Length: 25 mi (40 km)
- Basin size: 105 sq mi (270 km^{2})

The Culebrinas River (Spanish: Río Culebrinas, pronounced [ˈri.o kuleˈβɾinas] KOOL-ə-BREEN-əs) is a river in northwestern Puerto Rico. It originates in southwestern Lares for 25 miles (40 km) till it empties into the Mona Passage south of downtown Aguadilla. It goes through Lares, San Sebastián, Moca, Aguada and Aguadilla municipalities. It is 37.33 miles long and when it floods causes damage to infrastructure in a number of municipalities.

== Variant names and meaning ==
Culebrina is Spanish for "forked lightning". In maps the river name has been spelled different ways:

- Río Culebrinas
- River Culebrinas
- Rio de Colovrinas

== History ==
Christopher Columbus is said to have anchored and come ashore near the mouth of the Culebrinas River in 1493. A stone cross monument was erected to mark the site, but it was destroyed by the 1918 San Fermín earthquake.

In the 1898 Military Notes on Puerto Rico by the U.S. it is written that Culebrina River "is bounded on the south and east by the Lares Mountain ridge, and on the north by small hills of little interest. From the Lares Mountains it flows from east to west and empties on the west coast north of San Francisco de la Aguada, in the center of the bay formed between Point Peñas Blancas and Point San Francisco."

=== Flooding ===
In 2007, Tropical Storm Olga caused flooding on the river, forcing an evacuation.

In late May, 2019 multiple areas in various municipalities suffered flooding, felled trees, landslides and closed highways when Río Culebrinas flooded. In San Sebastián, a road caved in. There is a bridge on PR-438 that goes over the Culebrinas River in barrio Magos and when the river floods the road is closed.

In mid 2018, the U.S. Army Corps of Engineers announced its list of projects for Puerto Rico. $400,000 was earmarked to study how to reduce damage caused by a flooding Río Culebrinas.

== Watershed protection program ==
In June 2018, a large project, by the Natural Resources Conservation Service (NRCS) and the Puerto Rico Department of Natural and Environmental Resources (PRDNER), to clear debris from Culebrinas River in Moca was deemed a success.

== Gallery ==
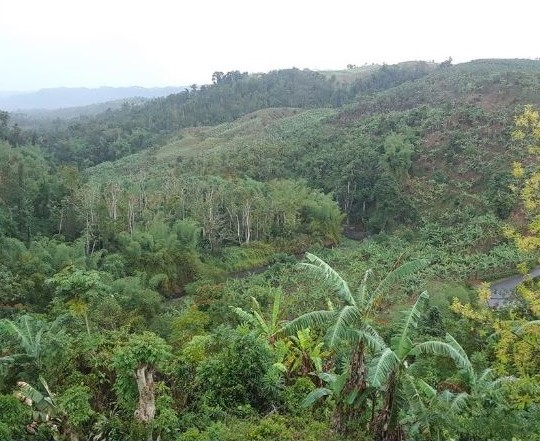
Culebrinas River in the center, before heavy rains; seen from Calabazas

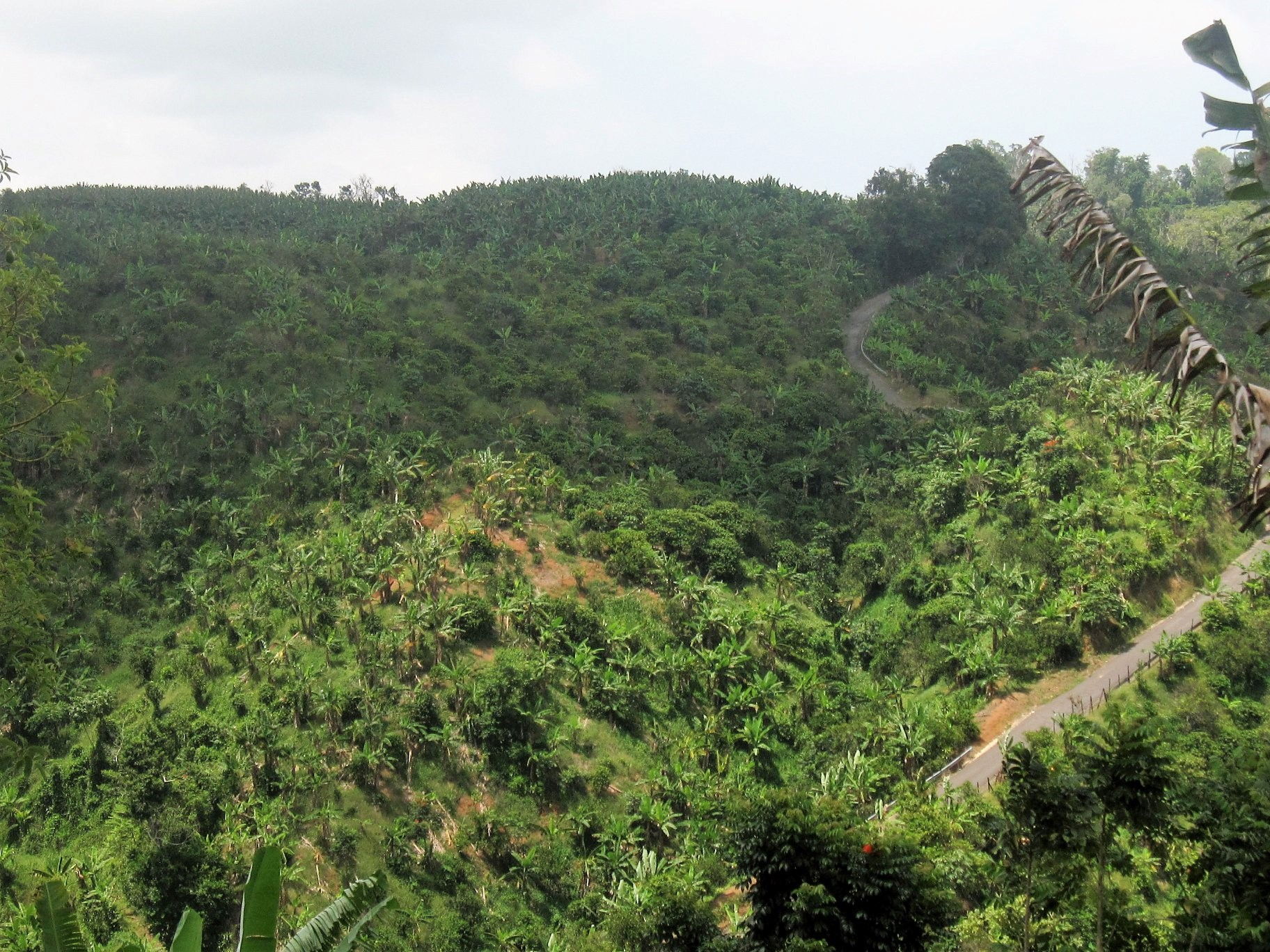
Cuesta de Magos as seen from barrio Calabazas, San Sebastián

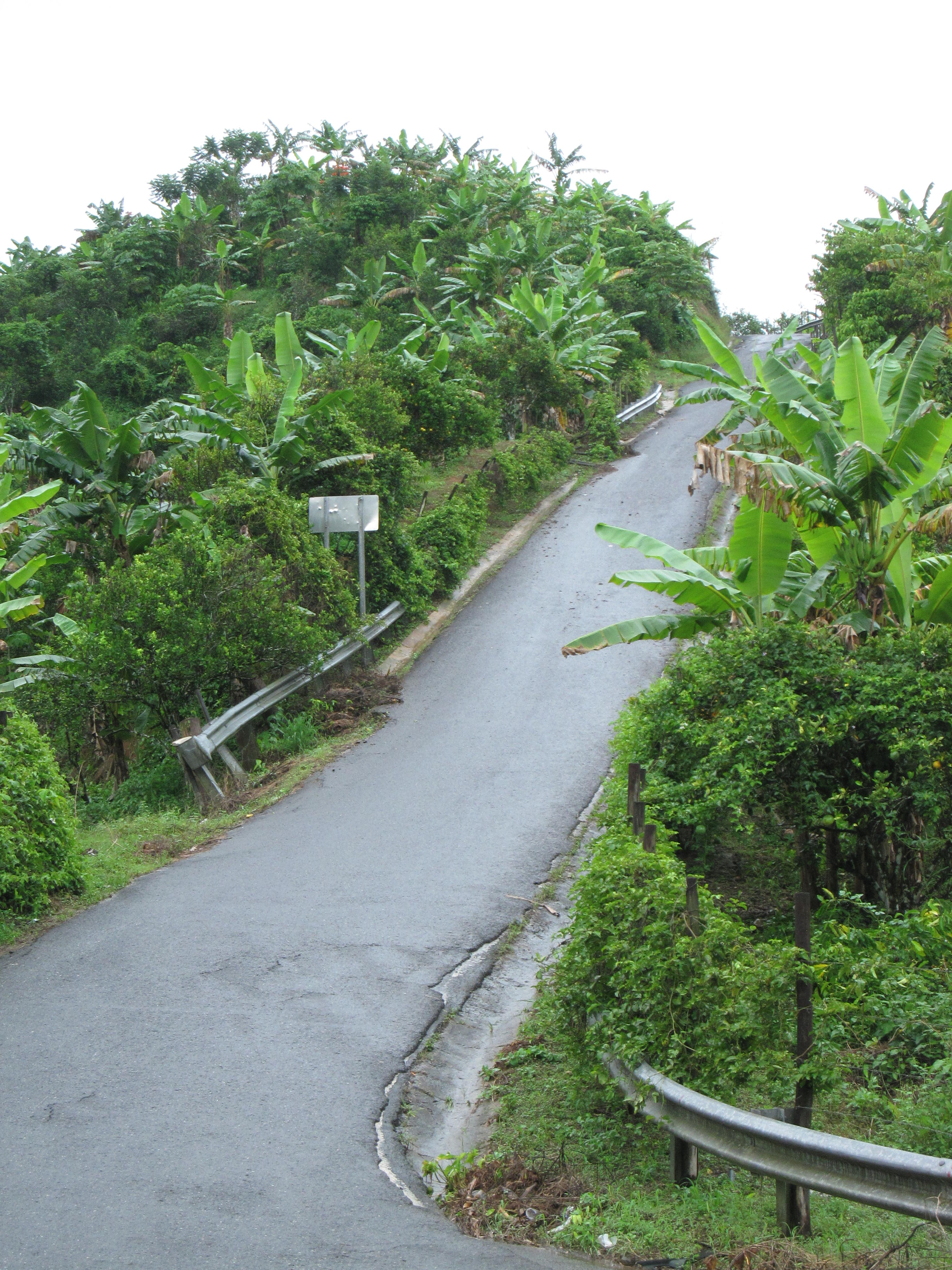
At bottom of Cuesta de Magos near Río Culebrinas

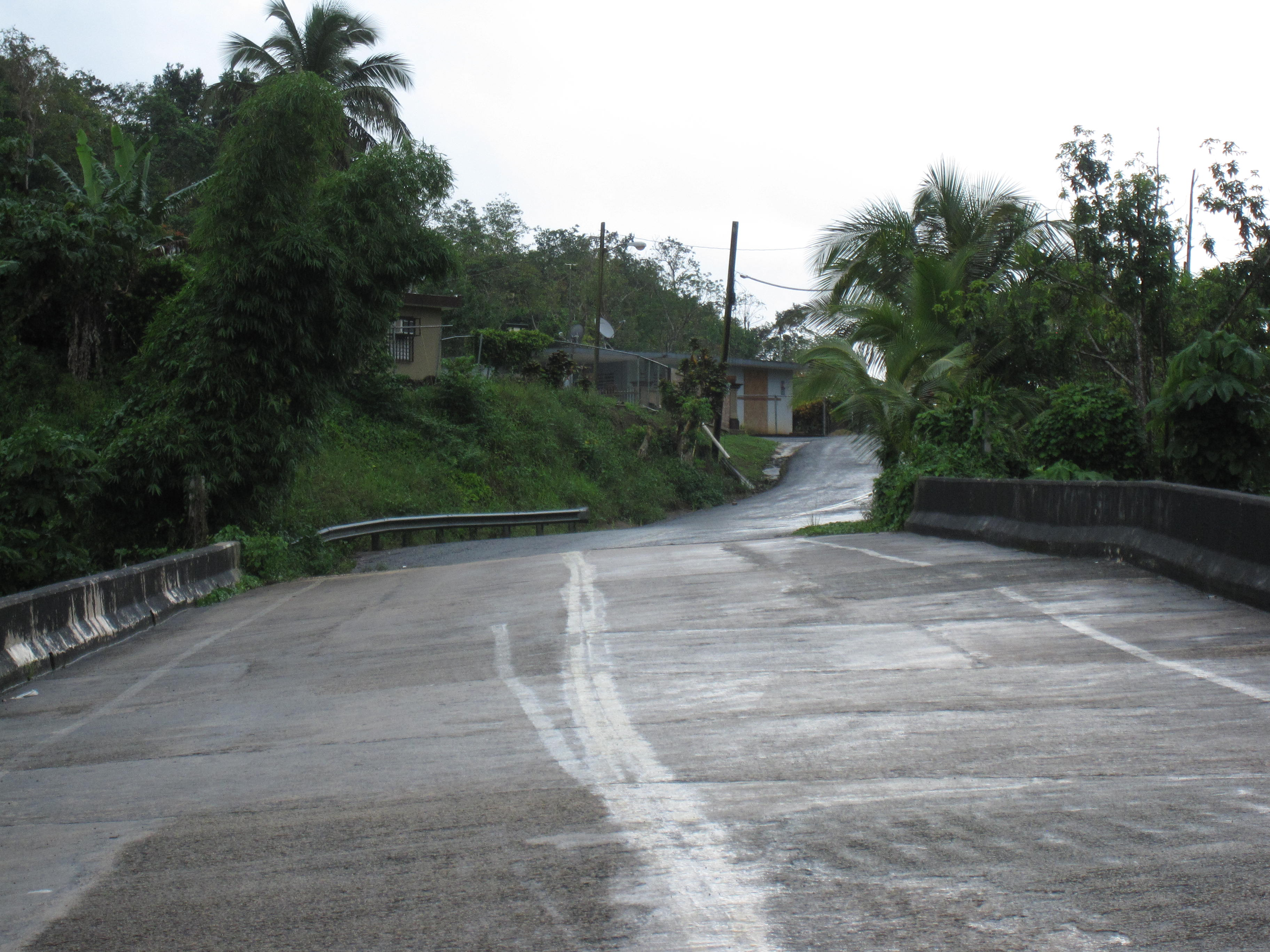
Slanted bridge at bottom of hill, on PR-438 over Río Culebrinas in barrio Magos

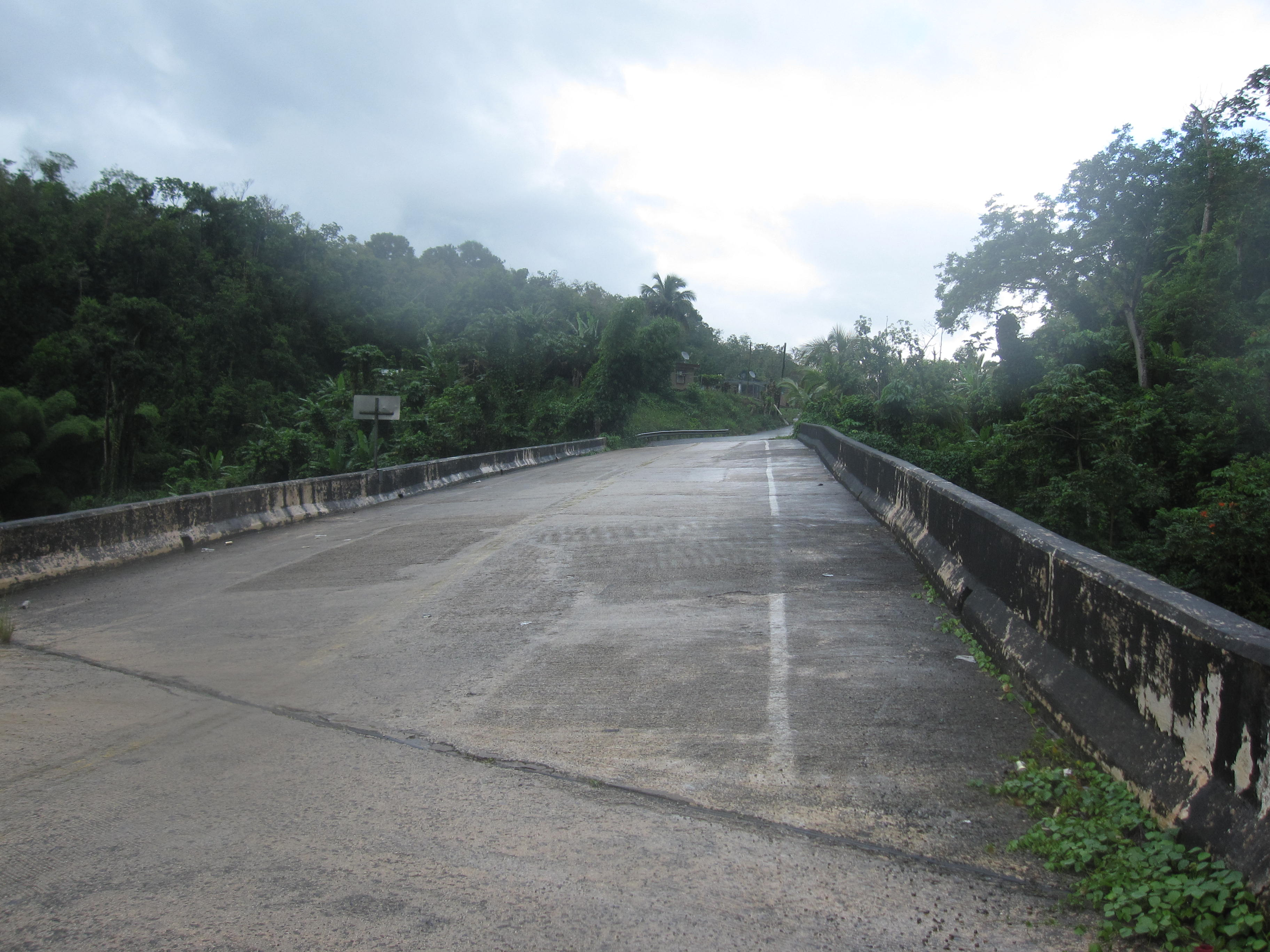
Slanted bridge over Río Culebrinas between Magos barrio and Calabazas barrio

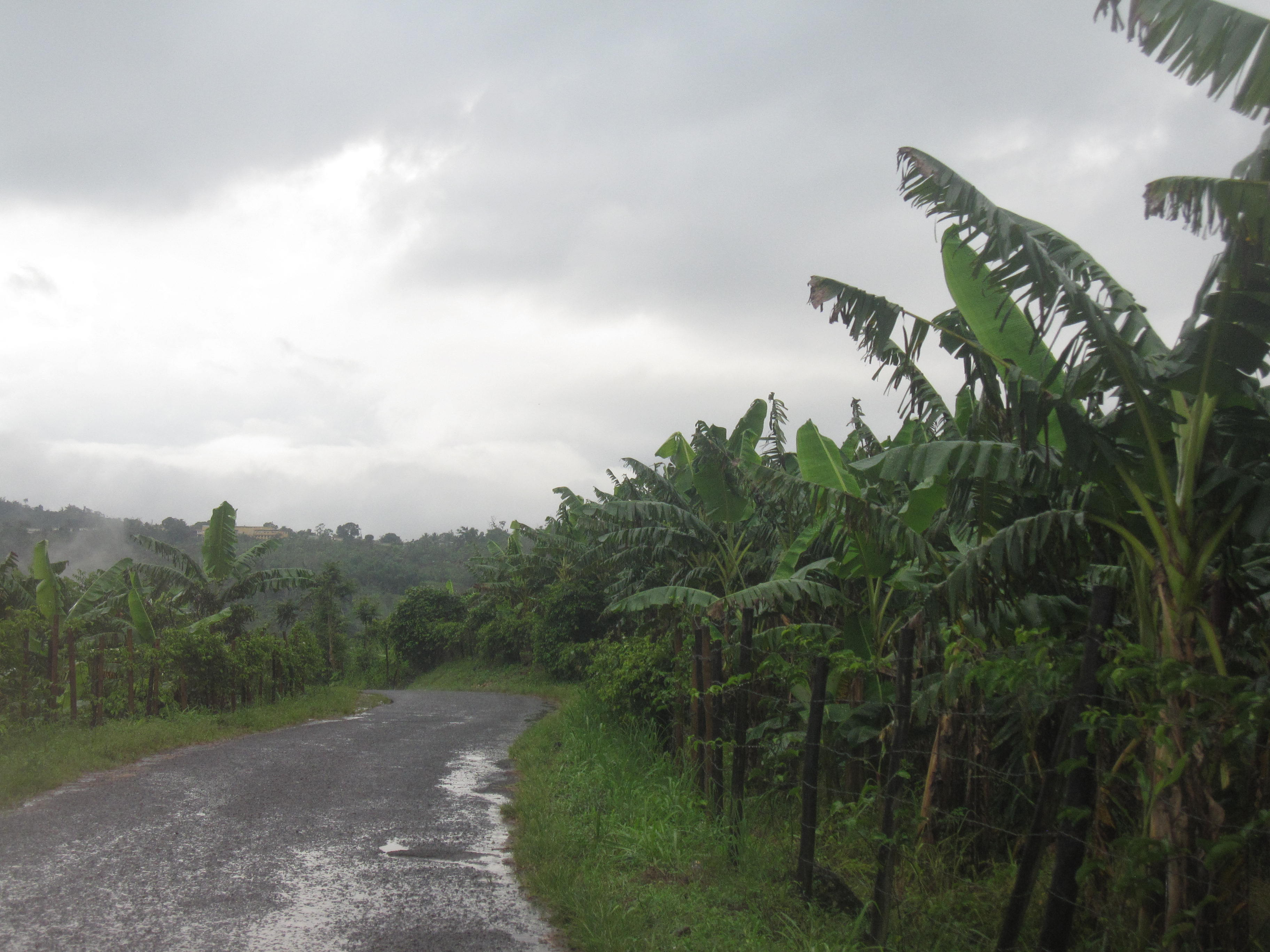
Cuesta de Magos in barrio Magos, PR-438 heading to Río Culebrinas

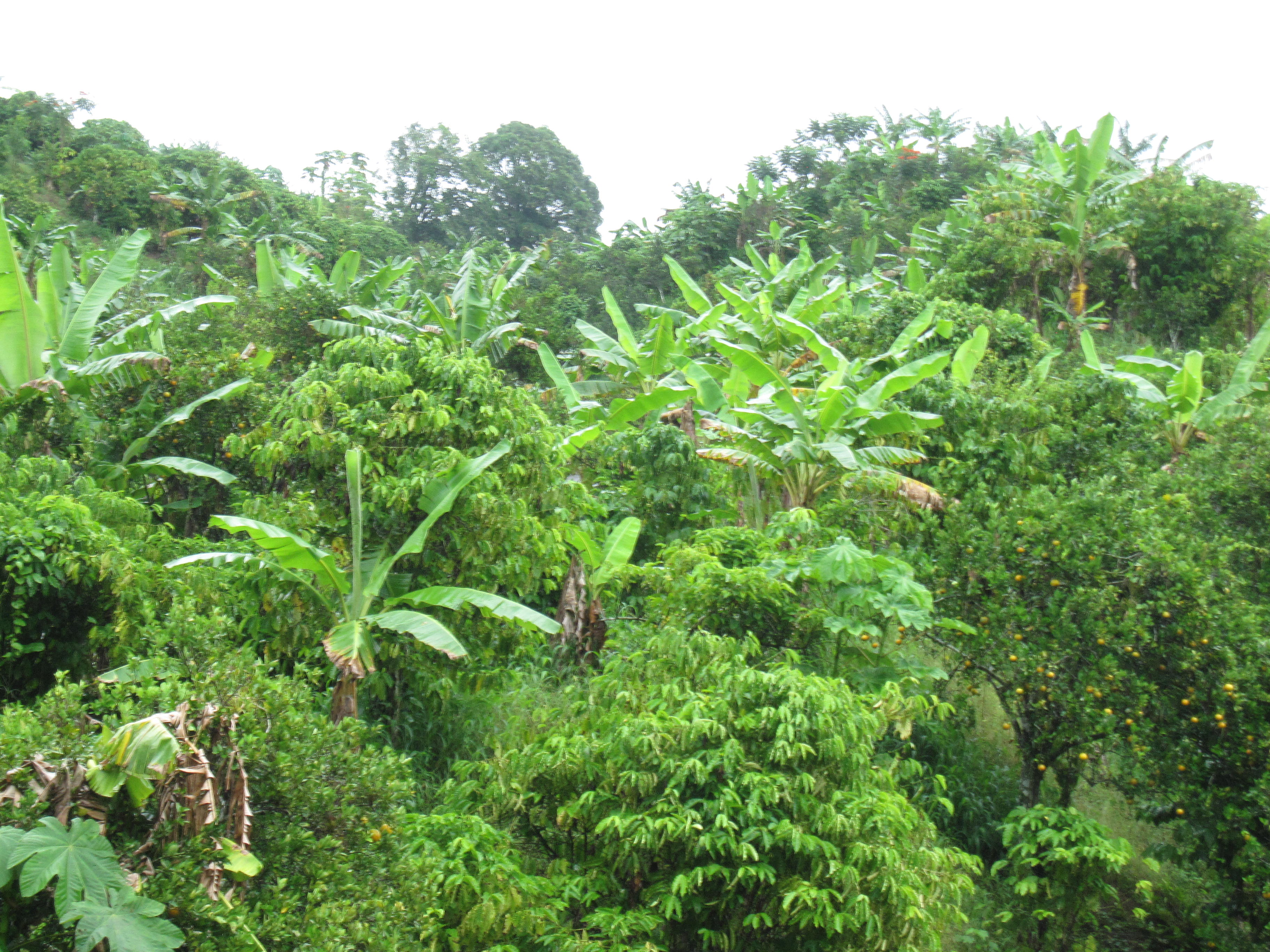
Vegetation and fruit trees at bottom of "Magos Hill"

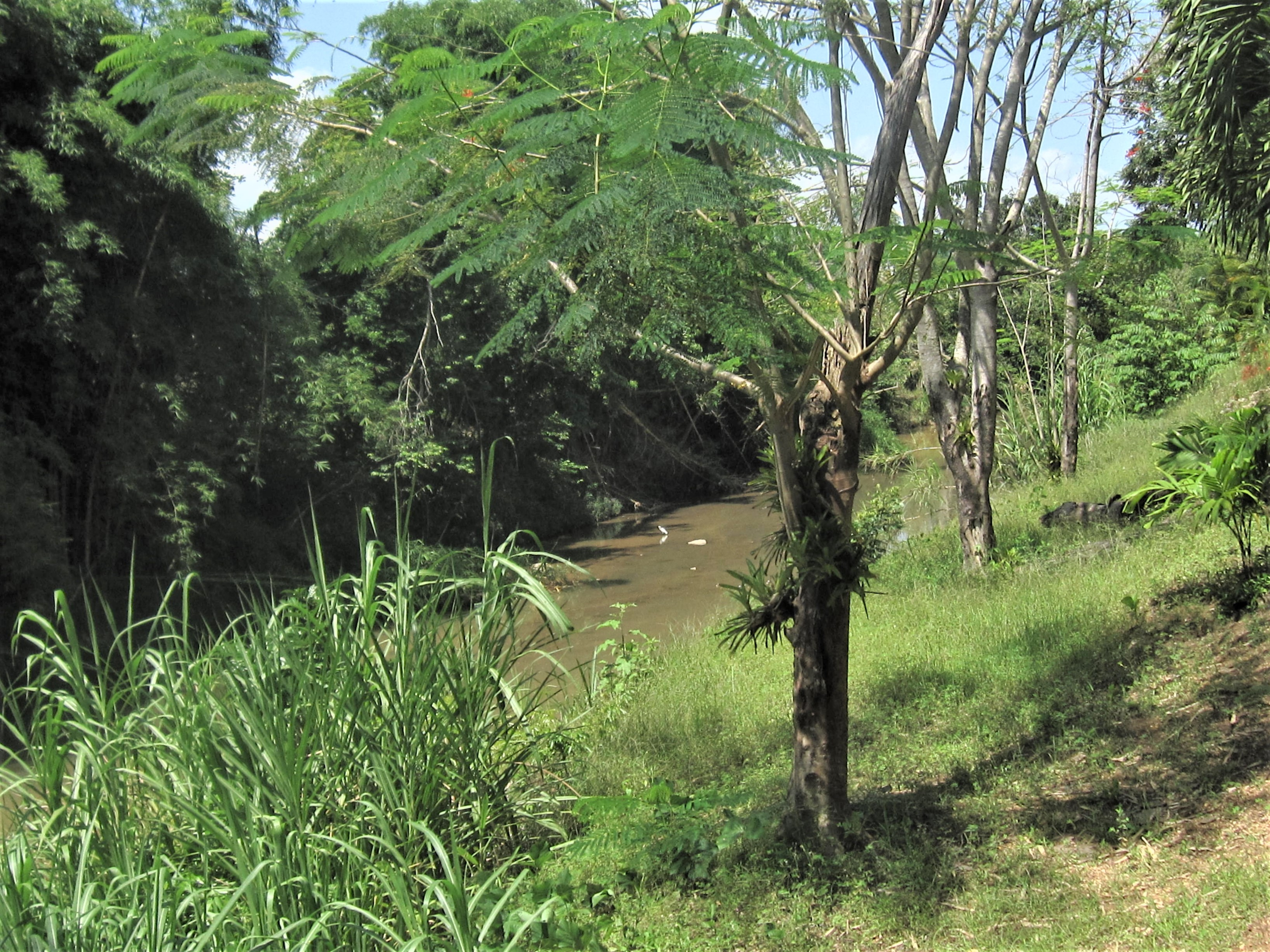
Río Culebrinas from bridge on PR-119 near downtown San Sebastián

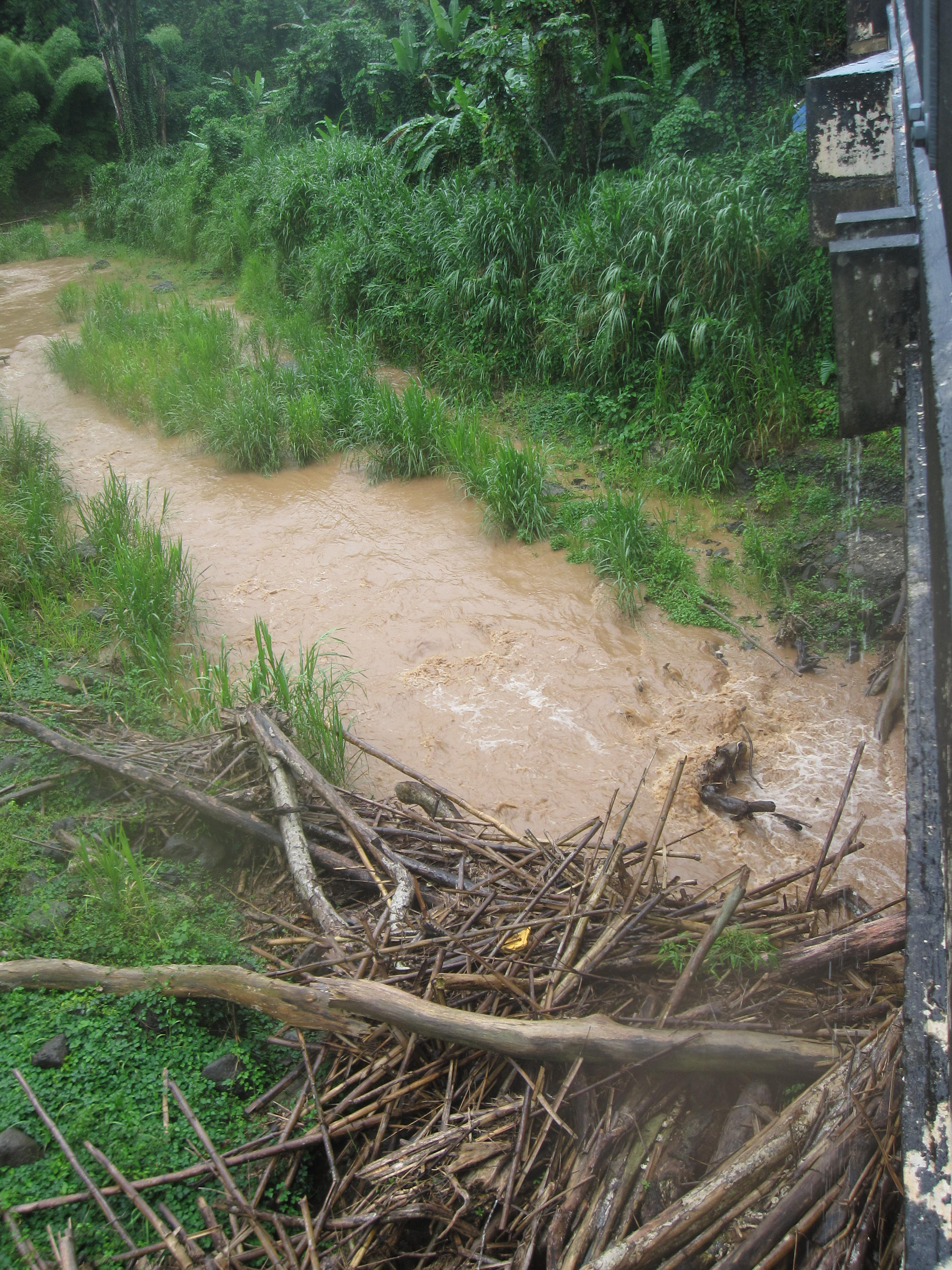
Río Culebrinas collecting debris at bottom of slanted bridge between Magos barrio and Calabazas barrio

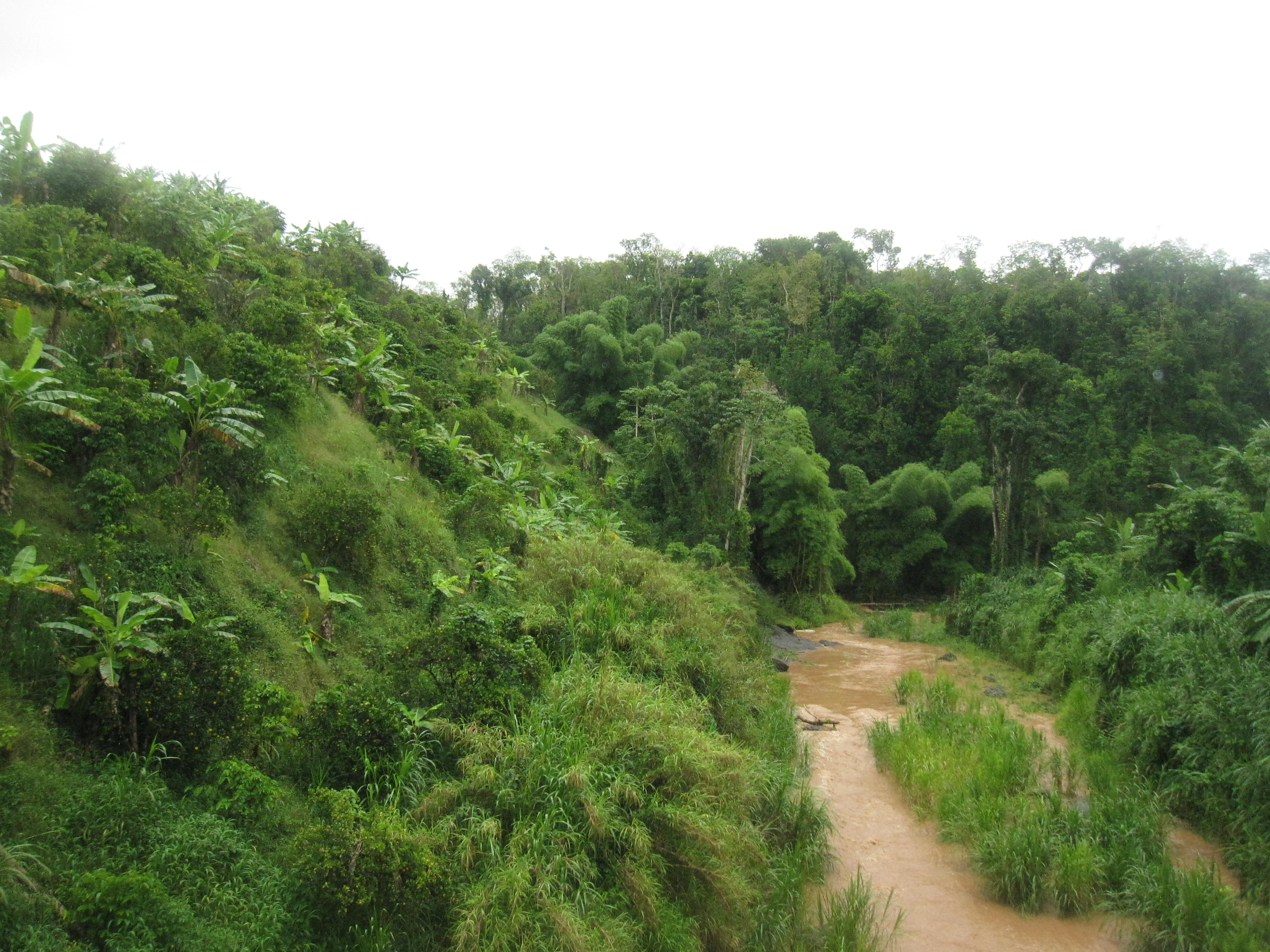
Río Culebrinas as seen from slanted bridge between Magos barrio and Calabazas barrio on a normal day

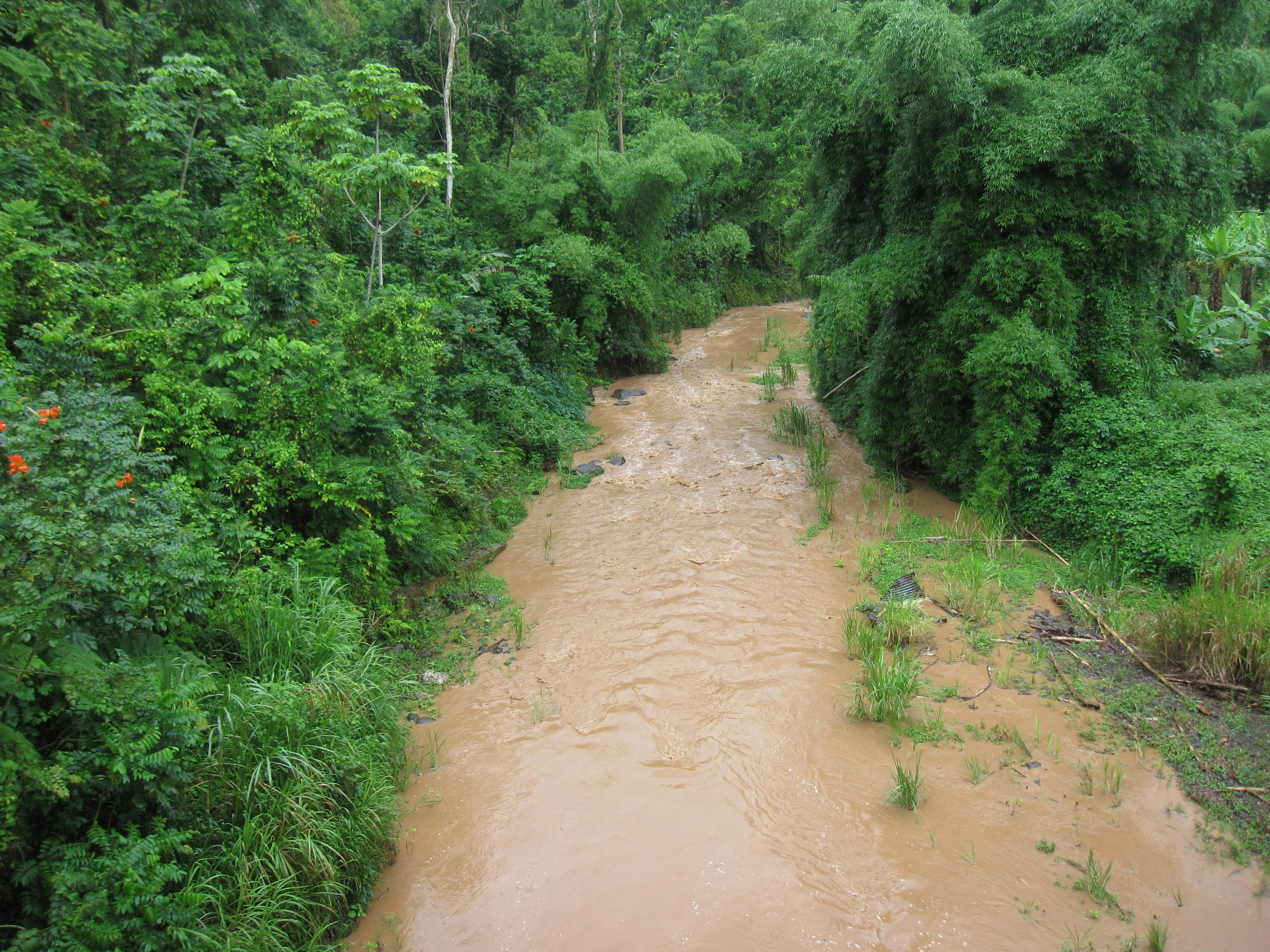
Río Culebrinas from bridge between Magos barrio and Calabazas barrio

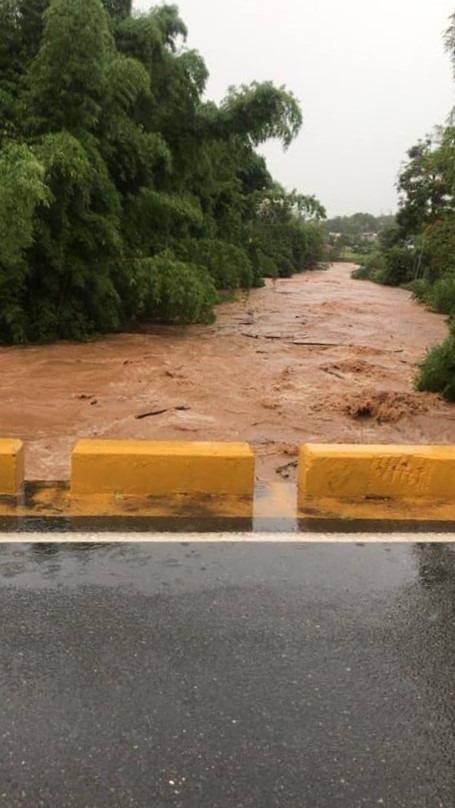
Río Culebrinas from bridge between Magos barrio and Calabazas barrio after heavy rains

== See also ==
- Puente de Coloso: NRHP listing in Aguada, Puerto Rico
- List of rivers of Puerto Rico
