= Magos, San Sebastián, Puerto Rico =

Barrio of Puerto Rico

Magos
- Barrio
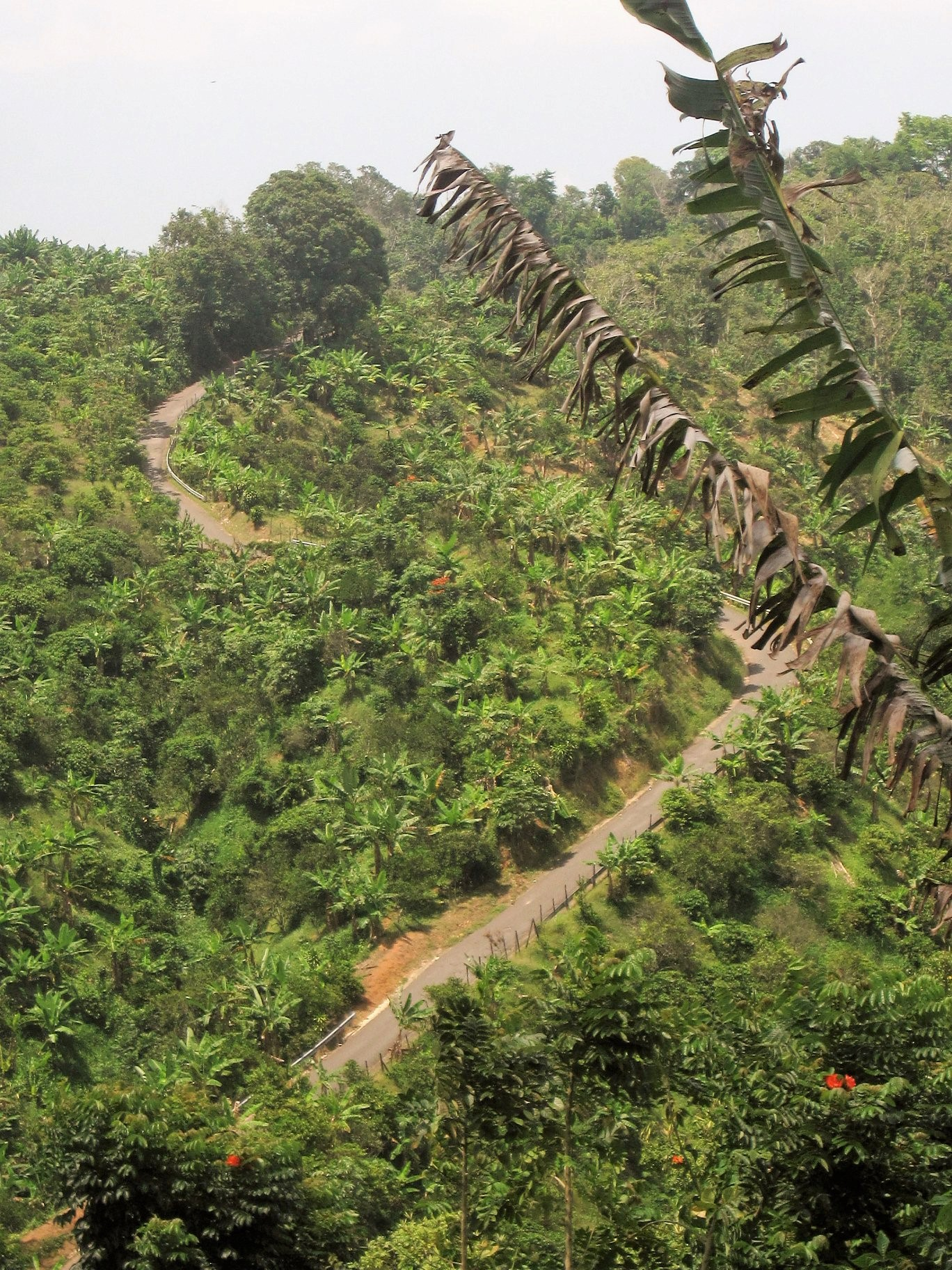
- Cuesta de Magos is a long, steep, narrow, curvy section of PR-438 that leads down to Río Culebrinas in Magos.

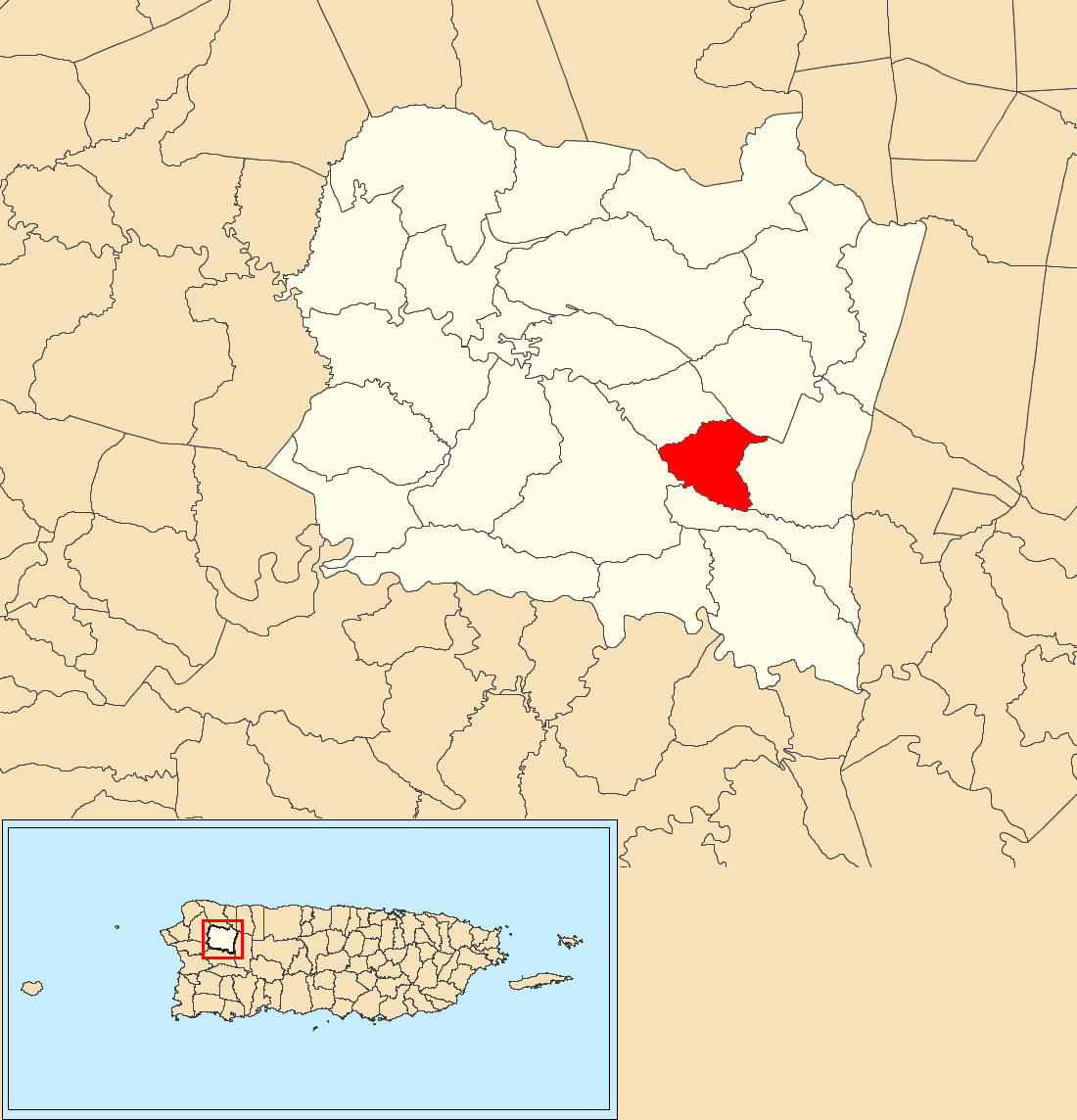
- Location of Magos within the municipality of San Sebastián shown in red

- Location of Puerto Rico
- Coordinates: 18°18′30″N 66°56′37″W
- Commonwealth: Puerto Rico
- Municipality: San Sebastián

Area
  - Total: 1.42 sq mi (3.7 km^{2})
  - Land: 1.42 sq mi (3.7 km^{2})
  - Water: 0 sq mi (0 km^{2})
- Elevation: 804 ft (245 m)

Population (2010)
  - Total: 232
  - Density: 163.4/sq mi (63.1/km^{2})
- Source: 2010 Census
- Time zone: UTC−4 (AST)

Magos is a barrio in the municipality of San Sebastián, Puerto Rico. Its population in 2010 was 232.

== History ==
Magos was in Spain's gazetteers until Puerto Rico was ceded by Spain in the aftermath of the Spanish–American War under the terms of the Treaty of Paris of 1898 and became an unincorporated territory of the United States. In 1899, the United States Department of War conducted a census of Puerto Rico finding that the combined population of Magos and Eneas barrios was 1,003.

Historical population
Census	Pop.	Note	%±
1910	425		—
1920	435		2.4%
1930	500		14.9%
1940	482		−3.6%
1950	494		2.5%
1960	382		−22.7%
1970	248		−35.1%
1980	215		−13.3%
1990	261		21.4%
2000	242		−7.3%
2010	232		−4.1%
U.S. Decennial Census; 1900 (N/A) 1910-1930; 1930-1950 1980-2000 2010

== Sectors ==
Barrios (which are, in contemporary times, roughly comparable to minor civil divisions) in turn are further subdivided into smaller local populated place areas/units called sectores (sectors in English). The types of sectores may vary, from normally sector to urbanización to reparto to barriada to residencial, among others.

The following sectors are in Magos barrio:

Carretera 438, Carretera 451, Carretera 470, Sector Ballester, Sector La Cuadra, Sector Melito Oliva, Sector Miguel A. Pérez, Sector Puente Lajas, Sector Pujols, Sector Sonoco, Sector Toño Jiménez, and Urbanización Santa Teresita.

== Río Culebrinas ==
There is a bridge on PR-438 that goes over the Culebrinas River in Magos and when the river floods the road is closed to traffic.

== Gallery ==
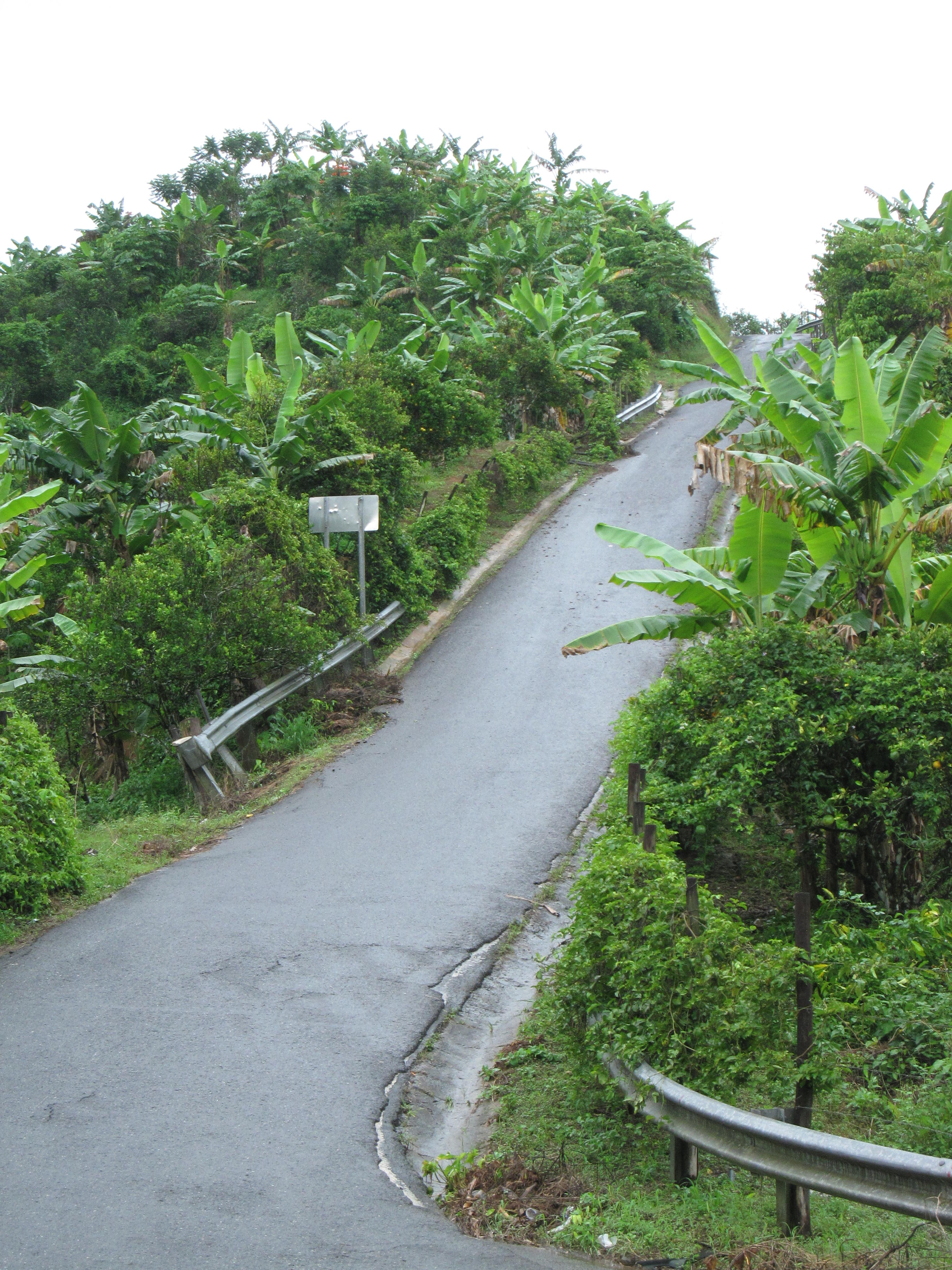
At bottom of Cuesta de Magos near Río Culebrinas

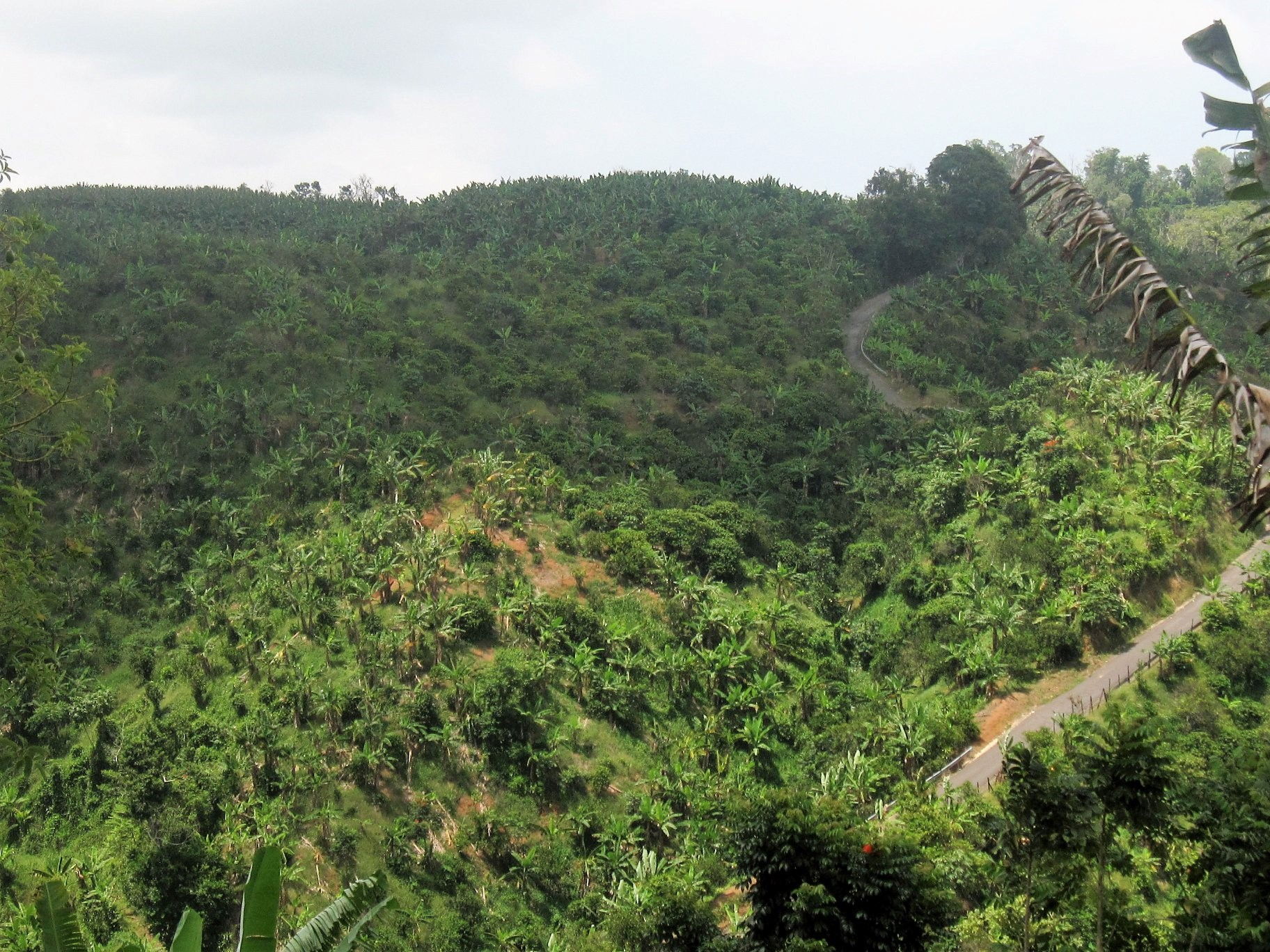
Cuesta de Magos as seen from barrio Calabazas, San Sebastián

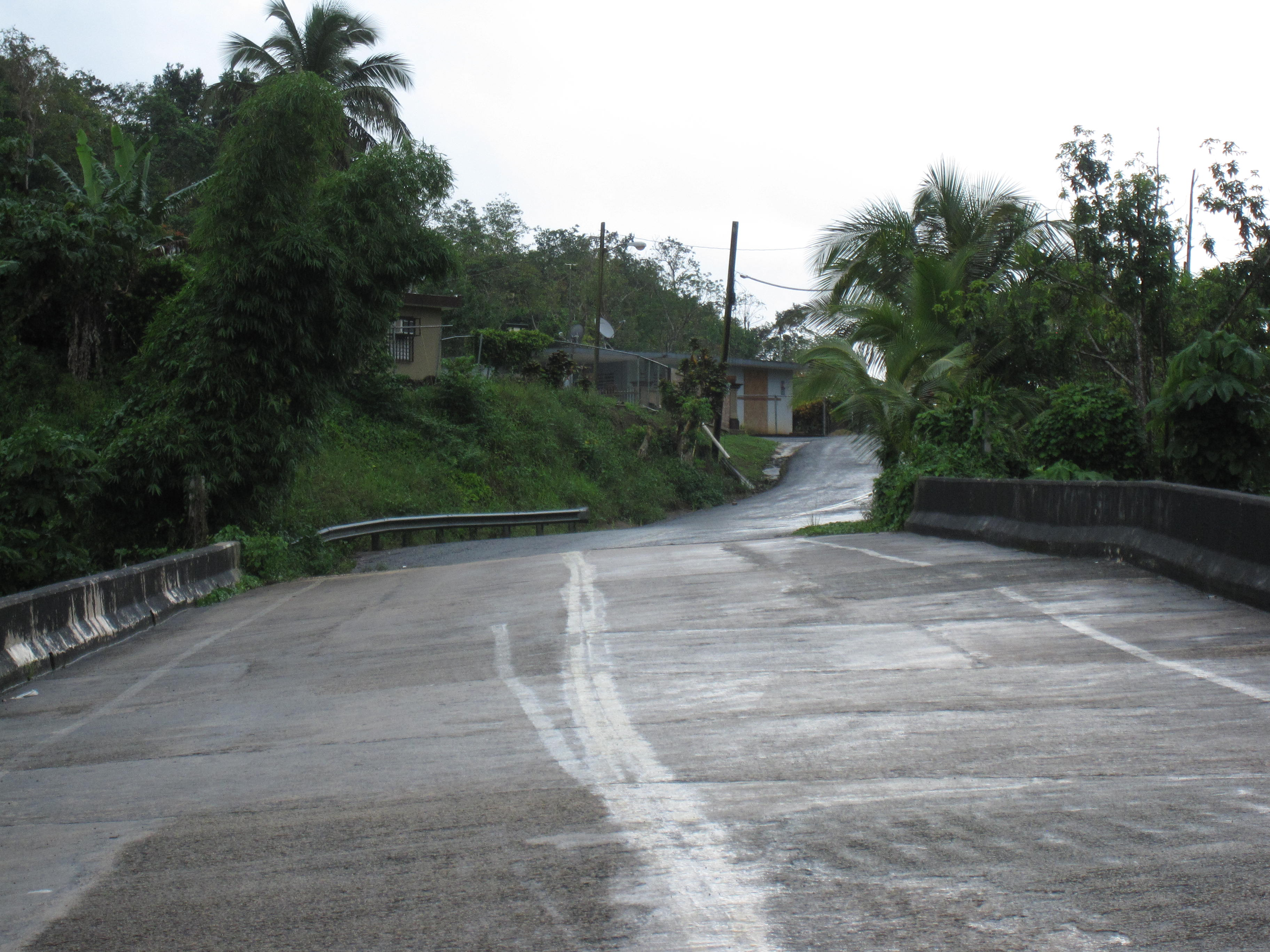
Slanted bridge at bottom of hill, on PR-438 over Río Culebrinas in barrio Magos

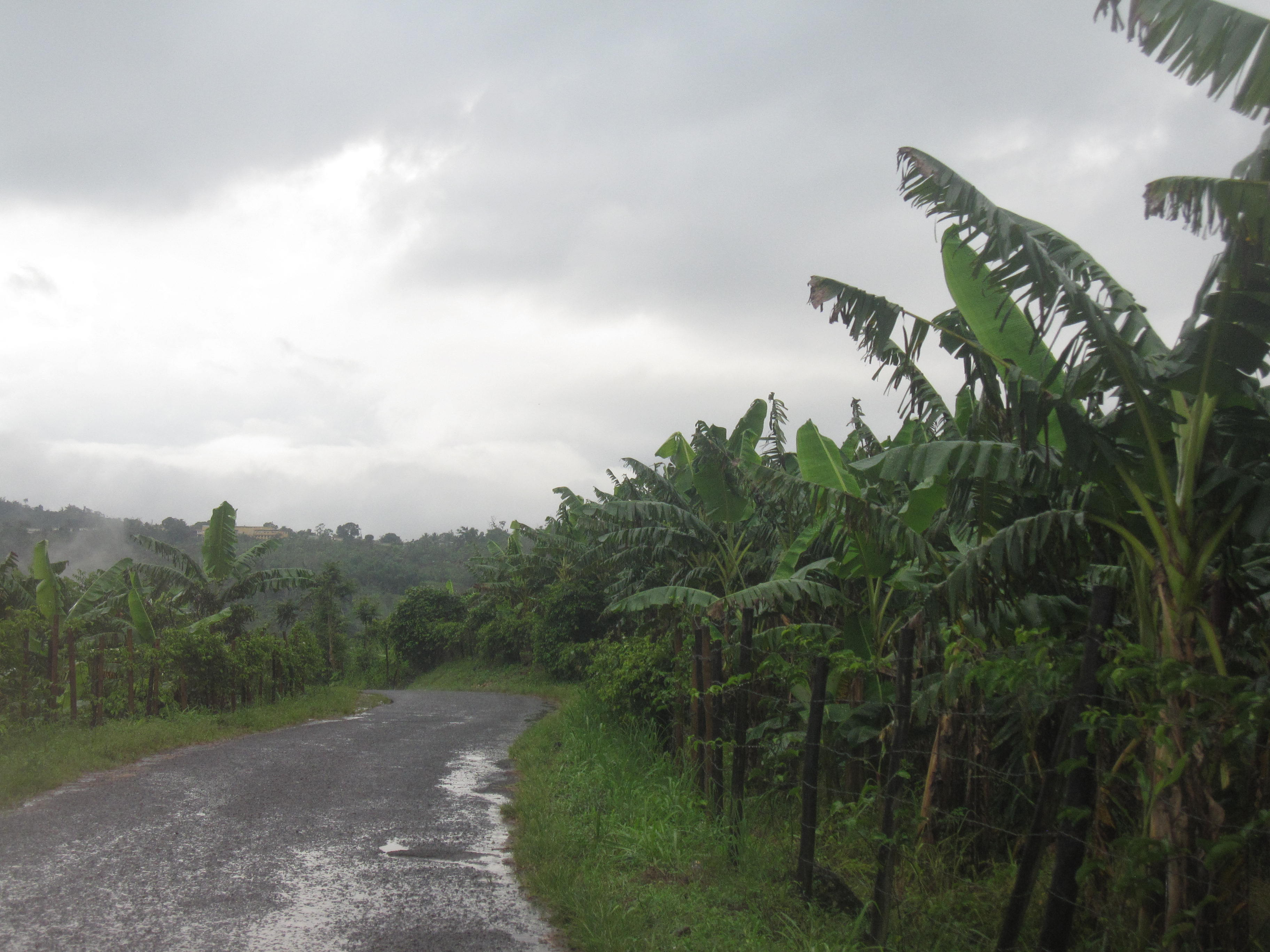
Cuesta de Magos in barrio Magos, PR-438

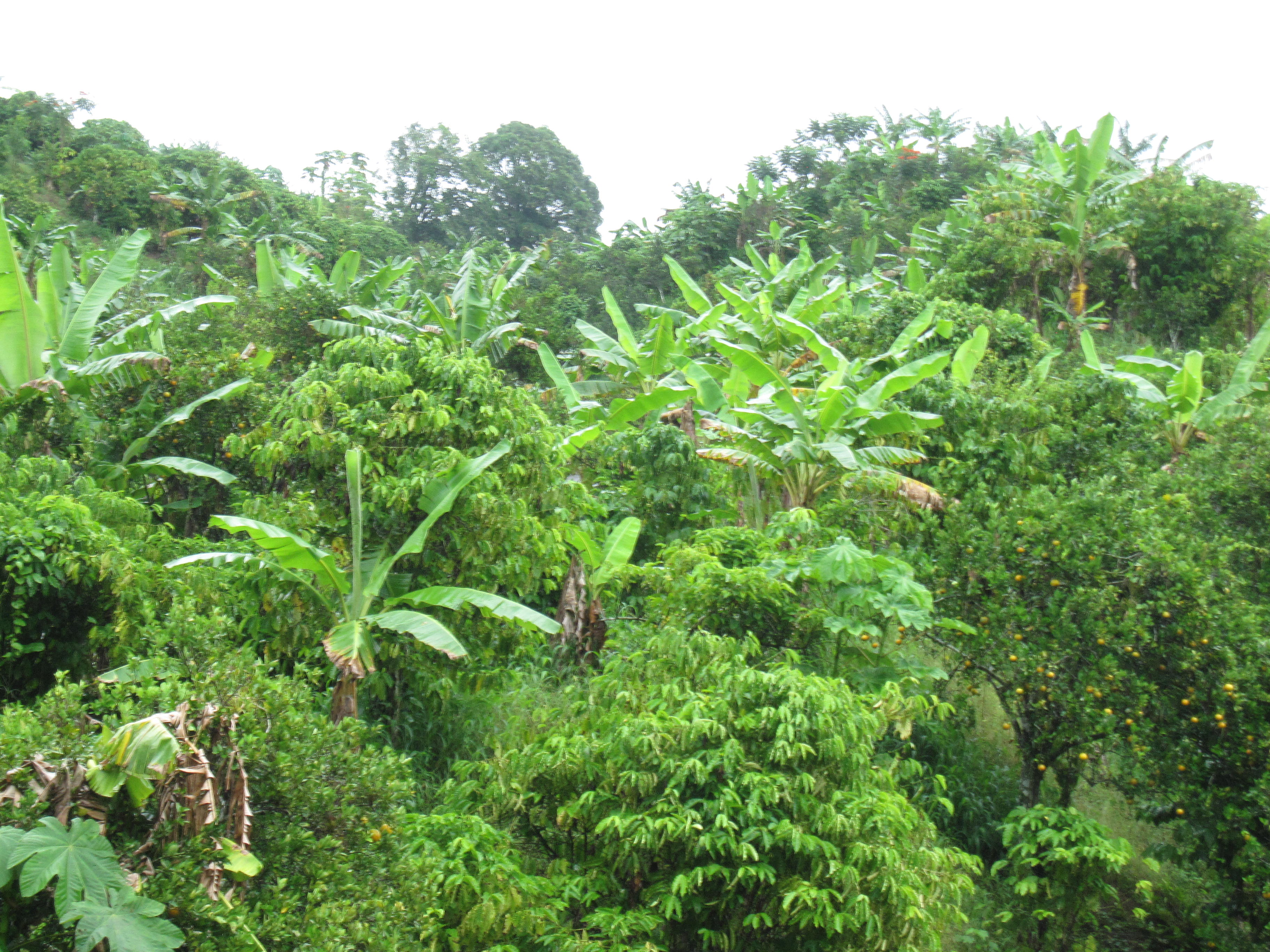
Vegetation and fruit trees at bottom of "Magos Hill"

== See also ==
- List of communities in Puerto Rico
- List of barrios and sectors of San Sebastián, Puerto Rico
