= Calabazas, San Sebastián, Puerto Rico =

Barrio of Puerto Rico

Calabazas
- Barrio
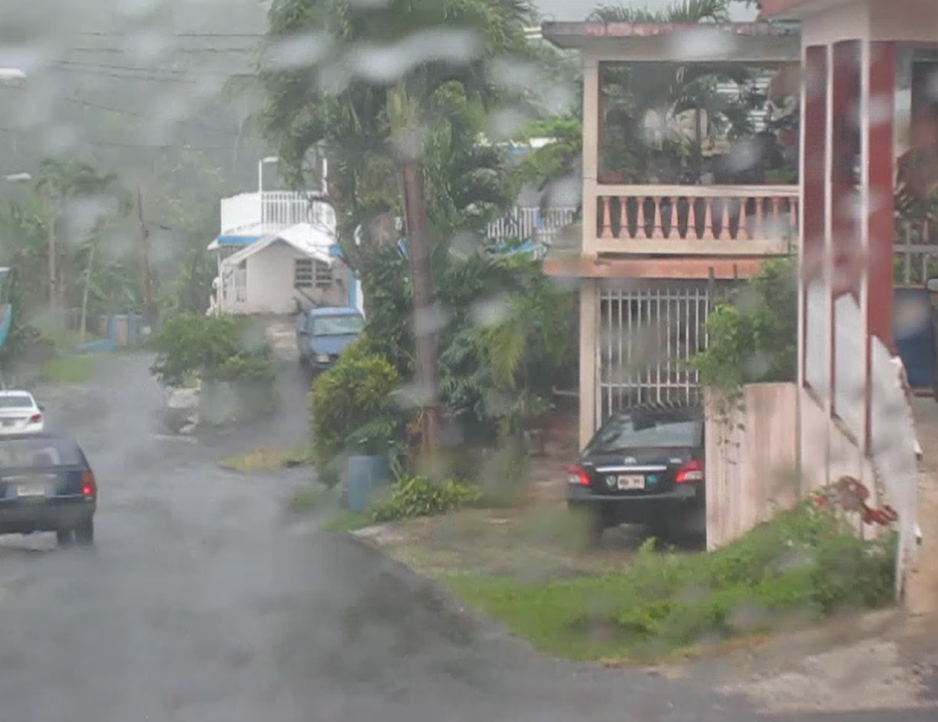
- Street and homes in Calabazas

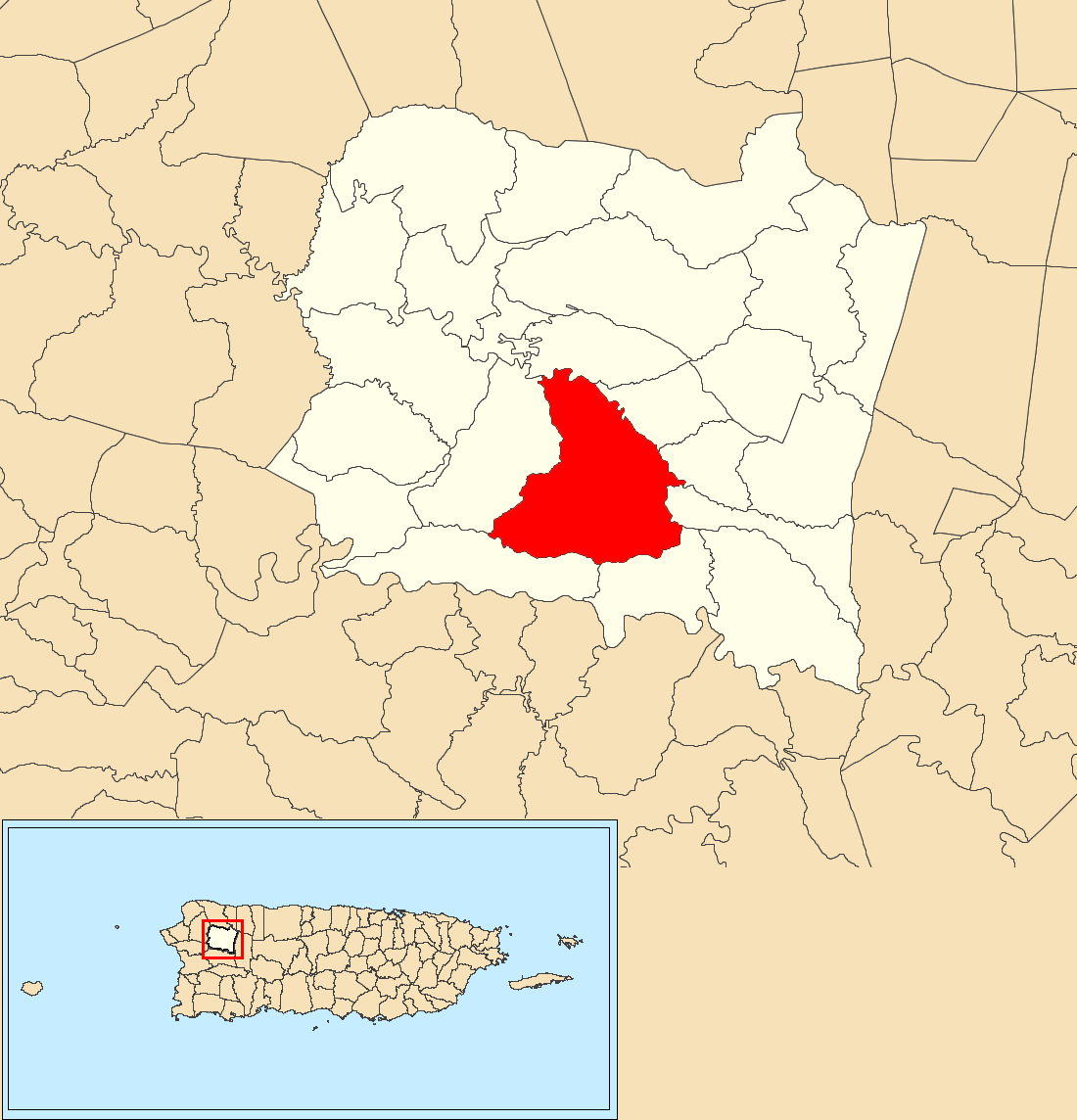
- Location of Calabazas within the municipality of San Sebastián shown in red

- Location of Puerto Rico
- Coordinates: 18°18′07″N 66°58′38″W
- Commonwealth: Puerto Rico
- Municipality: San Sebastián

Area
  - Total: 5.69 sq mi (14.7 km^{2})
  - Land: 5.69 sq mi (14.7 km^{2})
  - Water: 0 sq mi (0 km^{2})
- Elevation: 643 ft (196 m)

Population (2010)
  - Total: 2,768
  - Density: 486.5/sq mi (187.8/km^{2})
- Source: 2010 Census
- Time zone: UTC−4 (AST)

Calabazas is a barrio in the municipality of San Sebastián, Puerto Rico. Its population in 2010 was 2,768.

== History ==
Calabazas was in Spain's gazetteers until Puerto Rico was ceded by Spain in the aftermath of the Spanish–American War under the terms of the Treaty of Paris of 1898 and became an unincorporated territory of the United States. In 1899, the United States Department of War conducted a census of Puerto Rico finding that the population of Calabazas barrio was 746.

The road to the Calabazas bridge, which is over Culebrinas River suffered heavy damages with Hurricane Maria on September 20, 2017, and debris was piled up in and around the bridge.

One of the 16 deaths in Puerto Rico attributed to the 2022 category 4 Hurricane Fiona happened in Calabazas.

Pepino Memorial Park, a cemetery is located in Calabazas.

== Sectors ==
Barrios (which are, in contemporary times, roughly comparable to minor civil divisions) in turn are further subdivided into smaller local populated place areas/units called sectores (sectors in English). The types of sectores may vary, from normally sector to urbanización to reparto to barriada to residencial, among others.

The following sectors are in Calabazas barrio:

Carretera 111, Carretera 4435, Residencial Jardines de Piedras Blancas, Sector Audeliz Torres, Sector Bartolo Cordero, Sector Cataño, Sector El Refugio, Sector Jandino Ruiz, Sector La Loma, Sector Los Tanques, Sector Lupe Mártir, Sector Mamey, Sector Orta, Sector Pablo Nieves (Los Pinos), Sector Quinto Ríos, Sector Rancho Grande, Sector Rubén Hernández, Sector Toño Mestre, Urbanización Jardines Villy Ana, Urbanización Raholisa, Urbanización Venturini, and Urbanización Villas de Piedras Blancas.

== Demographics ==
Historical population
Census	Pop.	Note	%±
1900	746		—
1910	886		18.8%
1920	1,076		21.4%
1930	1,285		19.4%
1940	1,383		7.6%
1950	1,784		29.0%
1960	1,537		−13.8%
1970	1,396		−9.2%
1980	1,772		26.9%
1990	2,126		20.0%
2000	2,458		15.6%
2010	2,768		12.6%
U.S. Decennial Census; 1899 (shown as 1900) 1910-1930; 1930-1950 1980-2000 2010

== Gallery ==
Scenes in Calabazas

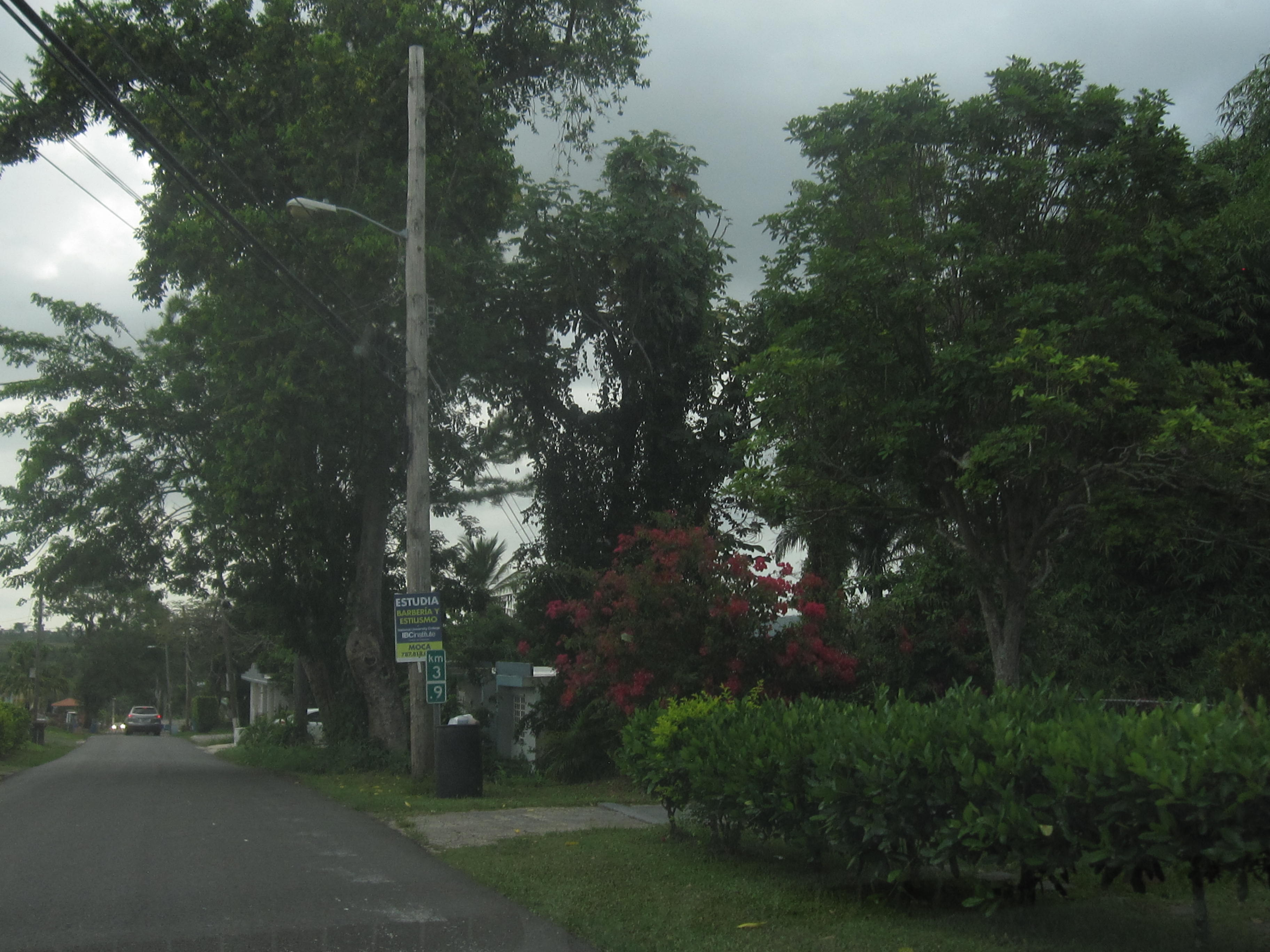
Heading east on PR-435

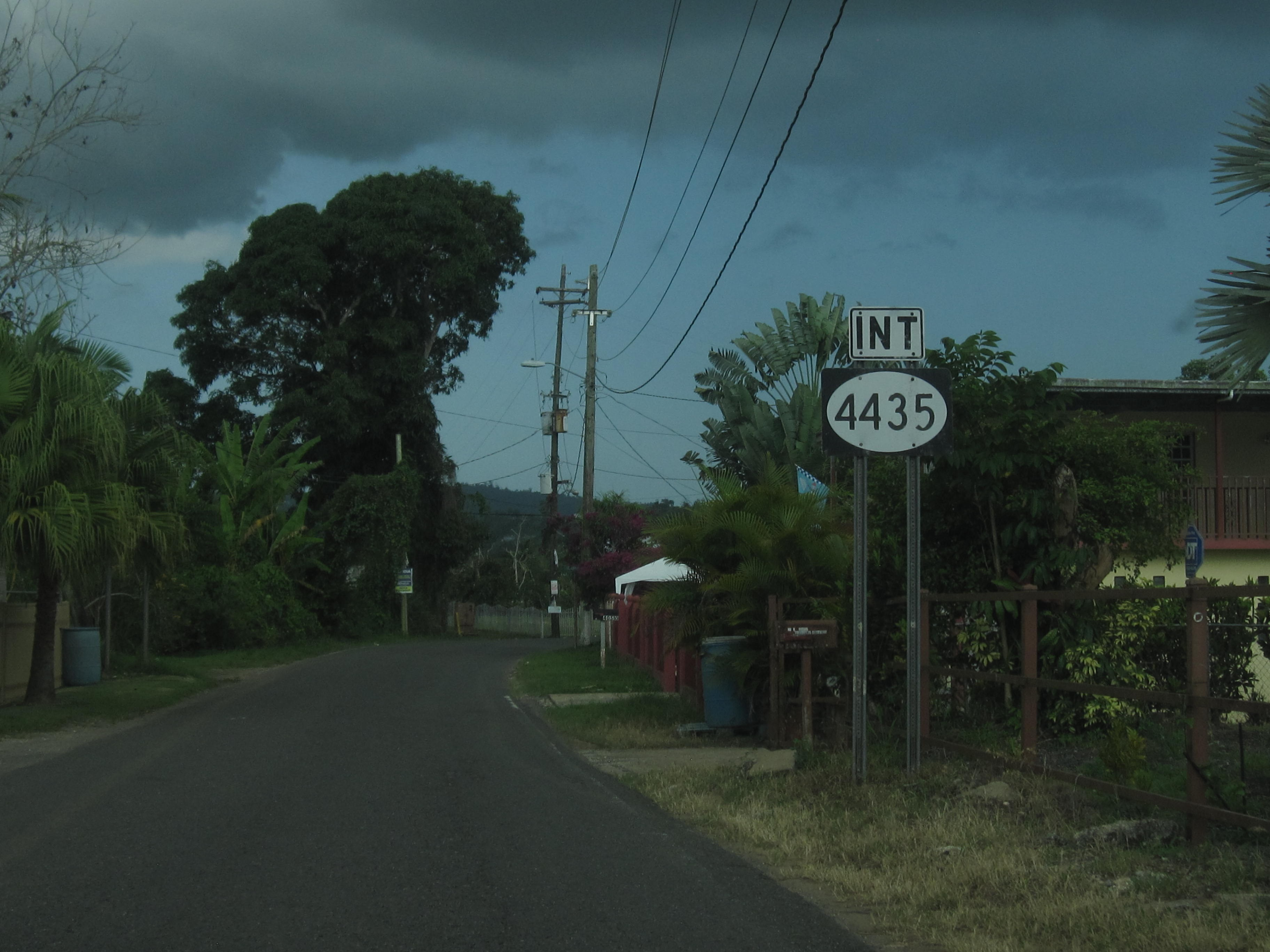
Highway 4435

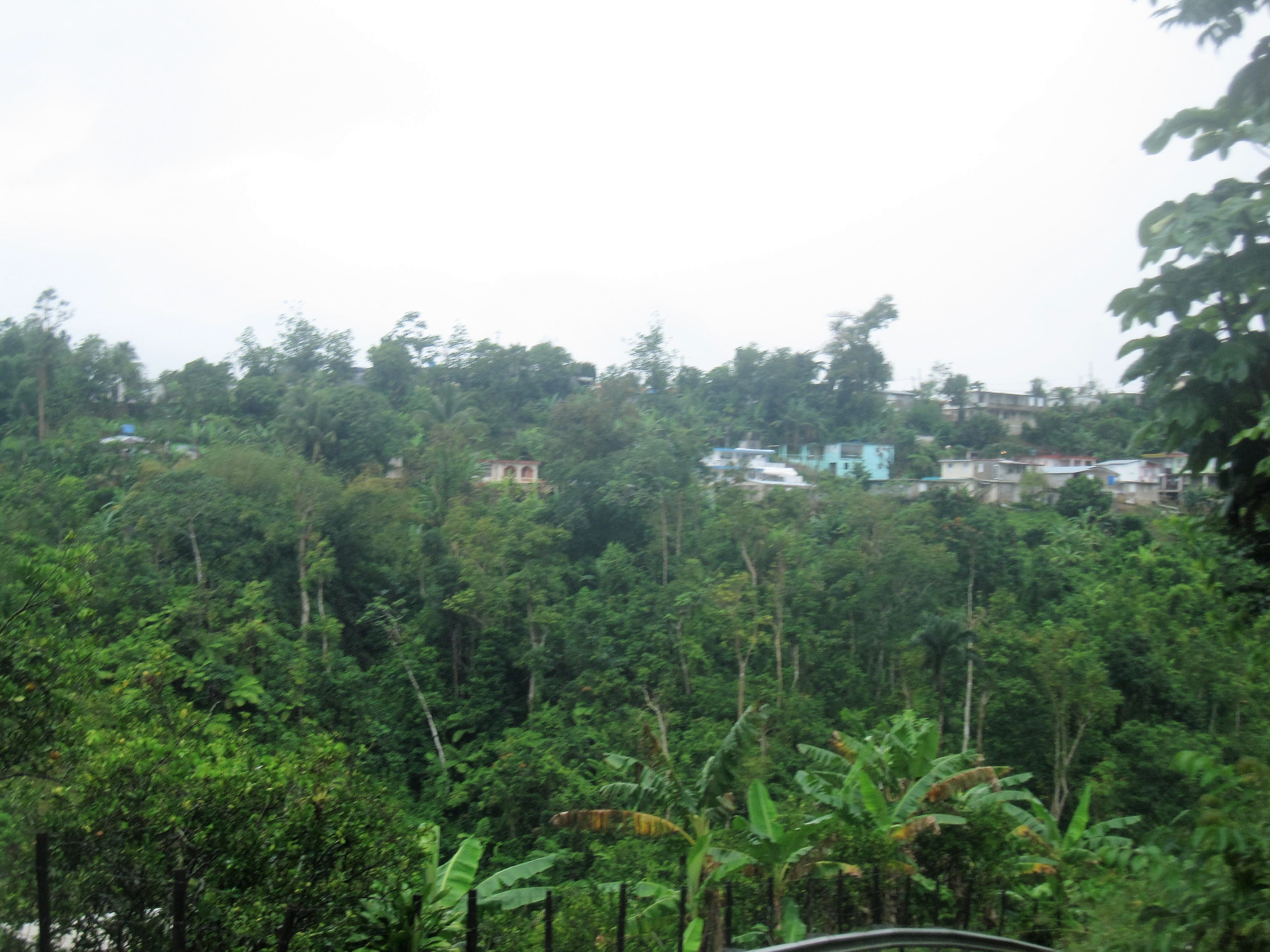
Calabazas

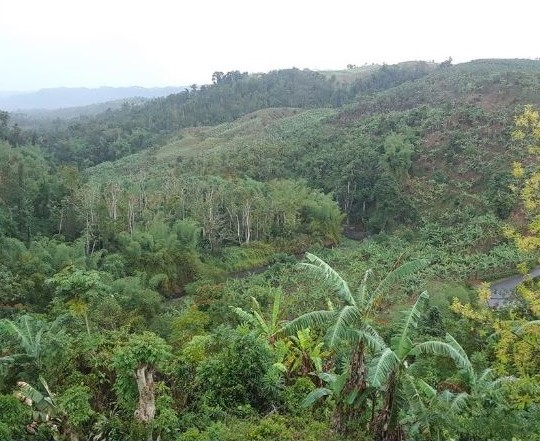
View of ravine near Culebrinas River

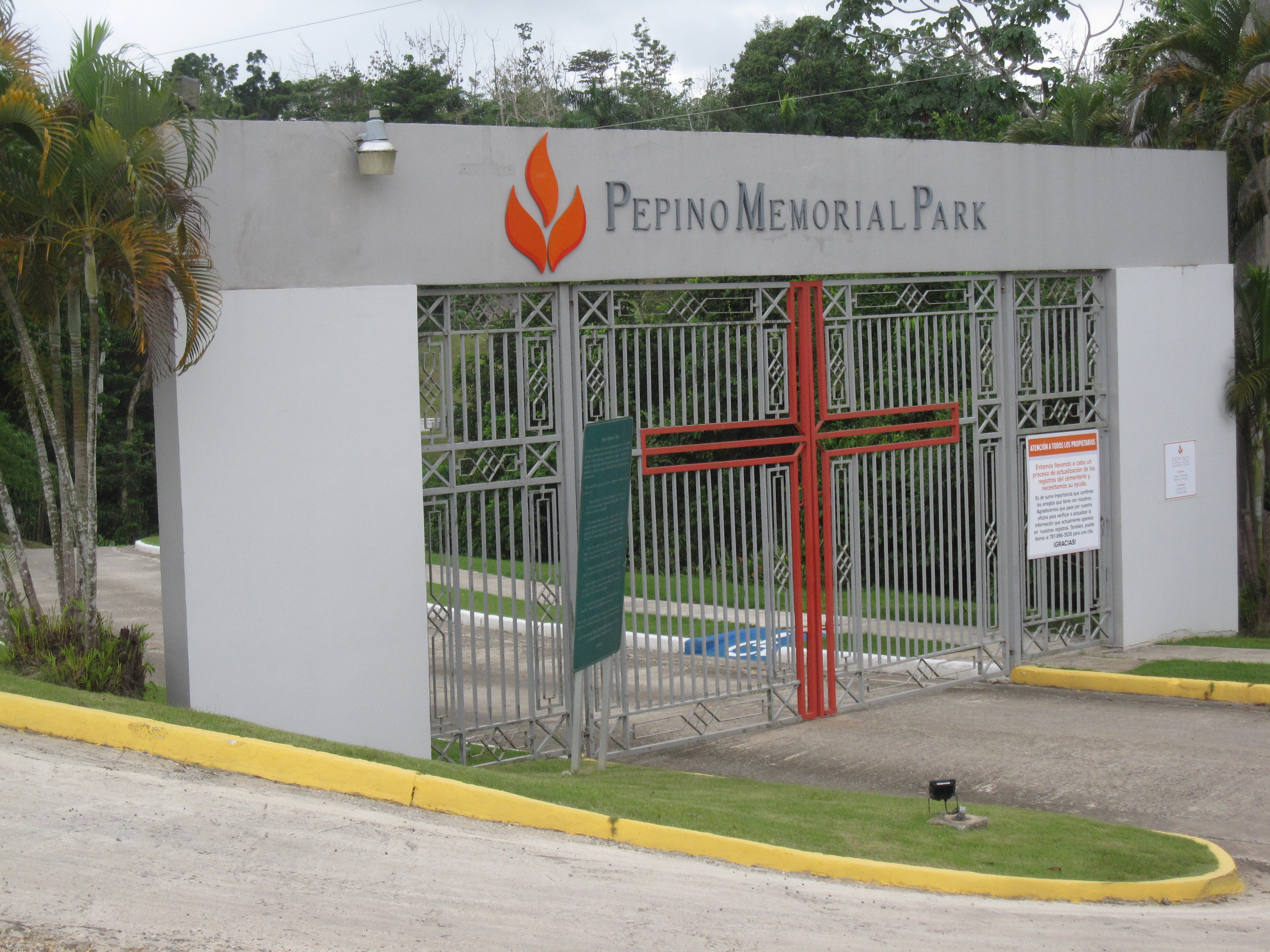
Pepino Memorial Park

== See also ==
- Culebrinas River
- List of communities in Puerto Rico
- List of barrios and sectors of San Sebastián, Puerto Rico
