= Eneas, San Sebastián, Puerto Rico =

Barrio of Puerto Rico

Eneas
- Barrio
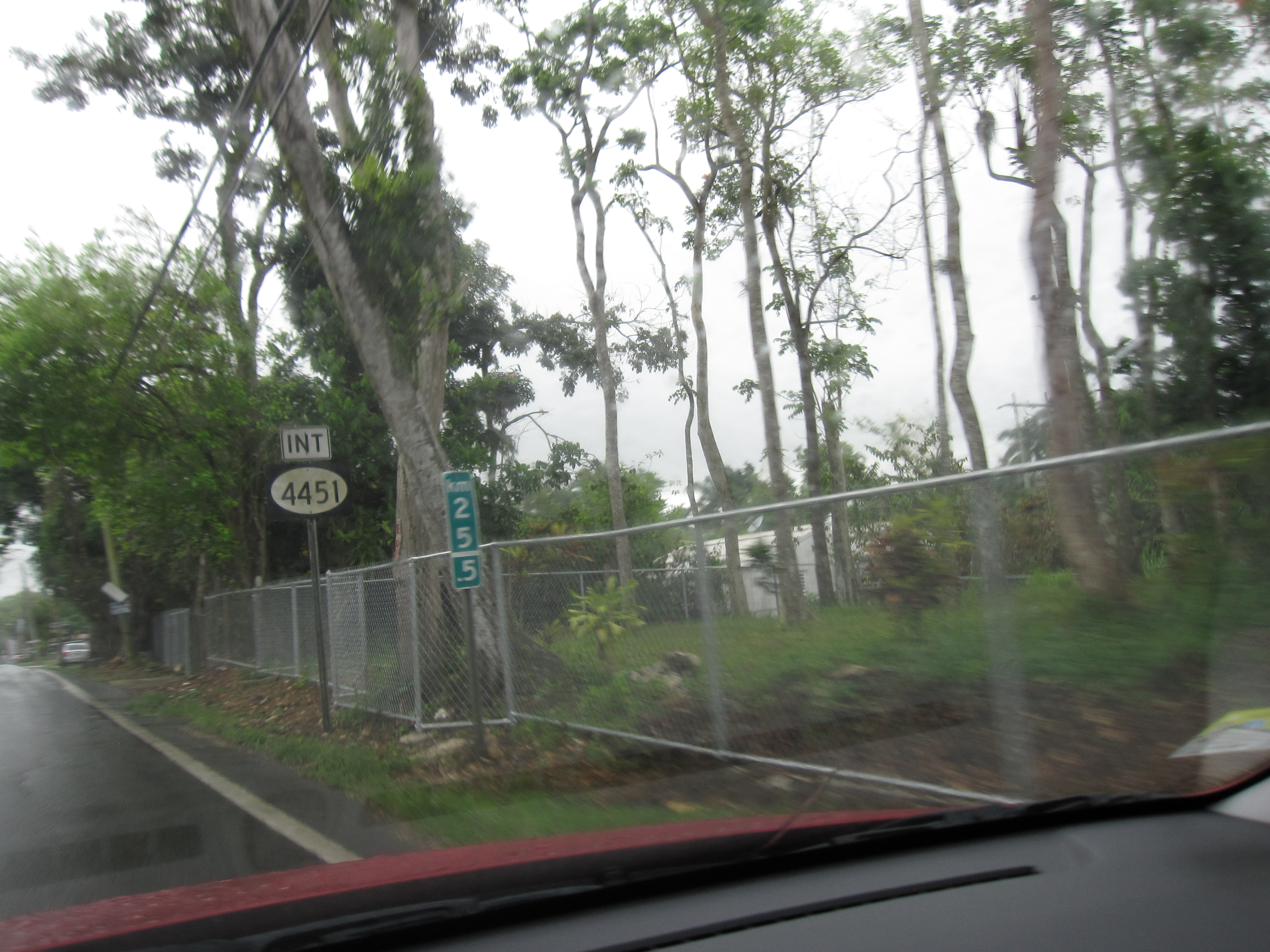
- Driving in rain on PR-4451 in Eneas

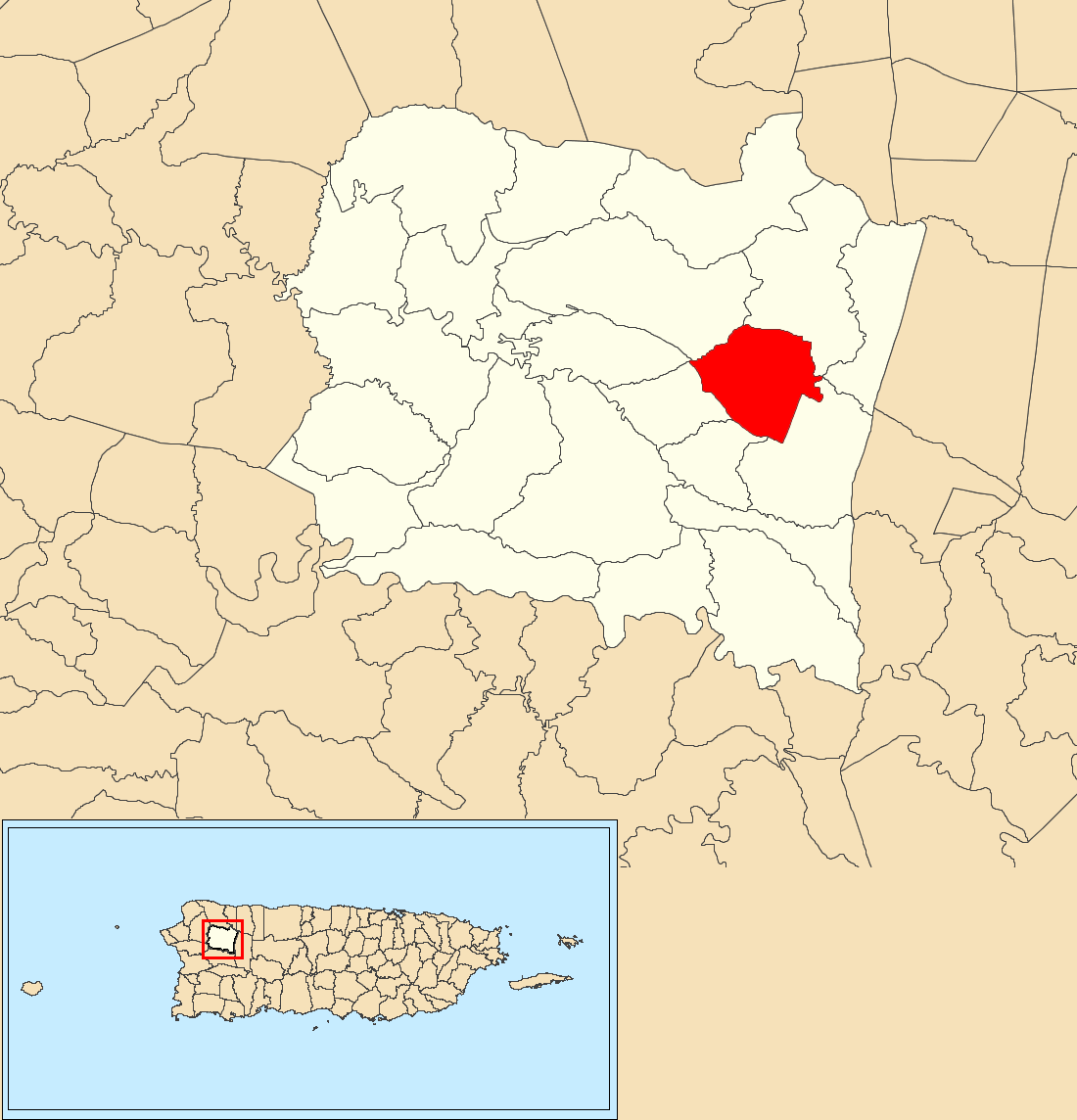
- Location of Eneas within the municipality of San Sebastián shown in red

- Location of Puerto Rico
- Coordinates: 18°19′57″N 66°56′04″W
- Commonwealth: Puerto Rico
- Municipality: San Sebastián

Area
  - Total: 2.51 sq mi (6.5 km^{2})
  - Land: 2.51 sq mi (6.5 km^{2})
  - Water: 0 sq mi (0 km^{2})
- Elevation: 1,129 ft (344 m)

Population (2010)
  - Total: 996
  - Density: 396.8/sq mi (153.2/km^{2})
- Source: 2010 Census
- Time zone: UTC−4 (AST)

Eneas is a barrio in the municipality of San Sebastián, Puerto Rico. The population in 2010 was 996.

== History ==
Eneas was listed in Spain's gazetteers until Puerto Rico was ceded by Spain in the aftermath of the Spanish–American War under the terms of the Treaty of Paris of 1898 and became an unincorporated territory of the United States of the United States. In 1899, the United States Department of War conducted a census of Puerto Rico which found that the combined population of Magos and Eneas barrios was 1,003.

Historical population
Census	Pop.	Note	%±
1910	938		—
1920	840		−10.4%
1930	959		14.2%
1940	1,117		16.5%
1950	1,214		8.7%
1960	808		−33.4%
1970	808		0.0%
1980	773		−4.3%
1990	815		5.4%
2000	912		11.9%
2010	996		9.2%
U.S. Decennial Census; 1900 (N/A) 1910-1930; 1930-1950 1980-2000 2010

== Sectors ==
Barrios (roughly comparable to minor civil divisions in contemporary times) are further subdivided into smaller local populated place areas/units called sectores (sectors in English). The types of sectores may vary, from normally sector to urbanización to reparto to barriada to residencial, among others.

The following sectors are in Eneas barrio:

Sector Brignoni, Sector Delia Ramos, and Sector Loma Alta.

== See also ==
- List of communities in Puerto Rico
- List of barrios and sectors of San Sebastián, Puerto Rico
