= Juncal, San Sebastián, Puerto Rico =

Barrio of Puerto Rico

Juncal
- Barrio
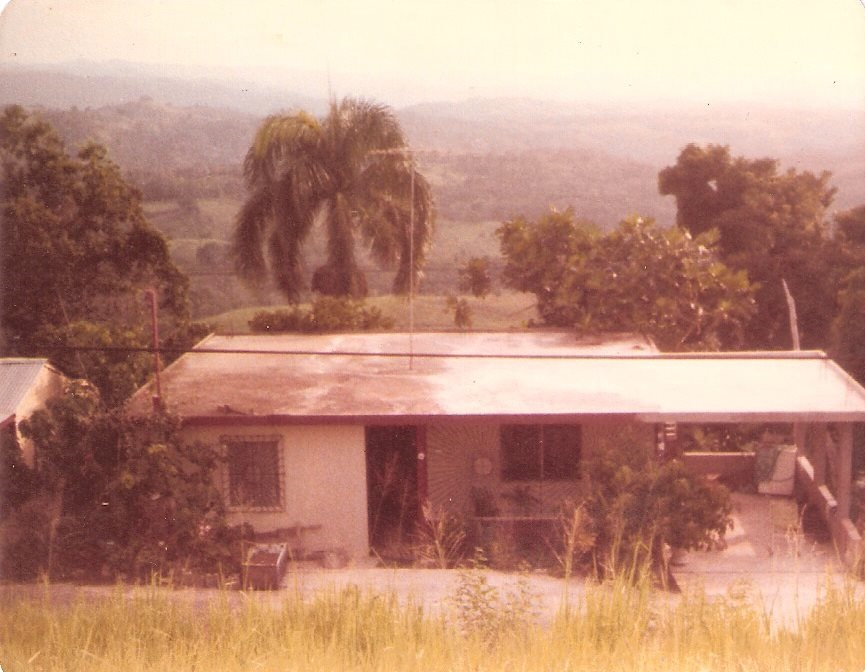
- A home on PR-111 in Juncal from a mountain across the street

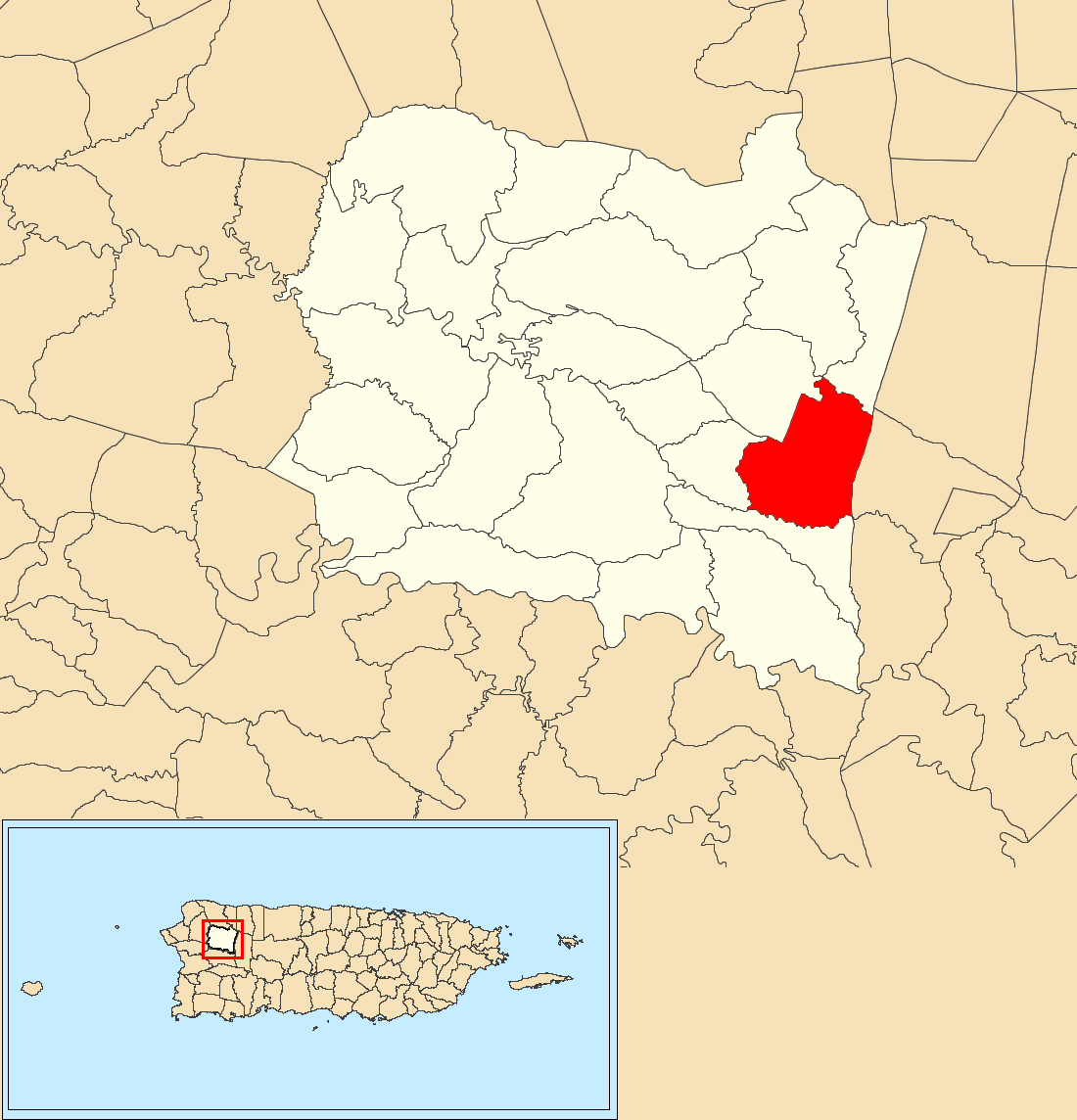
- Location of Juncal within the municipality of San Sebastián shown in red

- Location of Puerto Rico
- Coordinates: 18°18′31″N 66°55′13″W
- Commonwealth: Puerto Rico
- Municipality: San Sebastián

Area
  - Total: 3.3 sq mi (8.5 km^{2})
  - Land: 3.3 sq mi (8.5 km^{2})
  - Water: 0 sq mi (0 km^{2})
- Elevation: 869 ft (265 m)

Population (2010)
  - Total: 1,926
  - Density: 583.6/sq mi (225.3/km^{2})
- Source: 2010 Census
- Time zone: UTC−4 (AST)

Juncal is a barrio in the municipality of San Sebastián, Puerto Rico. Its population in 2010 was 1,926.

== History ==
Juncal was in Spain's gazetteers until Puerto Rico was ceded by Spain in the aftermath of the Spanish–American War under the terms of the Treaty of Paris of 1898 and became an unincorporated territory of the United States. In 1899, the United States Department of War conducted a census of Puerto Rico finding that the population of Juncal barrio was 761.

Historical population
Census	Pop.	Note	%±
1900	761		—
1910	817		7.4%
1920	903		10.5%
1930	1,000		10.7%
1940	1,056		5.6%
1950	1,031		−2.4%
1960	1,051		1.9%
1970	982		−6.6%
1980	1,488		51.5%
1990	1,842		23.8%
2000	2,075		12.6%
2010	1,926		−7.2%
U.S. Decennial Census; 1899 (shown as 1900) 1910-1930; 1930-1950 1980-2000 2010

== Sectors ==
Barrios (which are, in contemporary times, roughly comparable to minor civil divisions) in turn are further subdivided into smaller local populated place areas/units called sectores (sectors in English). The types of sectores may vary, from normally sector to urbanización to reparto to barriada to residencial, among others.

The following sectors are in Juncal barrio:

Carretera 111, Sector Ballajá, Sector Iglesia Adventista (Rodríguez), Sector Juncal Centro, Sector Pueblito, Sector Santiago, and Sector Terraza de Santiago.

== See also ==
- List of communities in Puerto Rico
- List of barrios and sectors of San Sebastián, Puerto Rico
