= Camuy River =

River of Puerto Rico

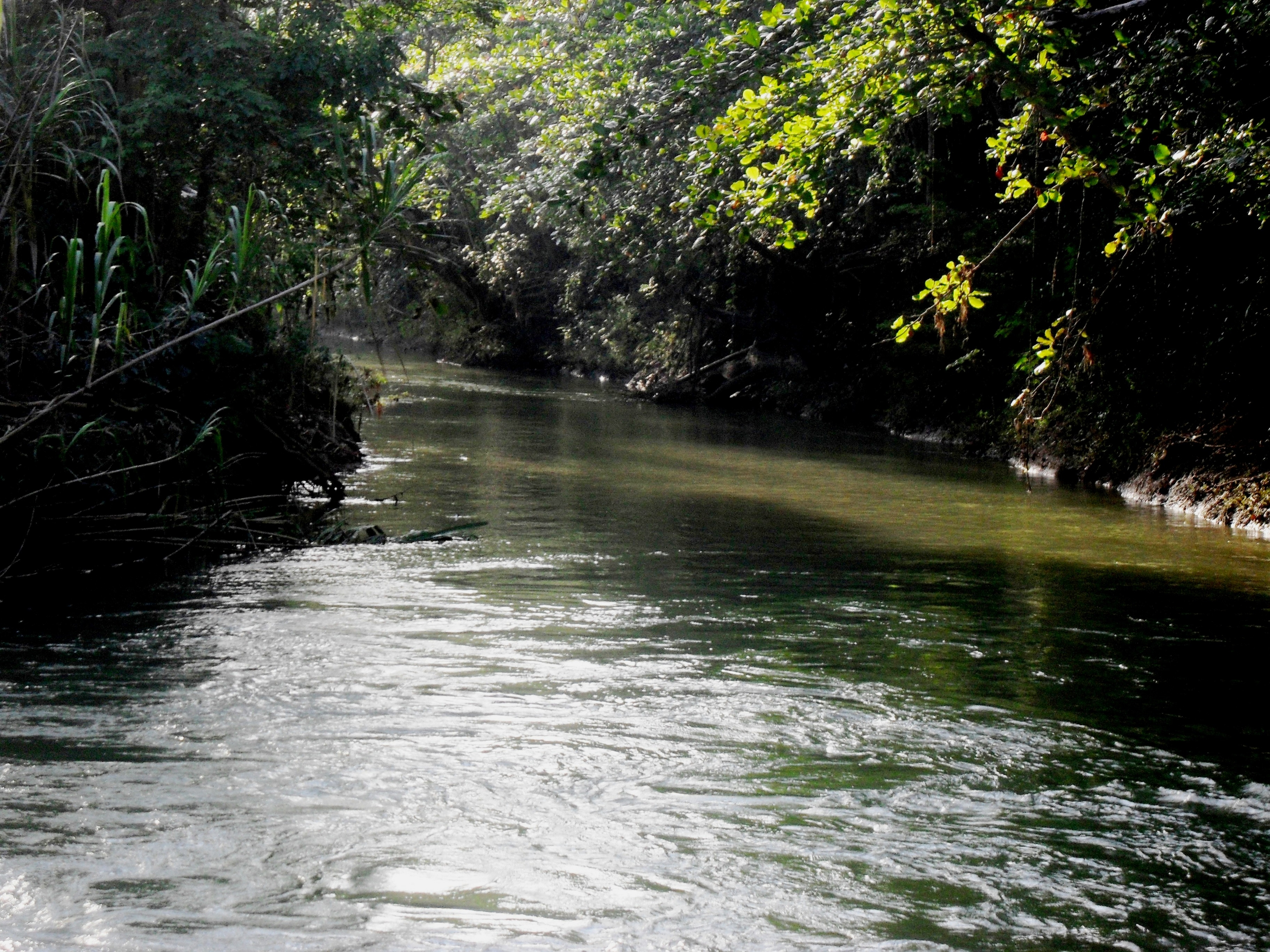
- Camuy River
- Native name: Río Camuy (Spanish)

Location
- Commonwealth: Puerto Rico
- Municipality: Camuy, Hatillo, Lares

Physical characteristics
- Source
  - location: Ángeles and Piedras Rivers confluence in Buenos Aires, Lares
  - coordinates: 18.4877218°N 66.8368437°W
- 2nd source
  - location: Camuy Caverns between the municipalities of Camuy, Hatillo and Lares
- Mouth
  - location: Atlantic Ocean in Camuy Pueblo and Hatillo barrio
- Length: 45 km (28 mi)

Basin features
- Tributaries
  - left: Ángeles River
  - right: Piedras and Criminales Rivers

The Camuy River (Spanish: Río Camuy; Spanish pronunciation: [kaˈmuj]) is a river in Puerto Rico. It is the third longest underground river in the world and helped shape the Camuy River Caverns system.

== Geography ==
The Camuy River has its source at the confluence of the Ángeles and Piedras Rivers at a boundary between the municipalities of Lares and Utuado. From here the river acts as a natural municipal boundary between these two municipalities, as it does between the municipalities of Camuy and Hatillo further north in its path. The river runs underground in a portion that stretches north of the Criminales River mouth in Lares to the barrios of Quebrada and Bayaney in Camuy and Hatillo, respectively. This underground portion is the third longest in any measured river in the world and forms part of the wider Camuy River Caverns. From this point northward, it runs on surface level once again as it crosses the main belt of the Northern Karst country of Puerto Rico, where it forms a limestone canyon surrounded by mogotes. The Camuy River finally empties into the Atlantic Ocean at the boundary between Camuy and Hatillo, close to Camuy Pueblo.

The river and its water flow systems have been studied by the US Geological Service in 1995.

== Ecology ==
The Camuy River runs through some of the most extensive forests with the highest biodiversity in Puerto Rico, relatively undisturbed due to the ruggedness of the karstic landscape. The basin is protected by the Camuy Caverns River Park, which preserves the caves, sinkholes and underground portion of the river, and the Camuy River Nature Reserve, which protects the limestone canyon portion of the river. Although not directly located along the river, the Finca Nolla Nature Reserve preserves the coastal area located immediately west of the river mouth, prominent for its sand dunes and wetlands which attract numerous bird species.

== Recreation ==
The Camuy Caverns River Park (Parque Nacional de las Cavernas del Río Camuy) is a state park established in 1987 by the Puerto Rico National Parks Company (Compañía de Parques Nacionales de Puerto Rico) to provide interpretation and access to some of the landmarks created by the hydrological karst relief in the area. Gran Parque del Norte is another recreational area, located at the Camuy River mouth in the Atlantic Ocean, managed by the municipality of Hatillo, it also provides access to Río Mar Beach.

== Gallery ==
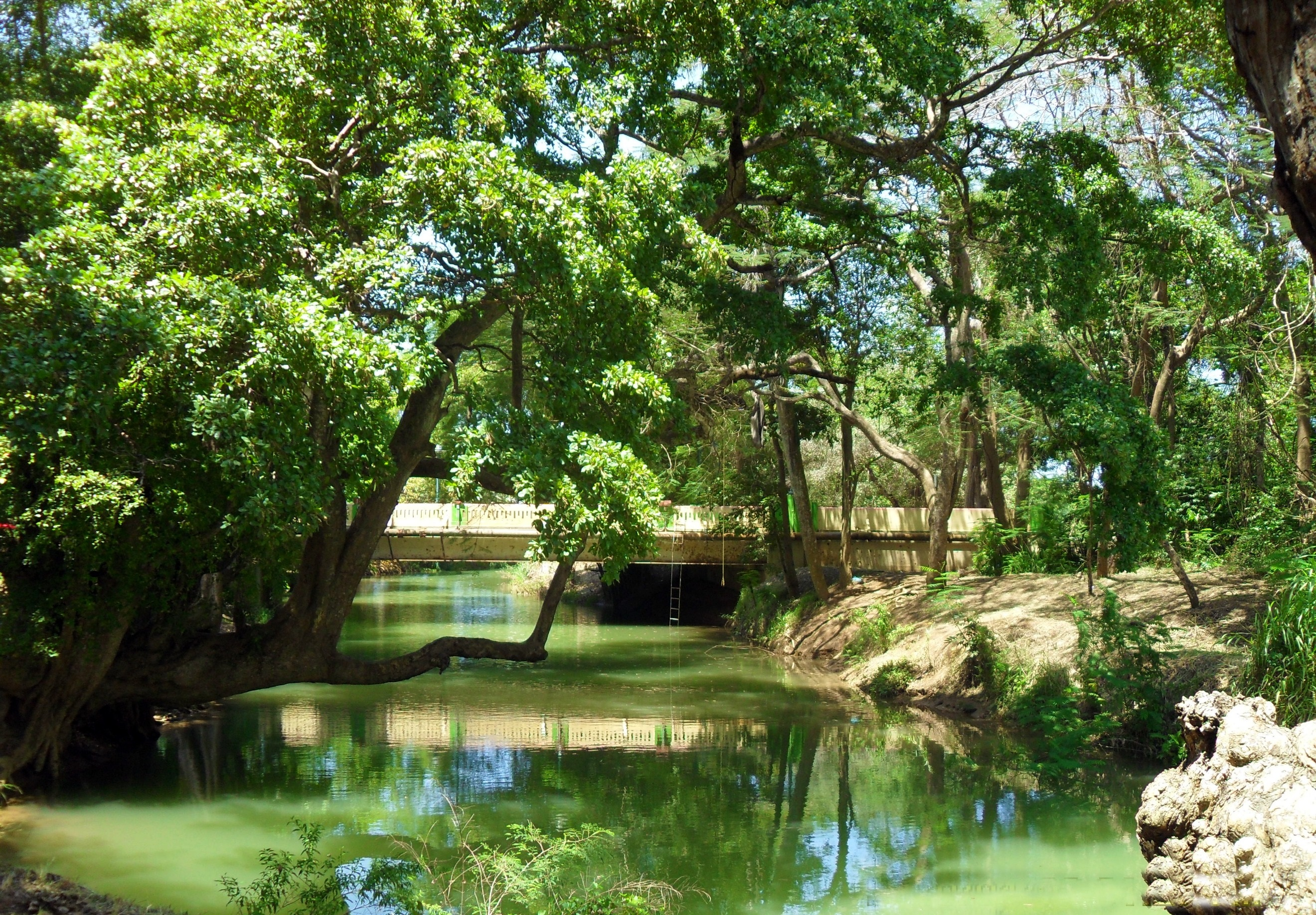
Río Camuy with pedestrian bridge

== See also ==
- List of rivers of Puerto Rico
