= Hatillo =

Hatillo or El Hatillo may refer to the following places:

== Colombia ==
- Hatillo de Loba, a municipality in the department of Bolívar

== Costa Rica ==
- Hatillo (district), in San José Canton

== Honduras ==
- El Hatillo, Honduras, a colonia in the department of Francisco Morazán

== Puerto Rico ==
- Hatillo, Puerto Rico, a municipality
- Hatillo, Añasco, Puerto Rico, a barrio
- Hatillo, Hatillo, Puerto Rico, a barrio

== Venezuela ==
- El Hatillo Municipality, a municipality in the state of Miranda
- El Hatillo, Miranda, a town in the state of Miranda
