= Aibonito (disambiguation) =

Aibonito may refer to:

== Places ==
- Aibonito, Puerto Rico, a municipality
- Aibonito, Hatillo, Puerto Rico, a barrio
- Aibonito, San Sebastián, Puerto Rico, a barrio
- Aibonito barrio-pueblo, a barrio
