= Ángeles River =

River of Puerto Rico

Coordinates: 18.2757866°N 66.8329537°W

- Native name: Río Ángeles (Spanish)

Location
- Commonwealth: Puerto Rico
- Municipality: Lares

Physical characteristics
- Source
  - elevation: 1129 ft.
- Mouth
  - location: Camuy River

The Ángeles River (Spanish: Río Ángeles) is a river of Lares, Puerto Rico. The river has its source in the Cordillera Central, in the Buenos Aires barrio of Lares. It flows northeastwardly, forming the natural boundary between the Lares (not to be confused with Lares Pueblo) and Buenos Aires barrios of the municipality before meeting with the Piedras River at its source in the Camuy River.

== See also ==
- List of rivers of Puerto Rico
