= Parque Nacional de las Cavernas del Río Camuy =

Cave system in Camuy, Puerto Rico

Coordinates: 18°19′32″N 66°50′17″W

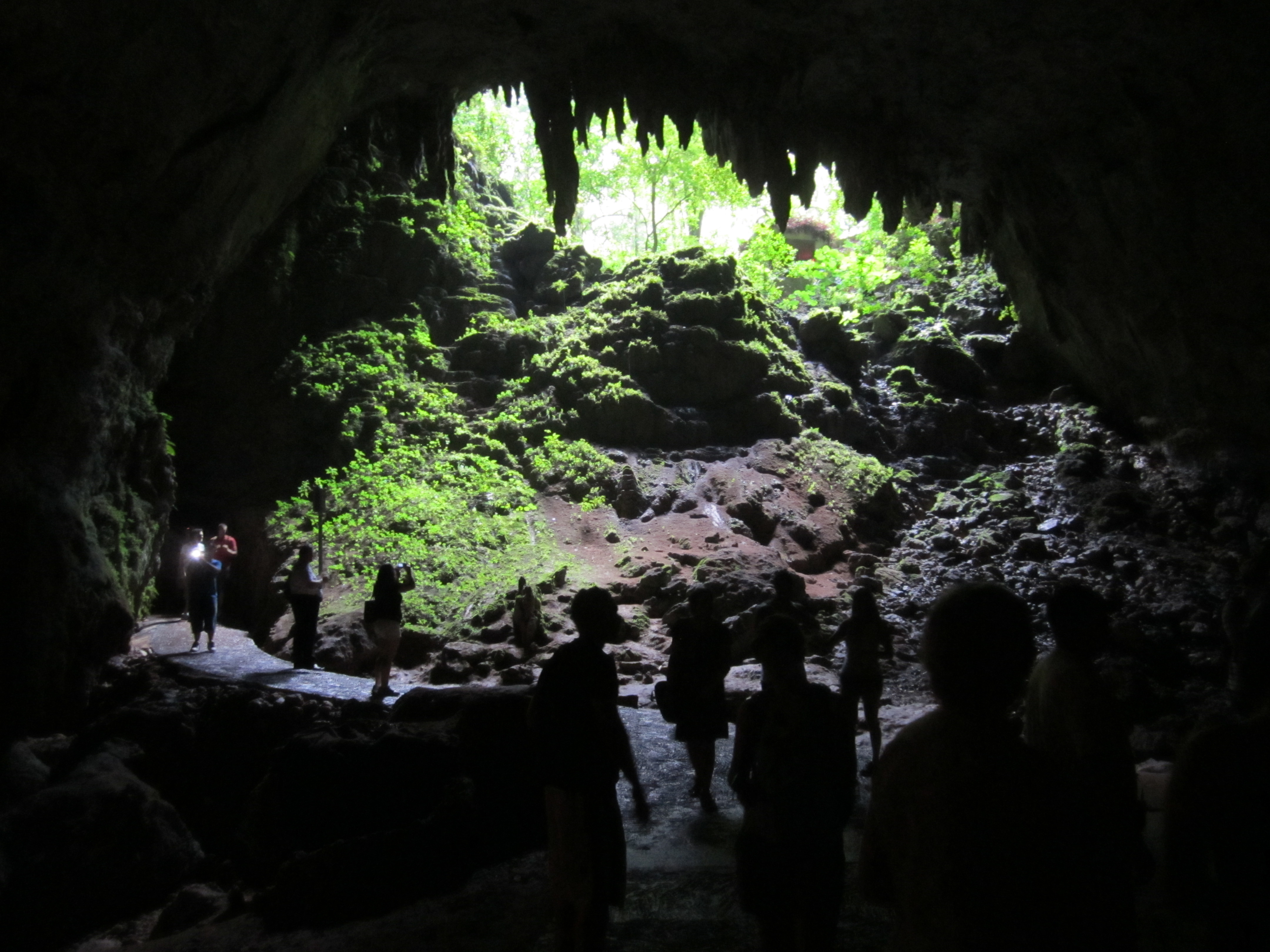
- Entrance to Cueva Clara, as seen from inside
- Interactive map of Parque Nacional de las Cavernas del Río Camuy
- Location: Camuy, Hatillo, and Lares, Puerto Rico
- Nearest city: Lares, Puerto Rico
- Area: 268 acres (108 ha)
- Established: 1987
- Visitors: 150000 (in 2009)
- Governing body: Compañía de Parques Nacionales de Puerto Rico

The Parque Nacional de las Cavernas del Río Camuy (English: Camuy River Cave National Park) is a cave system in Puerto Rico. It is located between the municipalities of Camuy, Hatillo, and Lares in northwestern Puerto Rico, but the main entrance to the park is located in Quebrada, Camuy. The caverns are part of a large network of natural limestone caves and underground waterways carved out by the third-largest underground river in the world, the Río Camuy (Camuy River). The cave system was "discovered" in 1958 and was first documented in the 1973 book Discovery at the Río Camuy (ISBN 0-517-50594-0) by Russell and Jeanne Gurnee, but there is archaeological evidence that these caves were explored hundreds of years ago by the Taíno Indians, Puerto Rico's first inhabitants. Over 10 miles of caverns, 220 caves and 17 entrances to the Camuy cave system have been mapped so far. This, however, is only a fraction of the entire system which many experts believe still holds another 800 caves. Only a small part of the complex is open to the public. The 268-acre park built around the cave system features tours of some of the caves and sinkholes, and is one of the most popular natural attractions in Puerto Rico. After restorations necessitated by Hurricane Maria, a destructive storm that struck Puerto Rico in 2017, the park re-opened on March 24, 2021. It then closed again from September 2022 until February 2023 due to Hurricane Fiona.

== Attractions ==
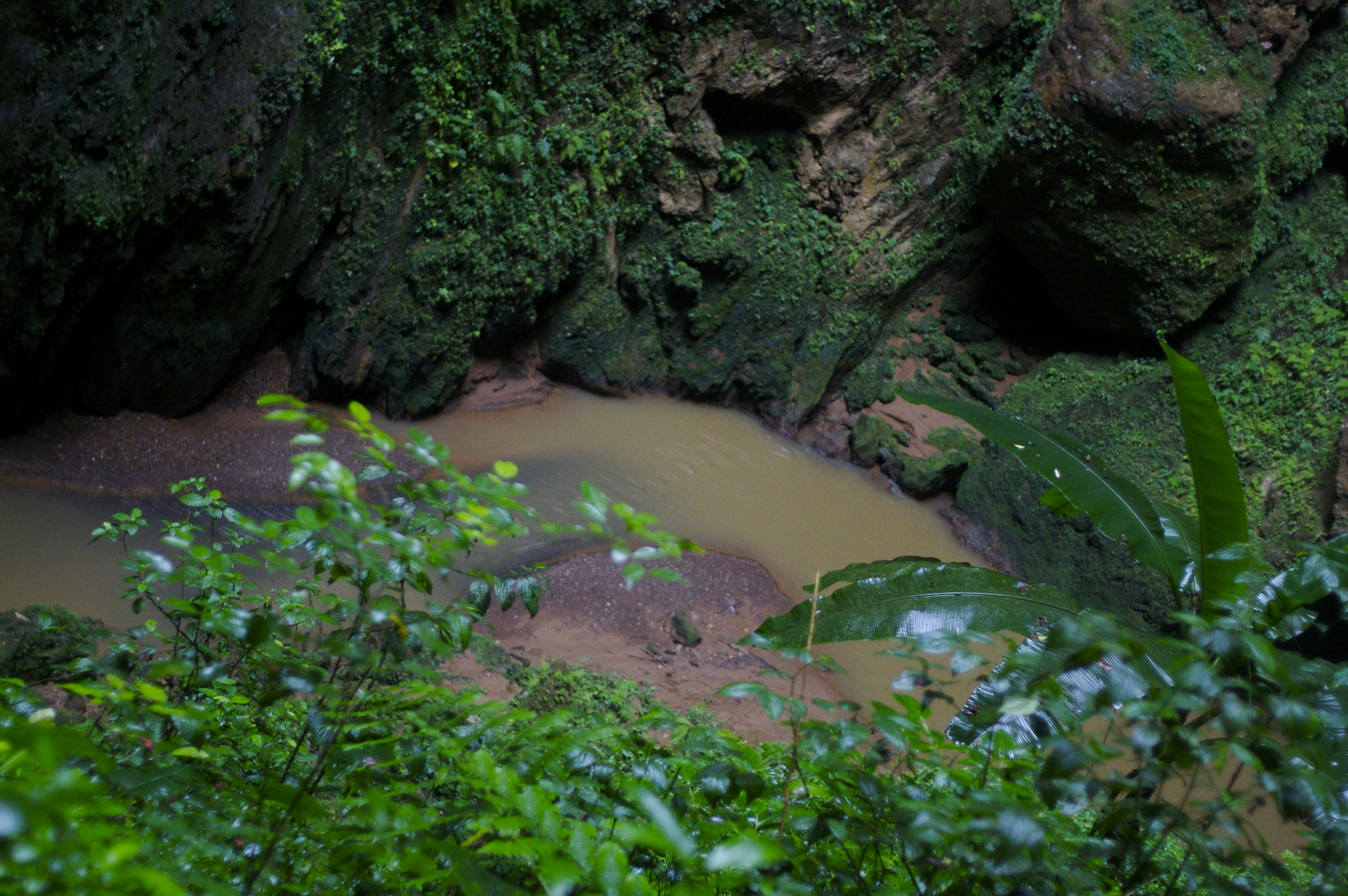
Underground Río Camuy in Camuy

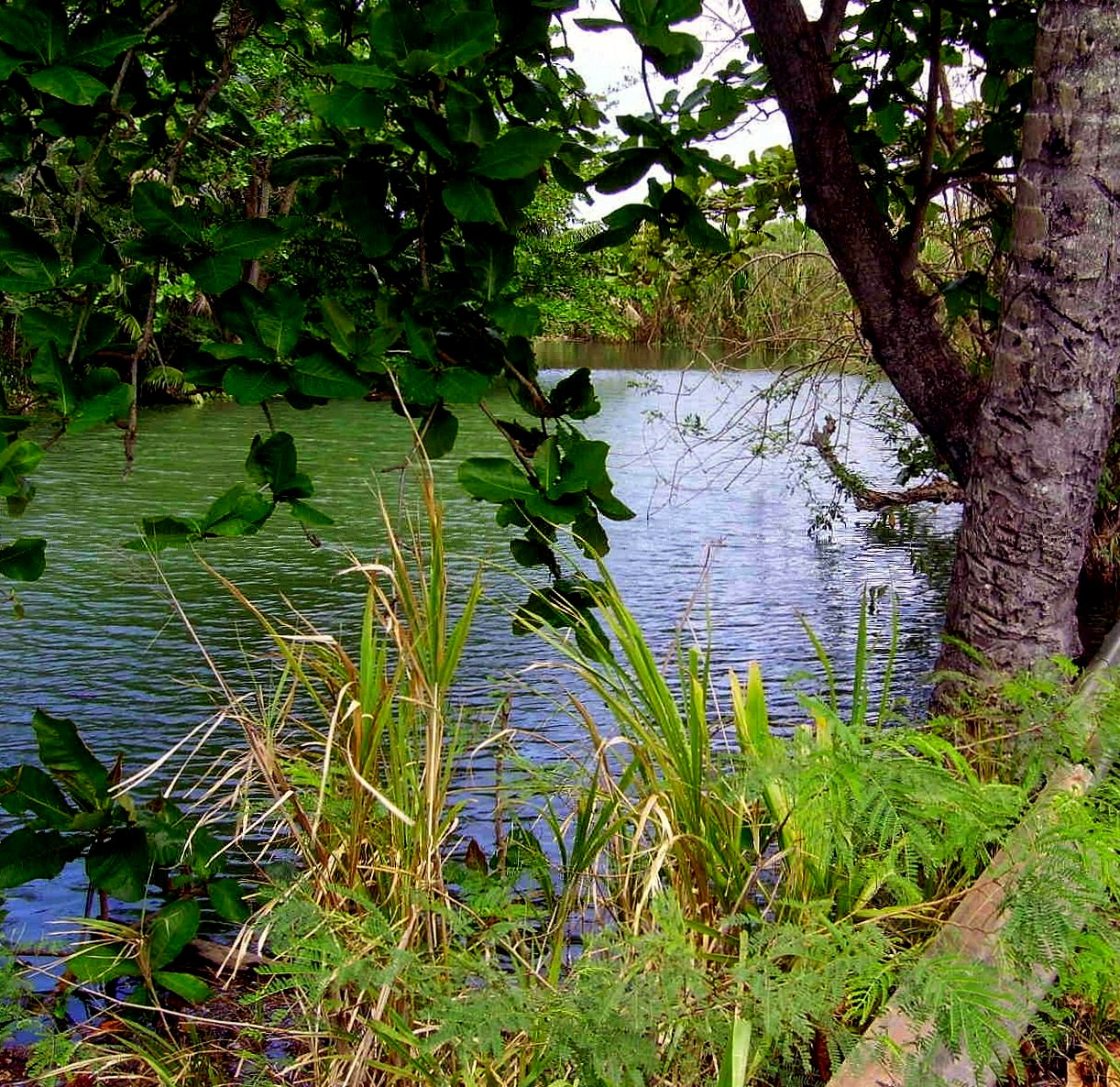
The Camuy River

=== Clara Cave and Empalme Sinkhole (Cueva Clara y Sumidero de Empalme) ===
"Cueva Clara de Empalme" or Clara Cave is the main attraction at the Rio Camuy Cave Park. A single chamber of this cave system has been developed for the public, starting in 1986. Regular cavern guided tour and audio tours are available at the site. Since November 2010, night tours called ECO NIGHTS have been organized weekly under special reservations. The tours start with the screening a short movie in a 90-seat theater, explaining the Rio Camuy Cave System and site safety rules, followed by a train ride that takes visitors into the entrance of Clara Cave. The huge chamber is 700 ft (212m) in length and 215 ft (65m) high. Once inside this chamber, visitors are able to see an entrance from the roof of "Sumidero de Empalme" that is 60m from the surface, as well as stalactites, stalagmites, unique formations and thousands of bats.

=== Spiral Cave and Sinkhole (Cueva y Sumidero de Espiral) ===
Visitors must be in good physical conditions in order to walk into "Cueva Clara" and reach "Sumidero y Cueva Espiral" to see the mouth of this cave. They must go down to it through a scenic 205-step boardwalk. The challenge is getting the way back to the tram. Once walking down the 205 steps into the sinkhole, the cave itself is off limits to reach. Only experienced spelunkers can penetrate the cave and the underground river with special permission from the National Parks Company of Puerto Rico. This sinkhole is believed to have once been an enormous cavern that collapsed thousands of years ago. At the opening of the cave there is an impressive sight.

=== Tri-Towns Sinkhole ("Sumidero Tres Pueblos") ===
"Sumidero Tres Pueblos" is a giant sinkhole measuring 650 ft (195m) wide. The Camuy River can be seen 400 ft (120m) below from three observation platforms that are located at different points alongside the opening of the impressive crater. The sinkhole is located where the borders of the towns of Camuy, Hatillo and Lares meet. Each town has its own platform overlooking the sinkhole.

== Statistics ==
The Camuy River Cave Park is home to more than 13 species of bats, and hundreds of other insect, arachnid and frog species.

The Río Camuy is the world's third-largest subterranean river.

The park closes once reaches its 1,500 visitors daily capacity.

16 entrances, over 220 caves, two other smaller cave systems and more than 10 miles have been mapped so far and experts still say the cave system could be much larger.

== Gallery ==
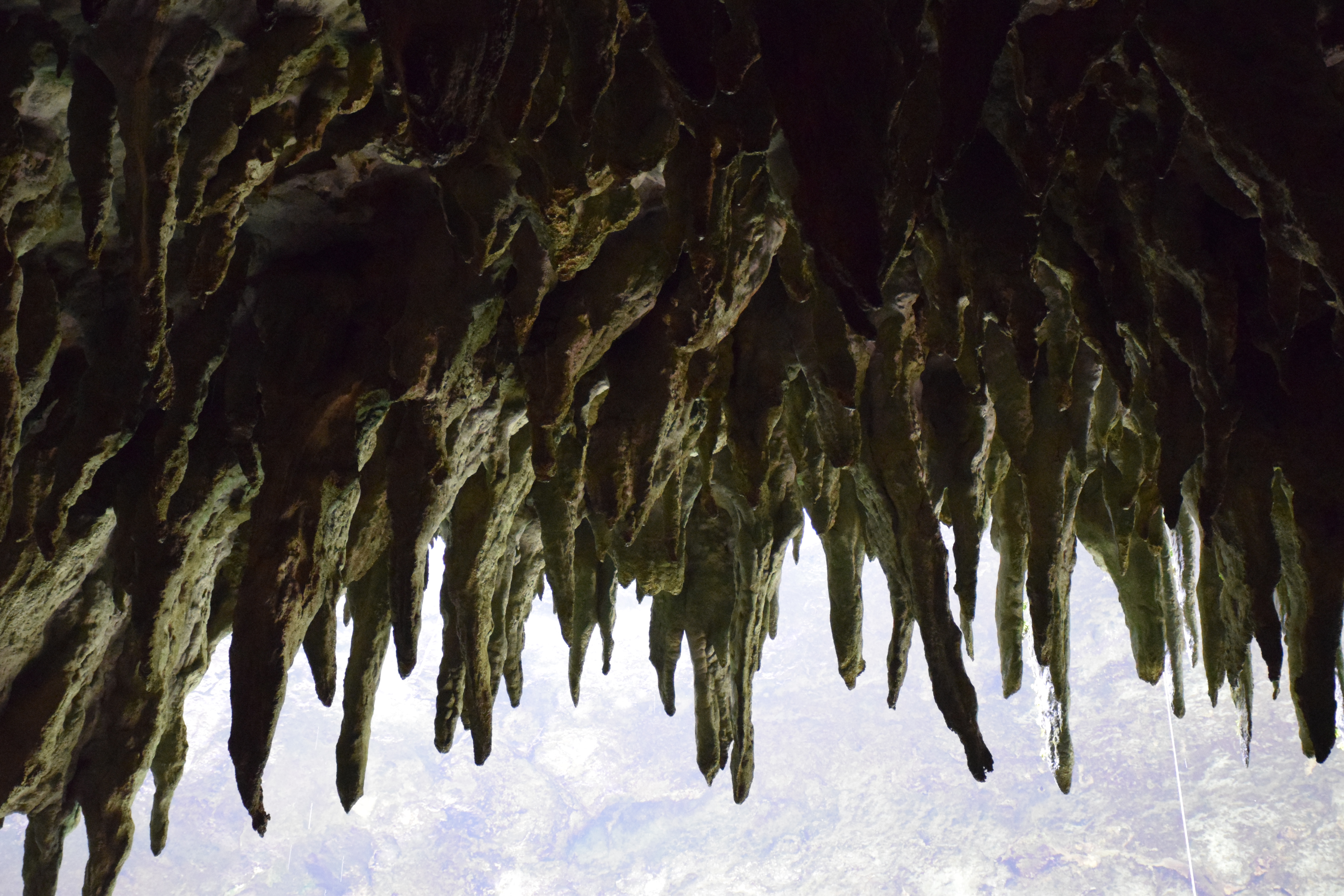
Stalactites in Camuy River Cave National Park

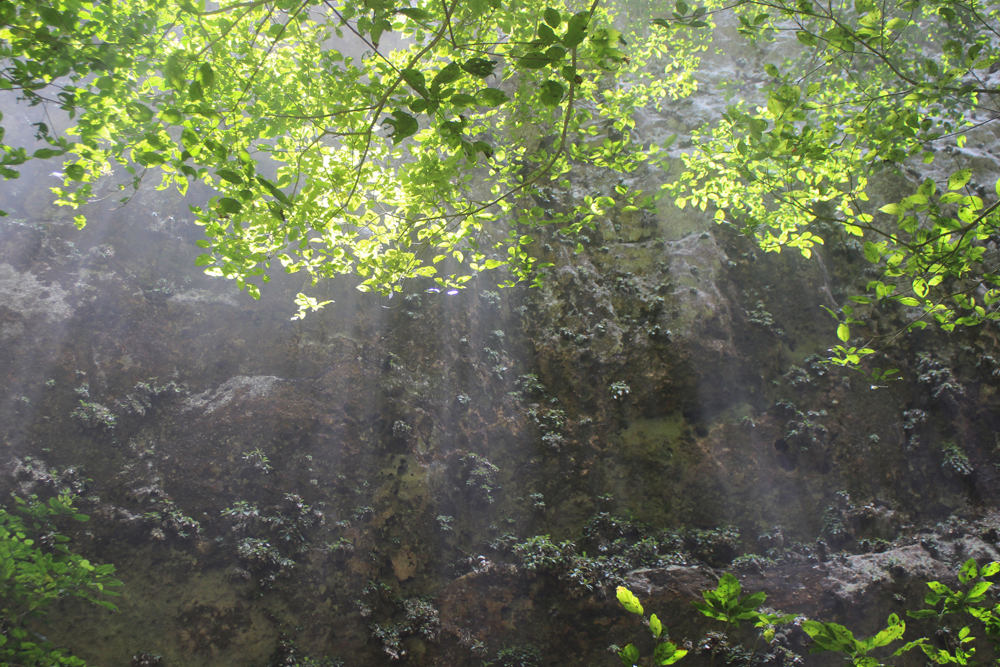
Inside the cavern

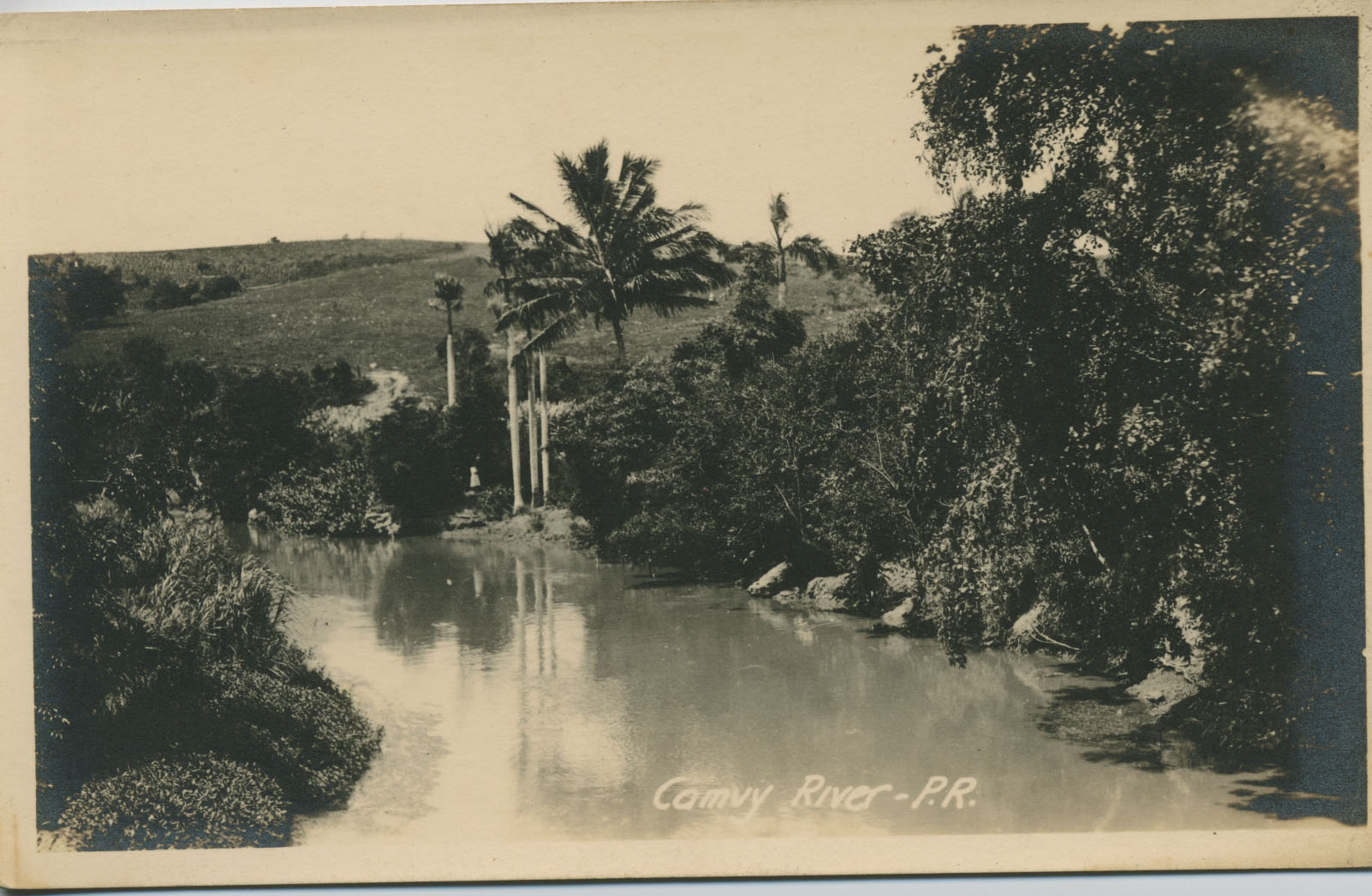
Camuy River circa 1900–1917

== Books and articles ==
- Discovery at the Rio Camuy (amazon link) by Russell & Jeanne Gurnee
- Puerto Rico Opens Brand New Attractions (google link)
