= Criminales River =

River of Puerto Rico

Coordinates: 18.3035632°N 66.8235093°W

- Native name: Río Criminales (Spanish)

Location
- Commonwealth: Puerto Rico
- Municipality: Utuado, Lares

Physical characteristics
- Source
  - location: Utuado
  - elevation: 909 ft.
- Mouth
  - location: Camuy River in Lares

Criminales River (Spanish: Río Criminales) is a river of Utuado, Puerto Rico.

== See also ==
- List of rivers of Puerto Rico
