= Carrizales, Hatillo, Puerto Rico =

Barrio of Puerto Rico

Carrizales
- Barrio
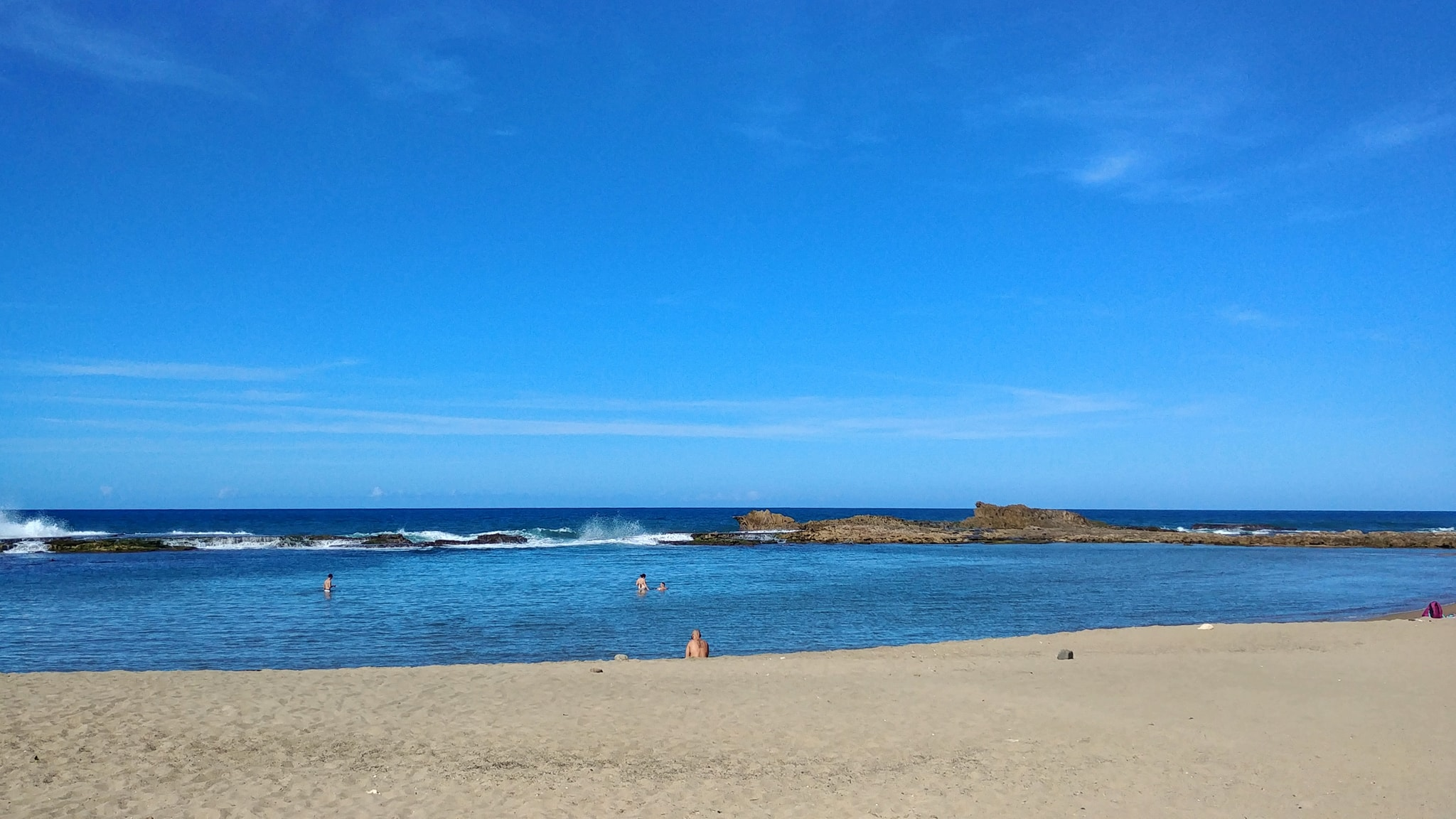
- Sardinera Beach in Carrizales

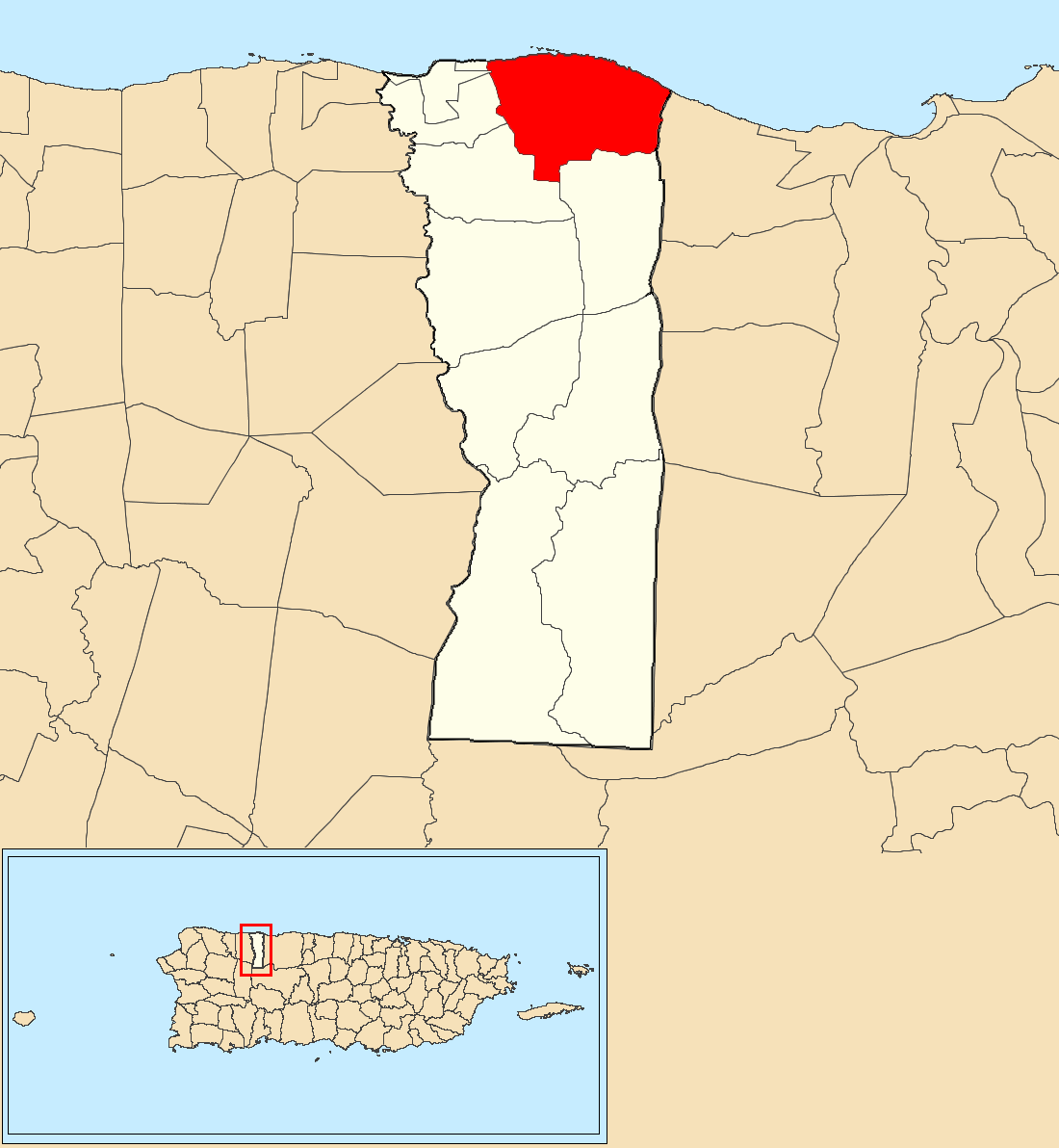
- Location of Carrizales within the municipality of Hatillo shown in red

- Location of Puerto Rico
- Coordinates: 18°28′40″N 66°47′18″W
- Commonwealth: Puerto Rico
- Municipality: Hatillo

Area
  - Total: 5.09 sq mi (13.2 km^{2})
  - Land: 4.4 sq mi (11 km^{2})
  - Water: 0.69 sq mi (1.8 km^{2})
- Elevation: 108 ft (33 m)

Population (2010)
  - Total: 8,066
  - Density: 1,833.2/sq mi (707.8/km^{2})
- Source: 2010 Census
- Time zone: UTC−4 (AST)
- ZIP code: 00659

Carrizales is a rural, coastal barrio in the municipality of Hatillo, Puerto Rico. Its population in 2010 was 8,066.

Historical population
Census	Pop.	Note	%±
1900	969		—
1910	1,068		10.2%
1920	1,113		4.2%
1930	1,263		13.5%
1940	1,451		14.9%
1950	1,509		4.0%
1960	2,267		50.2%
1970	3,079		35.8%
1980	3,787		23.0%
1990	4,650		22.8%
2000	6,807		46.4%
2010	8,066		18.5%
U.S. Decennial Census; 1899 (shown as 1900) 1910-1930; 1930-1950 1980-2000 2010

== History ==
Carrizales was in Spain's gazetteers until Puerto Rico was ceded by Spain in the aftermath of the Spanish–American War under the terms of the Treaty of Paris of 1898 and became an unincorporated territory of the United States. In 1899, the United States Department of War conducted a census of Puerto Rico finding that the population of Carrizales barrio was 969.

== Gallery ==
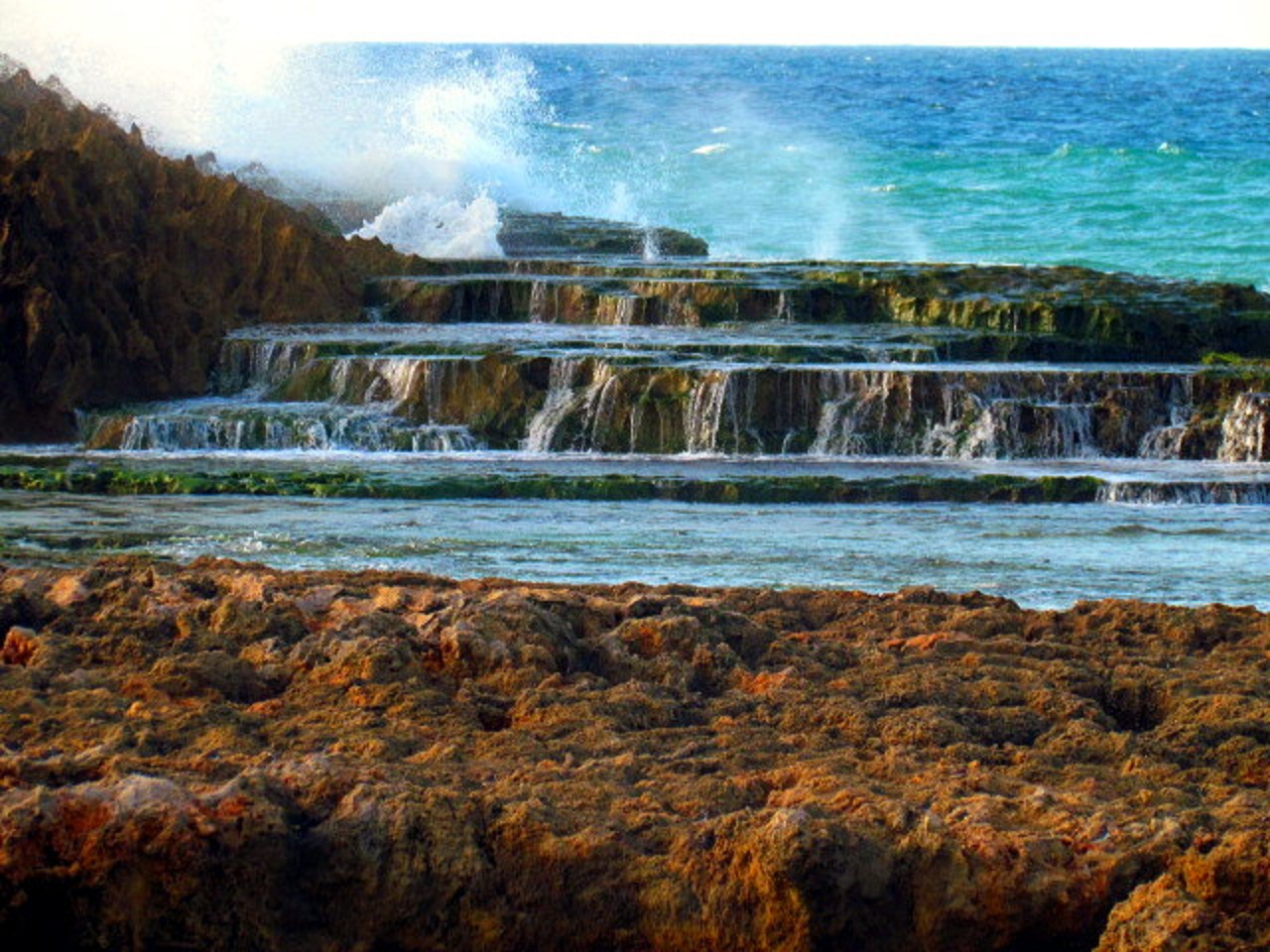
Playa La Sardinera in Carrizales

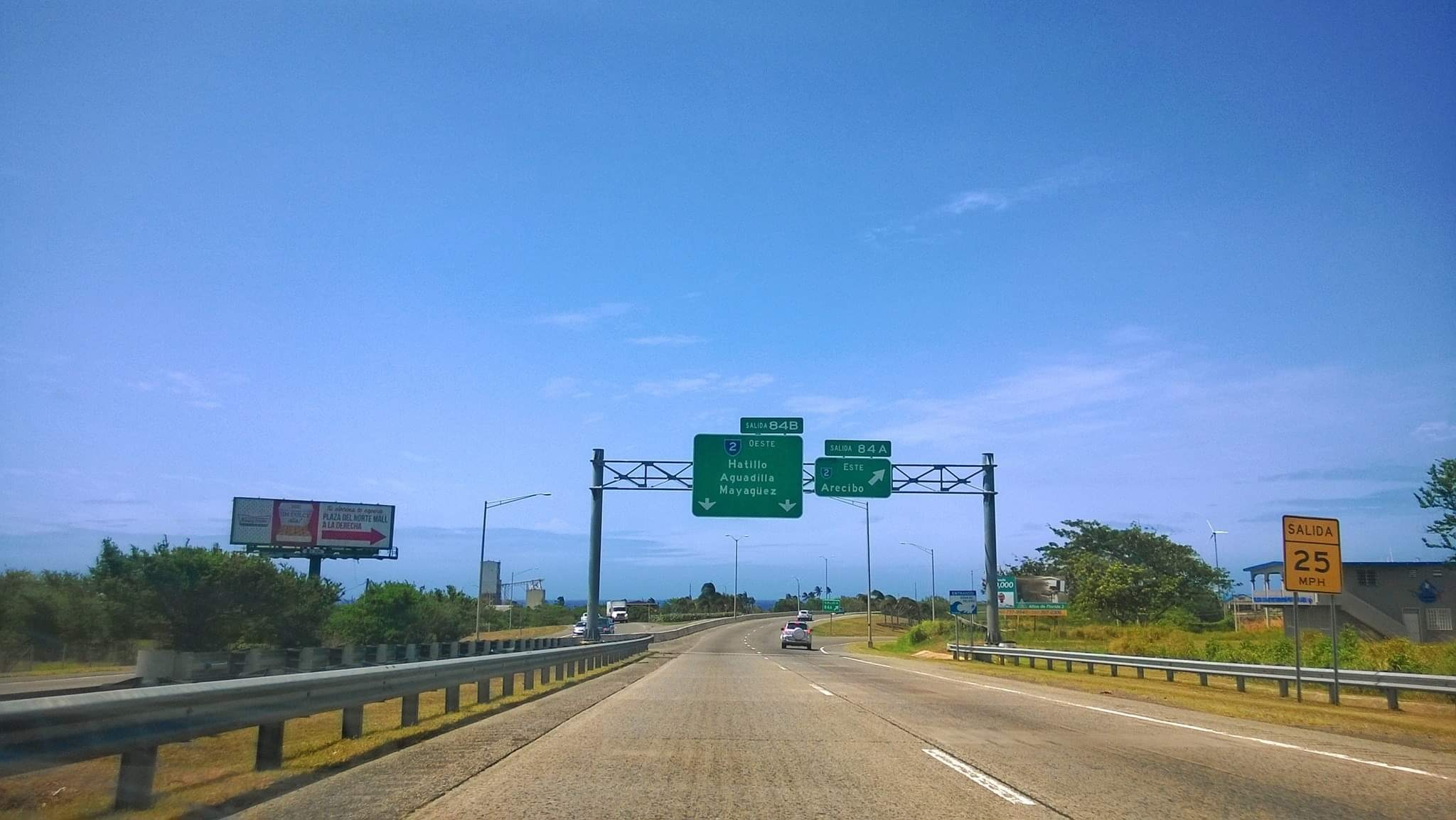
Puerto Rico Highway 22 in Carrizales

== See also ==
- List of communities in Puerto Rico
