= Iglesia de Nuestra Señora del Carmen =

Historic church in Hatillo, Puerto Rico

- Church Nuestra Señora del Carmen of Hatillo
- U.S. National Register of Historic Places
- Puerto Rico Historic Sites and Zones
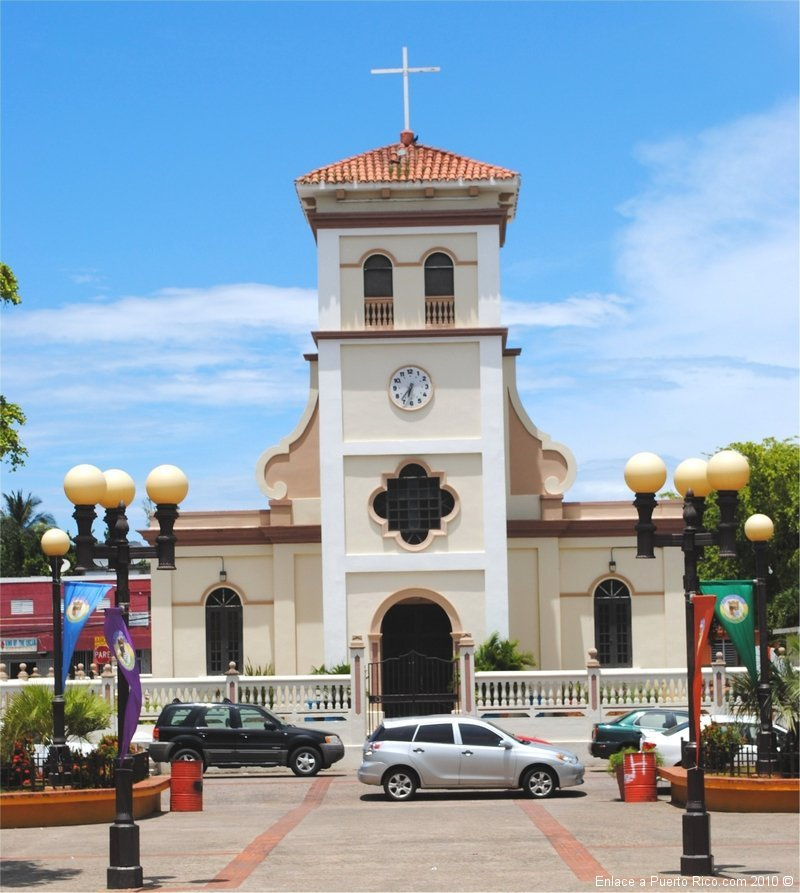
- The church in 2010

- Location within Puerto Rico
- Location: Luis M. Lacomba Street; Hatillo, Puerto Rico
- Coordinates: 18°29′12″N 66°49′31″W
- Built: 1879
- Architect: Beibal, Pedro A.
- Architectural style: Colonial, Spanish Colonial
- MPS: Historic Churches of Puerto Rico MPS
- NRHP reference No.: 84000443
- RNSZH No.: 2000-(RN)-20-JP-SH

Significant dates
- Added to NRHP: December 10, 1984
- Designated RNSZH: December 21, 2000

The Iglesia de Nuestra Señora del Carmen (English: Church of Our Lady of Mount Carmel) is a church in Hatillo, Puerto Rico dating from 1879. It was listed on the National Register of Historic Places in 1984 and on the Puerto Rico Register of Historic Sites and Zones in 2000.

It was designed by Pedro A. Beibal.

It is one of 31 churches reviewed for listing on the National Register in 1984.
