= Hatillo barrio-pueblo =

Historical and administrative center (seat) of Hatillo, Puerto Rico

Hatillo barrio-pueblo Pueblo de Hatillo
- Municipality Seat
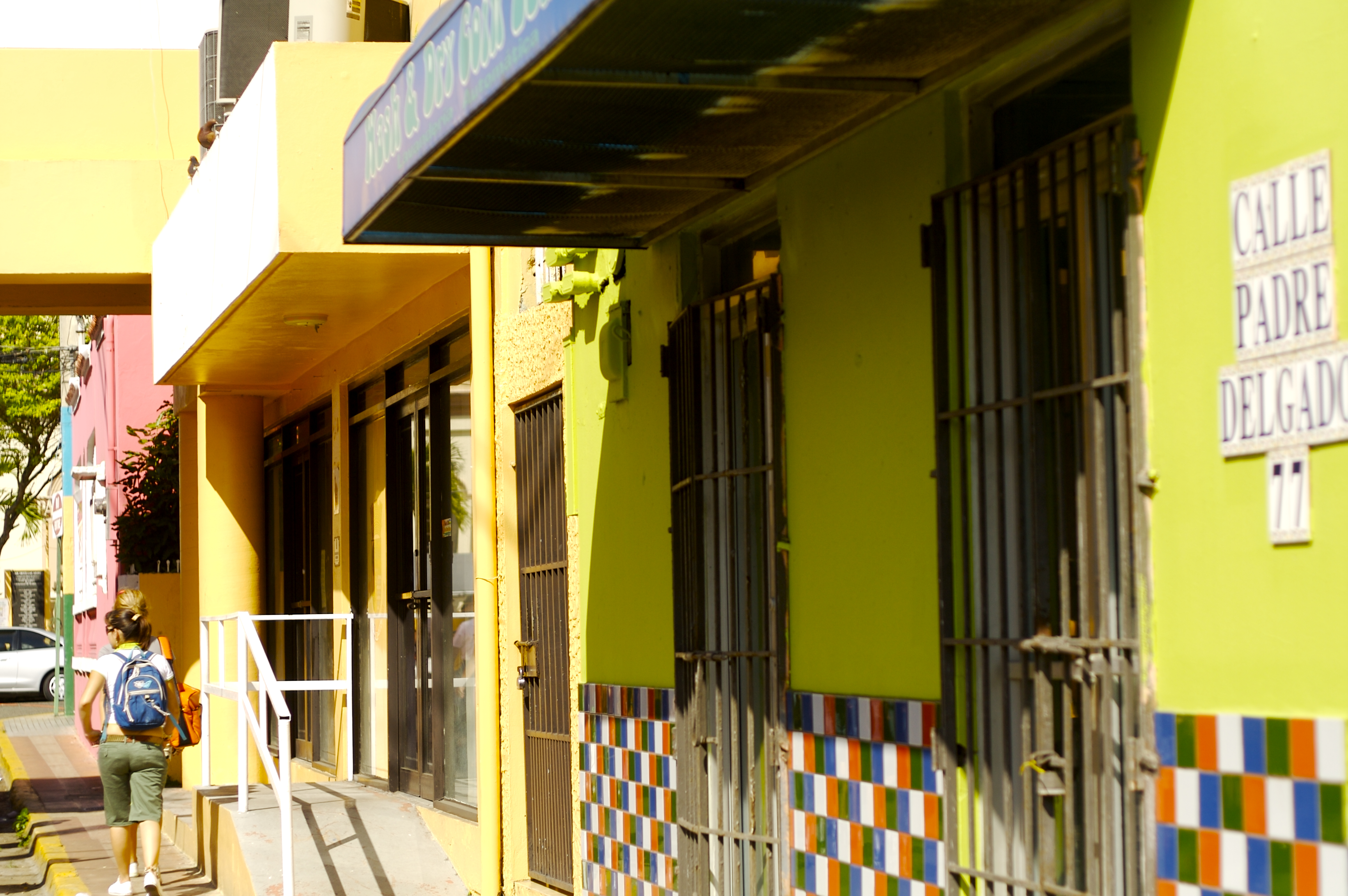
- Calle Padre Delgado in Hatillo barrio-pueblo

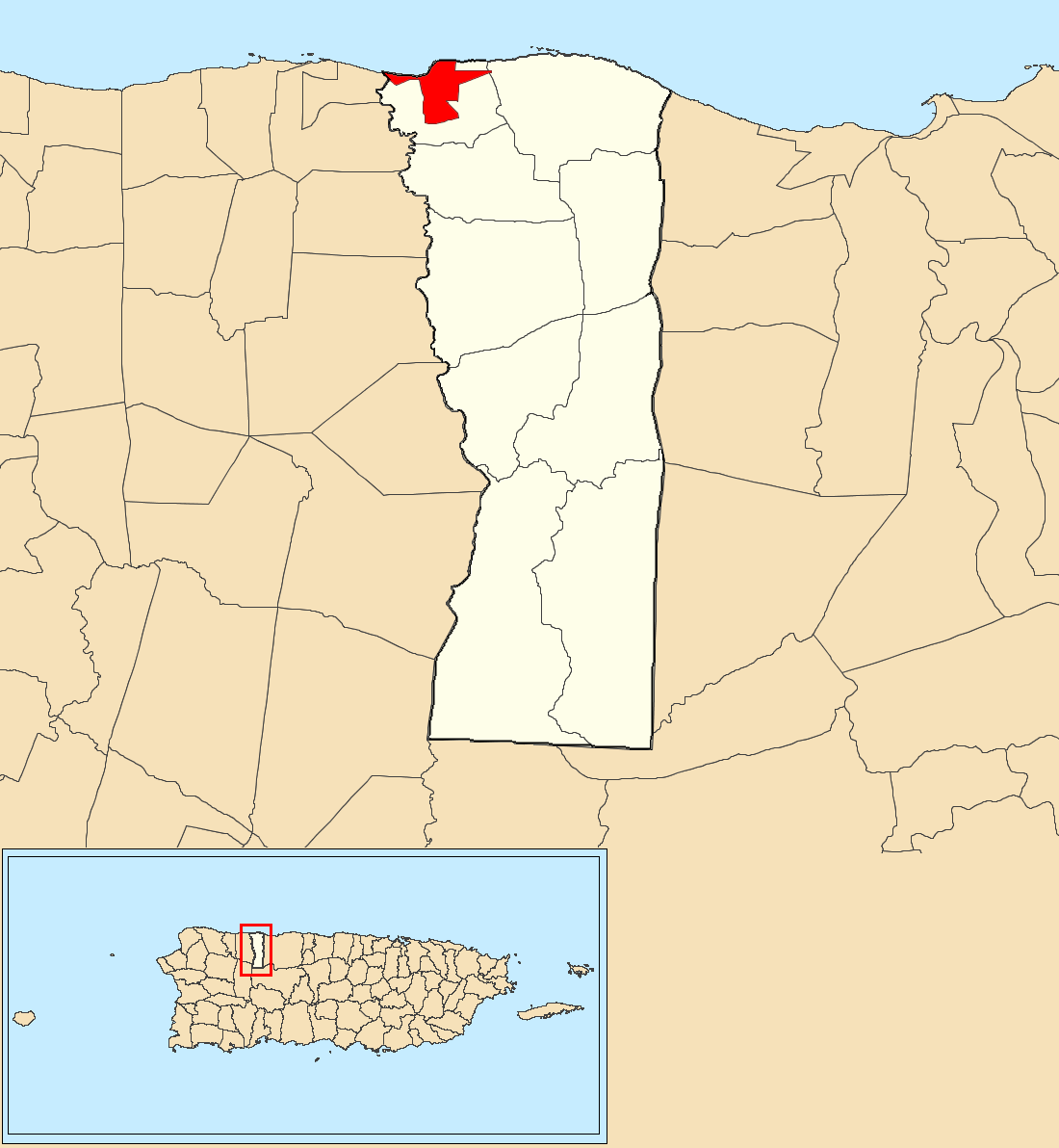
- Location of Hatillo barrio-pueblo within the municipality of Hatillo shown in red

- Location of Puerto Rico
- Coordinates: 18°29′02″N 66°49′30″W
- Commonwealth: Puerto Rico
- Municipality: Hatillo

Area
  - Total: 0.84 sq mi (2.2 km^{2})
  - Land: 0.59 sq mi (1.5 km^{2})
  - Water: 0.25 sq mi (0.65 km^{2})
- Elevation: 10 ft (3.0 m)

Population (2010)
  - Total: 3,117
  - Density: 5,283.1/sq mi (2,039.8/km^{2})
- Source: 2010 Census
- Time zone: UTC−4 (AST)

Hatillo barrio-pueblo is a barrio and the administrative center (seat) of Hatillo, a municipality of Puerto Rico. Its population in 2010 was 3,117.

As was customary in Spain, in Puerto Rico, the municipality has a barrio called pueblo which contains a central plaza, the municipal buildings (city hall), and a Catholic church. Fiestas patronales (patron saint festivals) are held in the central plaza every year.

== The central plaza and its church ==
The central plaza, or square, is a place for official and unofficial recreational events and a place where people can gather and socialize from dawn to dusk. The Laws of the Indies, Spanish law, which regulated life in Puerto Rico in the early 19th century, stated the plaza's purpose was for "the parties" (celebrations, festivities) (Spanish: a propósito para las fiestas), and that the square should be proportionally large enough for the number of neighbors (Spanish: grandeza proporcionada al número de vecinos). These Spanish regulations also stated that the streets nearby should be comfortable portals for passersby, protecting them from the elements: sun and rain.

Located across from the central plaza is the Parroquia Nuestra Señora del Carmen (English: Our Lady of Mount Carmel Parish), a Roman Catholic church. The church was built between 1824 and 1830. It sustained damage during the 1918 San Fermín earthquake. A concrete roof, tower and dome were added in 1930.

== History ==
Hatillo barrio-pueblo was in Spain's gazetteers until Puerto Rico was ceded by Spain in the aftermath of the Spanish–American War under the terms of the Treaty of Paris of 1898 and became an unincorporated territory of the United States. In 1899, the United States Department of War conducted a census of Puerto Rico finding that the population of Hatillo barrio-pueblo was 669.

Historical population
Census	Pop.	Note	%±
1900	669		—
1910	1,338		100.0%
1920	1,674		25.1%
1930	2,250		34.4%
1940	1,533		−31.9%
1950	2,482		61.9%
1960	2,582		4.0%
1970	0		−100.0%
1980	3,060		—
1990	2,862		−6.5%
2000	2,757		−3.7%
2010	3,117		13.1%
U.S. Decennial Census; 1899 (shown as 1900) 1910-1930; 1930-1950 1980-2000 2010

== Gallery ==
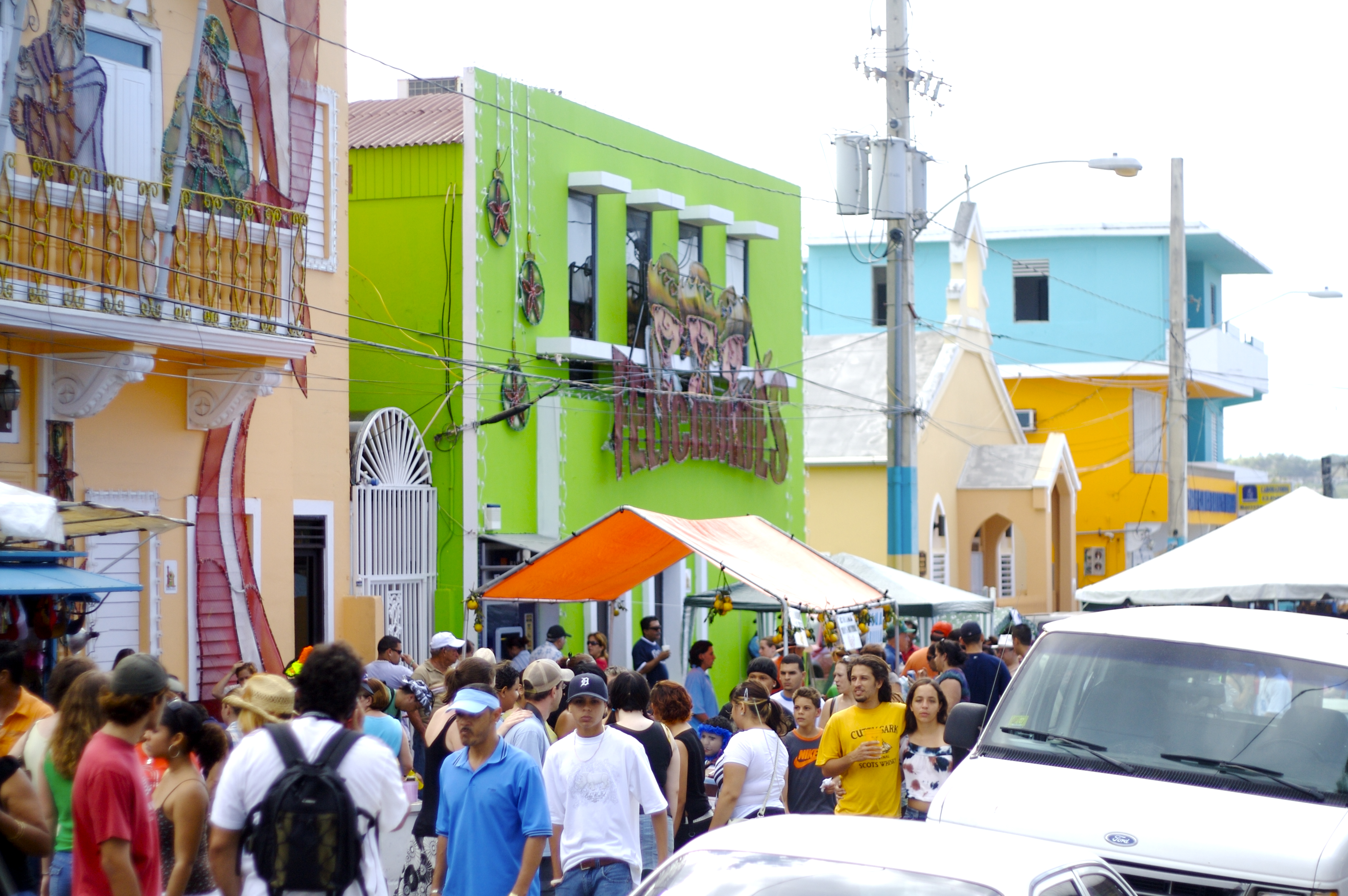
The annual Festival de las Mascaras

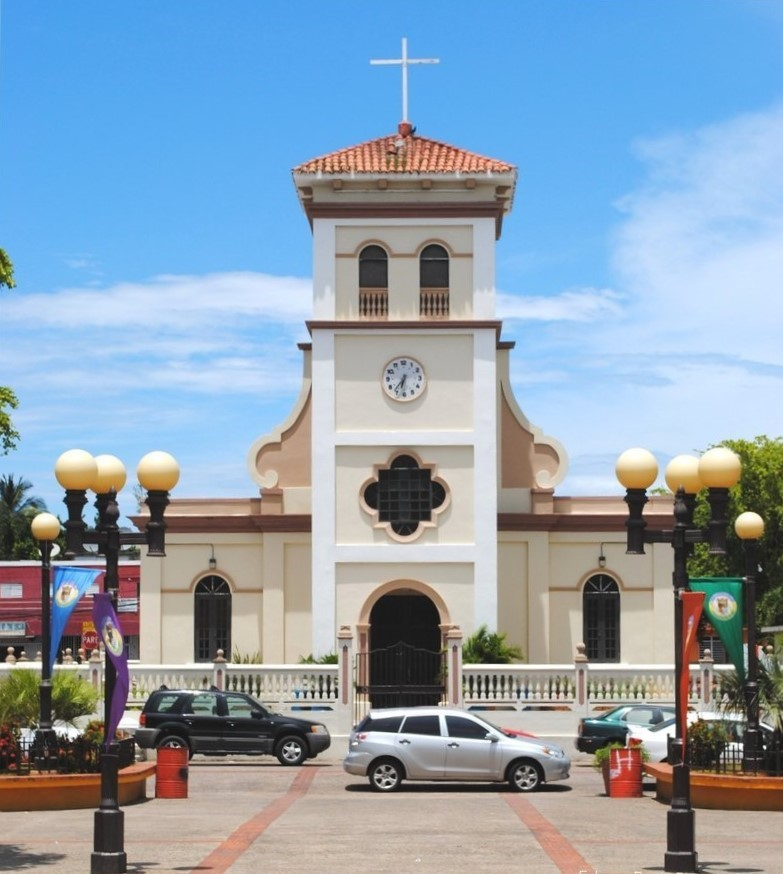
Parroquia Nuestra Señora del Carmen

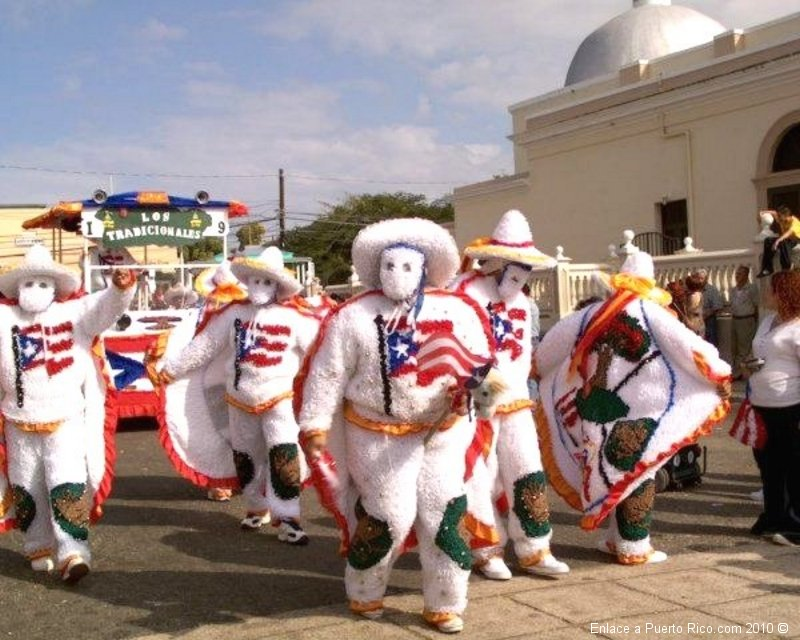
Festival de Mascaras de Hatillo

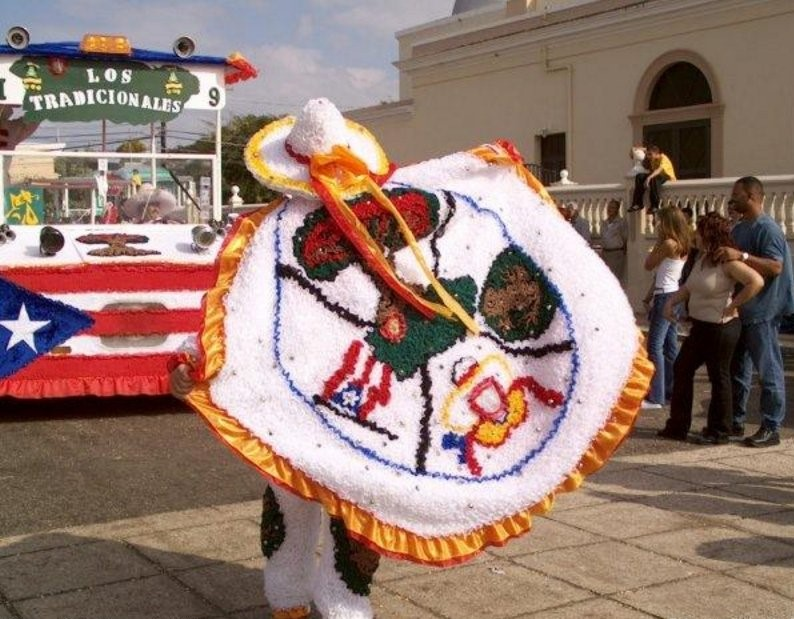
Festival de Mascaras de Hatillo

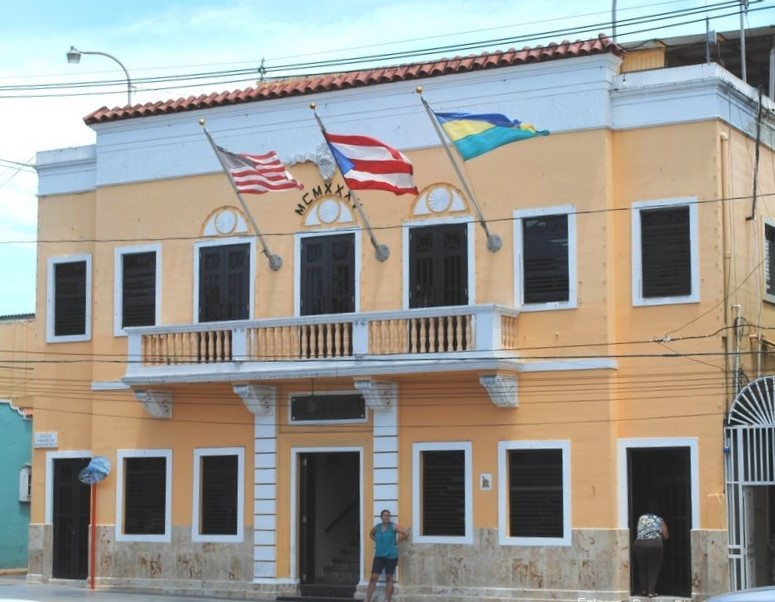
Town Hall

== See also ==
- List of communities in Puerto Rico
