= Aibonito, Hatillo, Puerto Rico =

Barrio of Puerto Rico

Aibonito
- Barrio
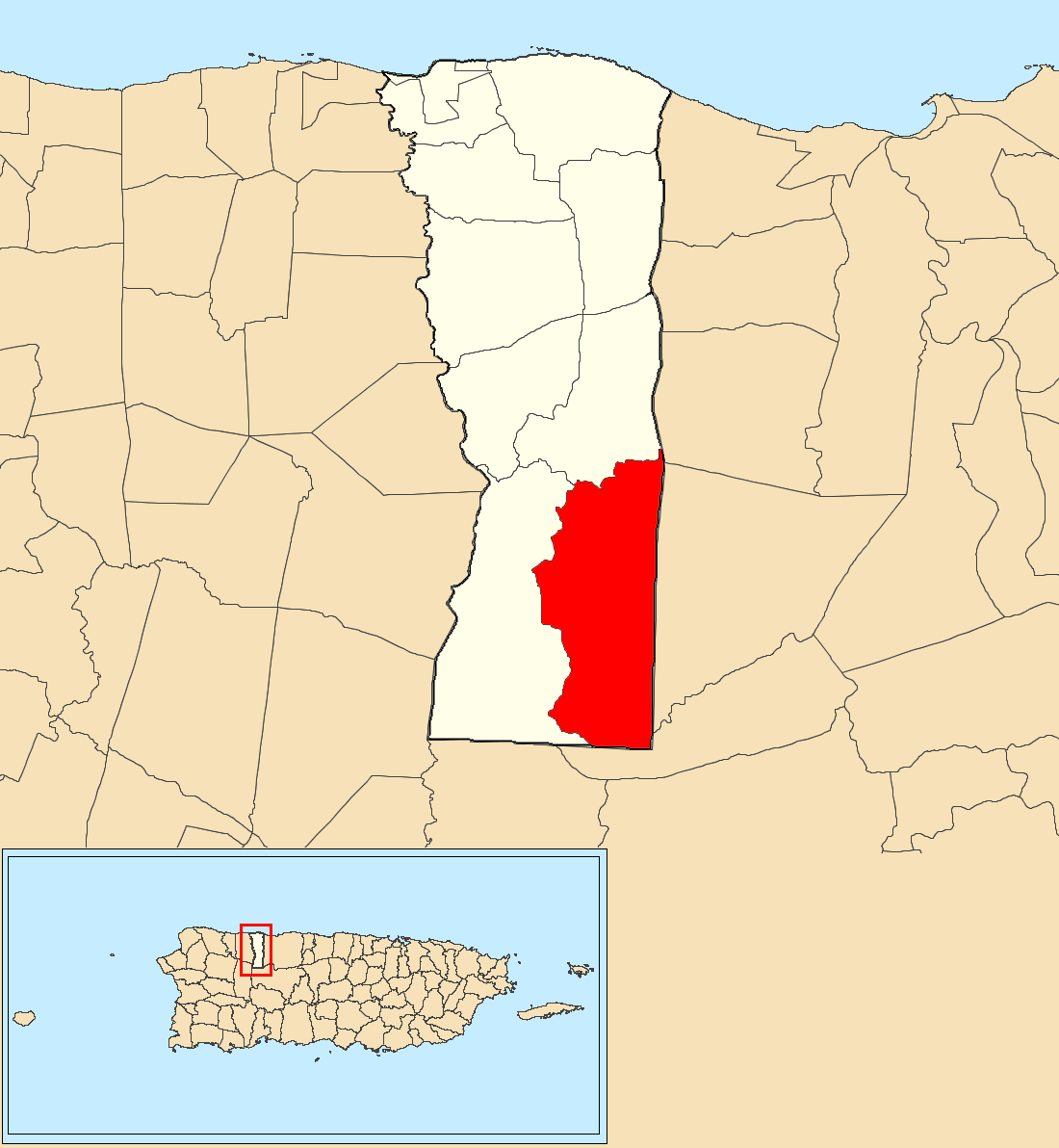
- Location of Aibonito within the municipality of Hatillo shown in red

- Location of Puerto Rico
- Coordinates: 18°20′57″N 66°46′31″W
- Commonwealth: Puerto Rico
- Municipality: Hatillo

Area
  - Total: 7.56 sq mi (19.6 km^{2})
  - Land: 7.56 sq mi (19.6 km^{2})
  - Water: 0 sq mi (0 km^{2})
- Elevation: 965 ft (294 m)

Population (2010)
  - Total: 2,816
- Source: 2010 Census
- Time zone: UTC−4 (AST)

Aibonito is a rural barrio in the municipality of Hatillo, Puerto Rico. Its population in 2010 was 2,816.

Historical population
Census	Pop.	Note	%±
1900	1,606		—
1910	1,680		4.6%
1920	2,291		36.4%
1930	2,520		10.0%
1940	2,955		17.3%
1950	2,635		−10.8%
1960	2,736		3.8%
1970	2,939		7.4%
1980	2,949		0.3%
1990	2,655		−10.0%
2000	2,705		1.9%
2010	2,816		4.1%
U.S. Decennial Census; 1899 (shown as 1900) 1910-1930; 1930-1950 1980-2000 2010

== History ==
Aibonito was in Spain's gazetteers until Puerto Rico was ceded by Spain in the aftermath of the Spanish–American War under the terms of the Treaty of Paris of 1898 and became an unincorporated territory of the United States. In 1899, the United States Department of War conducted a census of Puerto Rico finding that the population of Aibonito barrio was 1,606.

== See also ==
- List of communities in Puerto Rico
