= Piedras River (Utuado, Puerto Rico) =

River of Puerto Rico

Coordinates: 18.2780087°N 66.8301760°W

Location
- Commonwealth: Puerto Rico
- Municipality: Utuado

The Piedras River (Spanish: Río Piedras) is a river of Puerto Rico in the municipality of Utuado. This is one of many rivers with this name in Puerto Rico.

== See also ==
- List of rivers of Puerto Rico
