= Hatillo, Hatillo, Puerto Rico =

Barrio of Puerto Rico

Hatillo
- Barrio
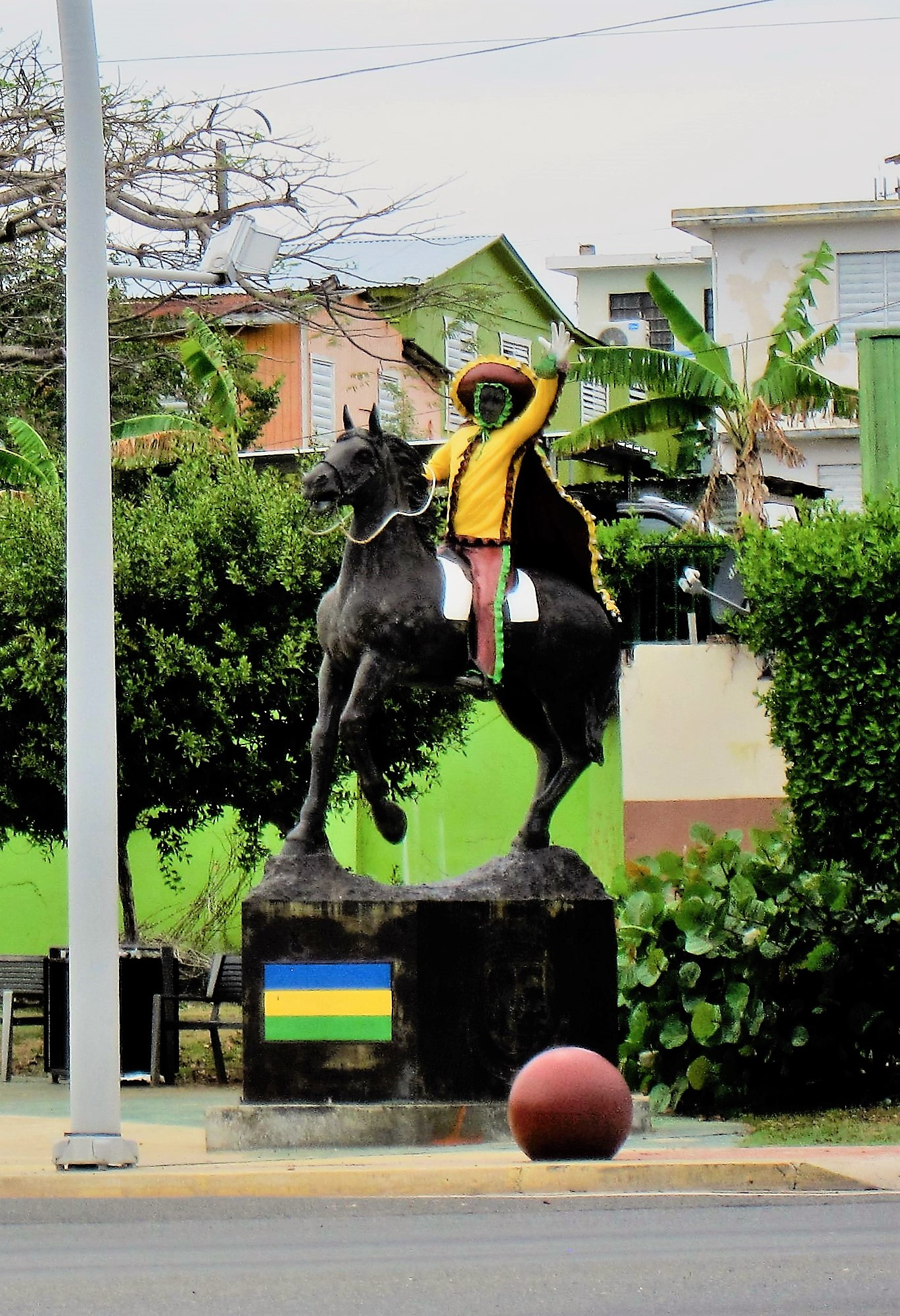
- Horse with festival-goer statue in Hatillo barrio

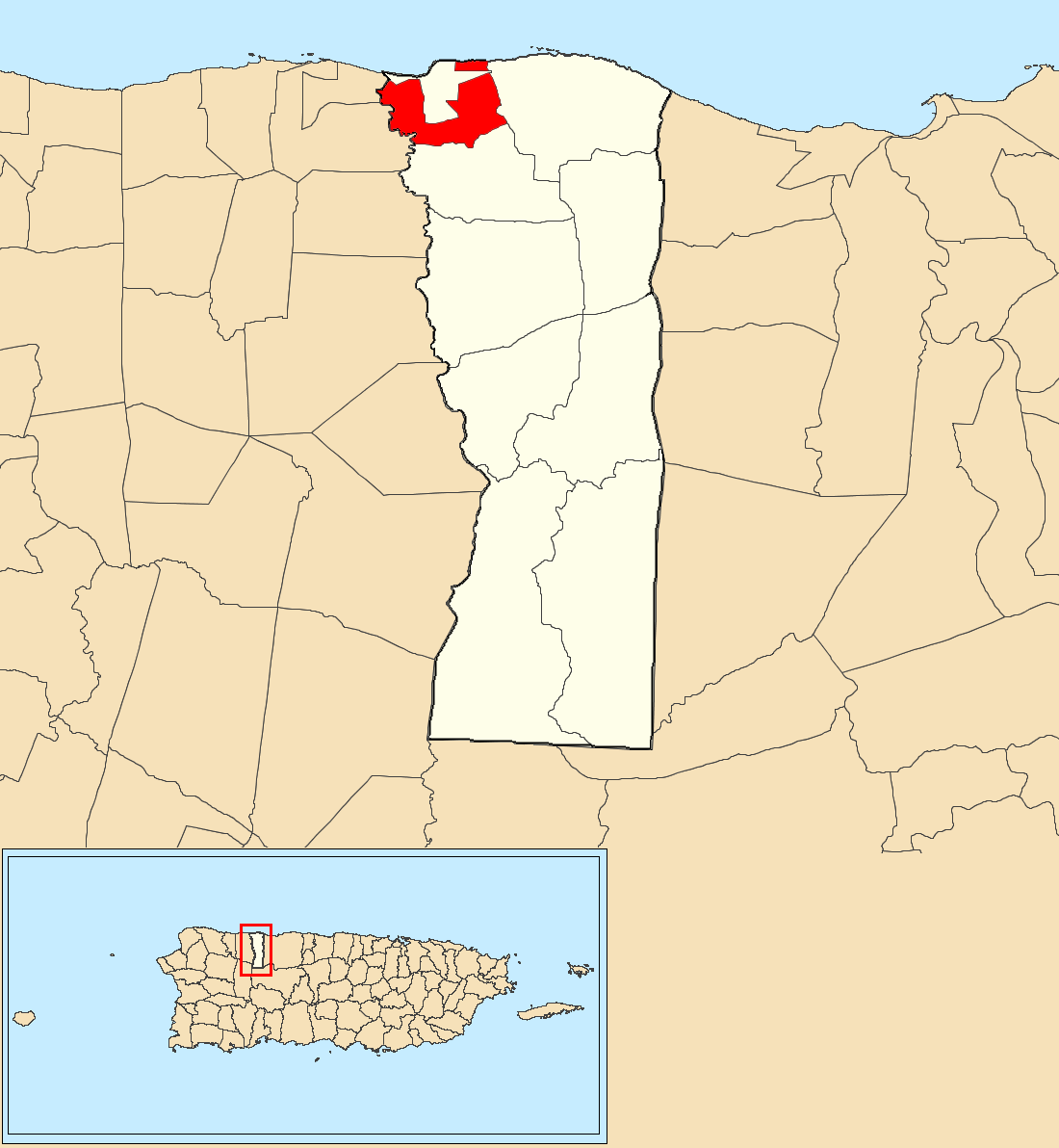
- Location of Hatillo within the municipality of Hatillo shown in red

- Location of Puerto Rico
- Coordinates: 18°28′43″N 66°49′03″W
- Commonwealth: Puerto Rico
- Municipality: Hatillo

Area
  - Total: 1.81 sq mi (4.7 km^{2})
  - Land: 1.60 sq mi (4.1 km^{2})
  - Water: 0.21 sq mi (0.54 km^{2})
- Elevation: 52 ft (16 m)

Population (2010)
  - Total: 3,806
  - Density: 2,393.7/sq mi (924.2/km^{2})
- Source: 2010 Census
- Time zone: UTC−4 (AST)

Hatillo is a barrio in the municipality of Hatillo, Puerto Rico. Its population in 2010 was 3,806.

== History ==
Hatillo was in Spain's gazetteers until Puerto Rico was ceded by Spain in the aftermath of the Spanish–American War under the terms of the Treaty of Paris of 1898 and became an unincorporated territory of the United States. In 1899, the United States Department of War conducted a census of Puerto Rico finding that the population of Hatillo barrio was 676.

Historical population
Census	Pop.	Note	%±
1900	676		—
1910	739		9.3%
1920	950		28.6%
1940	1,243		—
1950	1,041		−16.3%
1960	1,278		22.8%
1970	0		−100.0%
1980	2,700		—
1990	3,296		22.1%
2000	4,210		27.7%
2010	3,806		−9.6%
U.S. Decennial Census; 1899 (shown as 1900) 1910-1930; 1930-1950 1980-2000 2010

== Sectors ==
Barrios (which are, in contemporary times, roughly comparable to minor civil divisions) in turn are further subdivided into smaller local populated place areas/units called sectores (sectors in English). The types of sectores may vary, from normally sector to urbanización to reparto to barriada to residencial, among others.

== Gallery ==
Scenes in and around Hatillo, Hatillo:

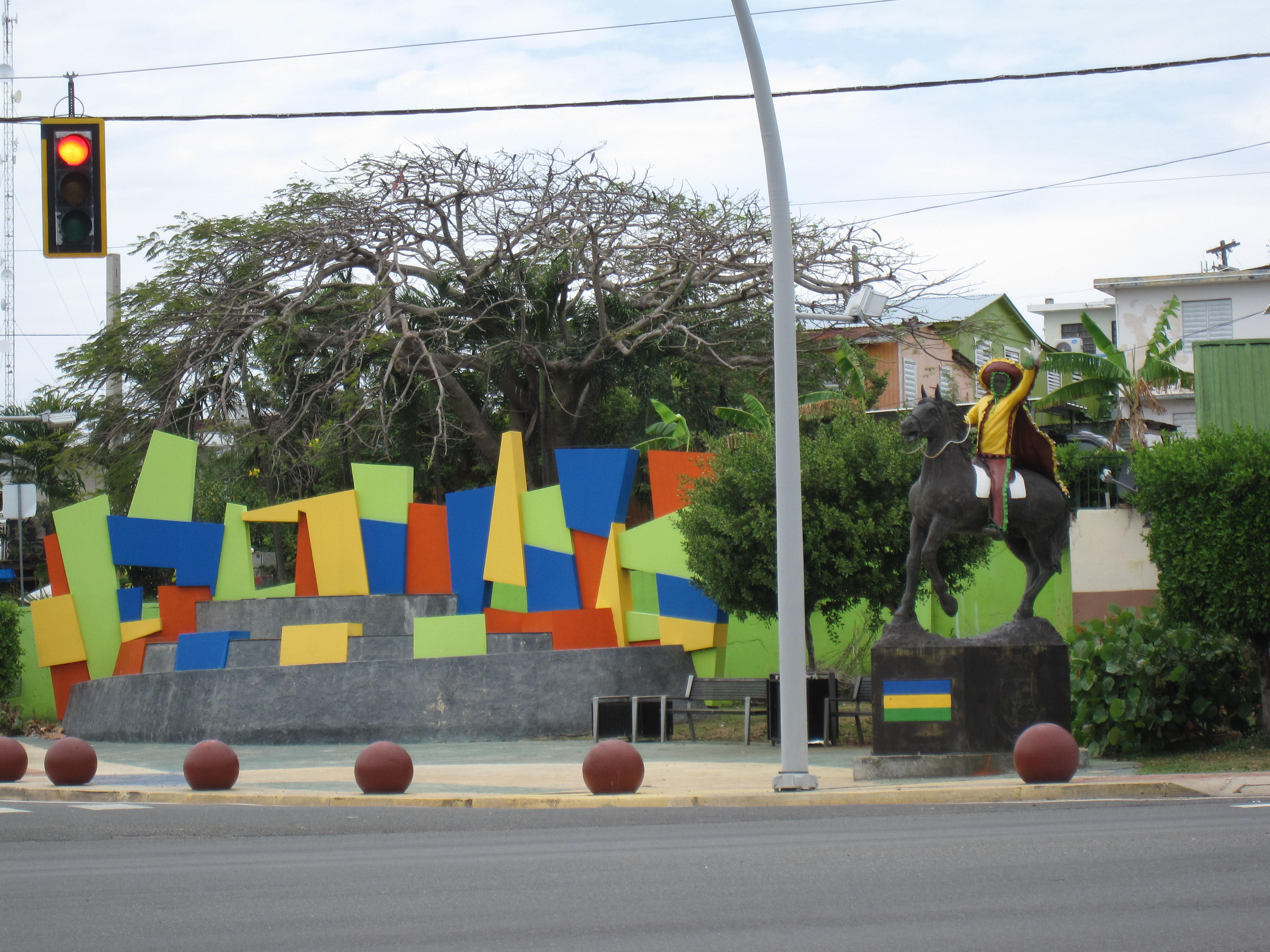
On PR-130 and PR-2

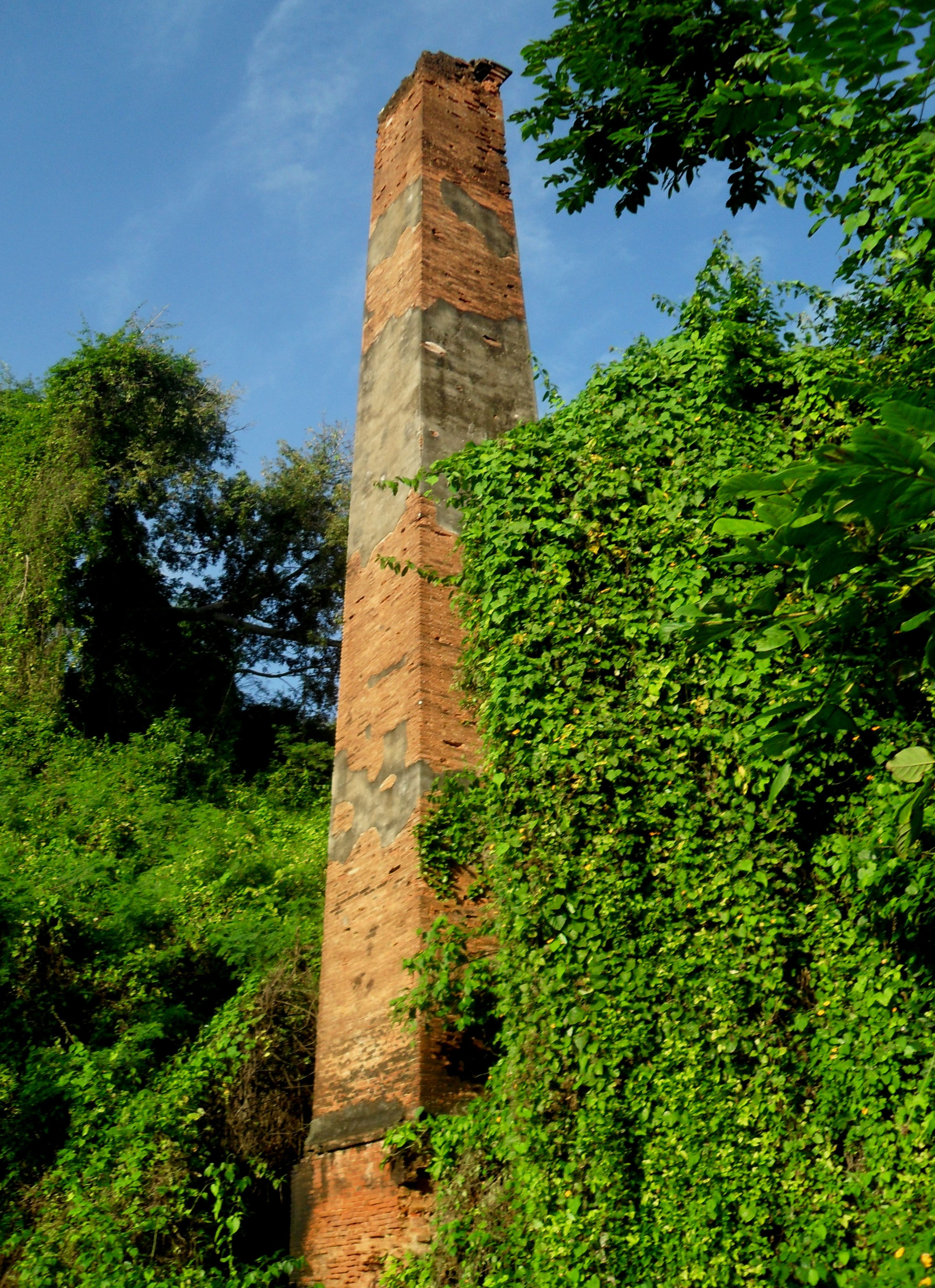
Old smoke stack, a little distance from Santa Rosa in Hatillo

== See also ==
- List of communities in Puerto Rico
