= Hatillo, Puerto Rico =

City and municipality in Puerto Rico

Hatillo Municipio de Hatillo
- Town and Municipality
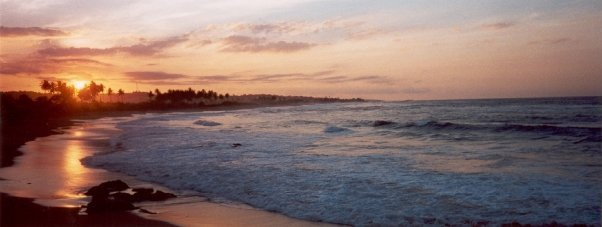
- Sunset over La Marina in Hatillo

- Flag Coat of arms
- Nicknames: "El Pueblo sin Sopa", "Capital De La Industria Lechera"' "Hatillo Del Corazón De Riego", "Tierra de Campos Verdes", "Los Ganaderos"
- Anthem: "De un mar azul en el Atlántico"
- Map of Puerto Rico highlighting Hatillo Municipality
- Coordinates: 18°29′11″N 66°49′32″W
- Sovereign state: United States
- Commonwealth: Puerto Rico
- Founded: June 30, 1823
- Founder: Agustín Ruiz Miranda
- Barrios: 10 barrios: Aibonito; Bayaney; Buena Vista; Campo Alegre; Capáez; Carrizales; Corcovado; Hatillo; Hatillo barrio-pueblo; Naranjito

Government
  - Mayor: Carlos E. Román Román (PPD)
  - Senatorial dist.: 3 - Arecibo
  - Representative dist.: 15

Area
  - Total: 58.73 sq mi (152.10 km^{2})
  - Land: 41.78 sq mi (108.22 km^{2})
  - Water: 16.94 sq mi (43.88 km^{2})

Population (2020)
  - Total: 38,481
  - Estimate (2025): 37,810 ▼
  - Rank: 25th in Puerto Rico
  - Density: 920.95/sq mi (355.58/km^{2})
- Demonym: Hatillanos
- Time zone: UTC-4 (AST)
- ZIP Code: 00659
- Area code: 787/939

Hatillo (Spanish pronunciation: [aˈtiʝo]) is a town and municipality located in Puerto Rico's north coast, bordered by the Atlantic Ocean to the north, Lares and Utuado to the south, Camuy to the west, and Arecibo to the east. According to the 2000 Census, Hatillo is spread over nine barrios and Hatillo Pueblo (the downtown area and the administrative center of the city).

== History ==
Agustín Ruiz Miranda, a Canarian immigrant, founded Hatillo on approximately ten cuerdas (a cuerda is 0.97 acre, also called a Spanish acre) in 1823. Miranda granted this land on the condition that public buildings be erected and wide streets be built, and that the remaining land be sold or used for homes.

In its first year, Hatillo had 910 people; increasing to 2,663 inhabitants the following year distributed among the central town and the barrios of Carrizales, Capáez, Naranjito, Corcovado, Buena Vista (formerly Yeguada Occidental), Campo Alegre (formerly Yeguada Oriental), Pajuil, Bayaney, Aibonito, and the Pueblo. Barrio Pajuil had disappeared by the 1940 census being divided up between Buena Vista, Naranjito, Corcovado and Campo Alegre barrios. There were also two sugarcane plantations named "Hacienda Santa Rosa" measuring 150 cuerdas and "Hacienda Perseverancia" at 50 cuerdas.

Puerto Rico was ceded by Spain in the aftermath of the Spanish–American War under the terms of the Treaty of Paris of 1898 and became a territory of the United States. In 1899, the United States Department of War conducted a census of Puerto Rico finding that the population of Hatillo was 1,148.

Hatillo, like several other municipalities on the island, experienced boundary changes from the 1902 municipality consolidation law (Consolidación de Ciertos Términos Municipales de Puerto Rico) in which Hatillo was annexed temporarily into neighboring Camuy. Three years later the territorial legislature approved the reformation of Hatillo as a separate municipality (independent town) from Camuy in 1905. In 1910, Barrio Pueblo (rural) changed its name to Hatillo barrio (rural). In 1930, Yeguadilla Occidental and Yeguadilla Oriental barrios' names were changed to Buena Vista and Campo Alegre, respectively. As mentioned before, Pajuil barrio disappeared by the 1940 census being divided up between barrios Buena Vista, Naranjito, Corcovado and Campo Alegre. In 1947 the Planning Commission of Puerto Rico issued a new map of Hatillo municipality and its barrios. As a result of this new map, the central town was expanded to include part of Hatillo barrio (rural) and the name of "Corcovados" was changed to "Corcovado".

On September 20, 2017 Hurricane Maria struck Puerto Rico. In Hatillo, residences and municipal buildings sustained damage. The 75 dairy farms which produce much of the milk consumed in Puerto Rico were greatly affected. Ranchers said milk production would decrease by up to 45% in 2017. The hurricane triggered numerous landslides in Hatillo.

== Geography ==
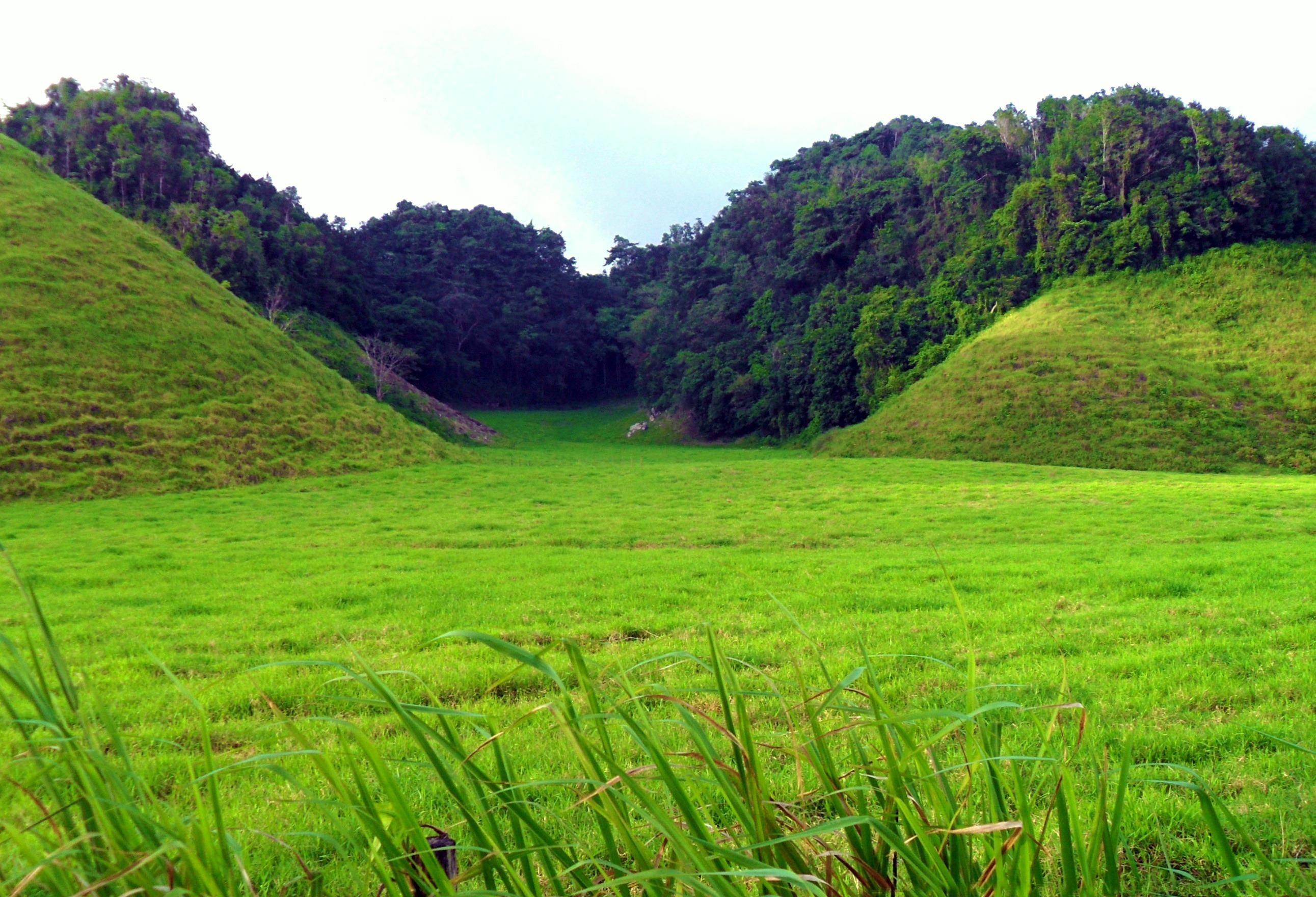
Mogotes on border of Hatillo and Sector Hess in Esperanza, Arecibo

Hatillo is a coastal town on the northern side of Puerto Rico, on the Northern Karst region. There are 9 bridges in Hatillo.

=== Barrios ===
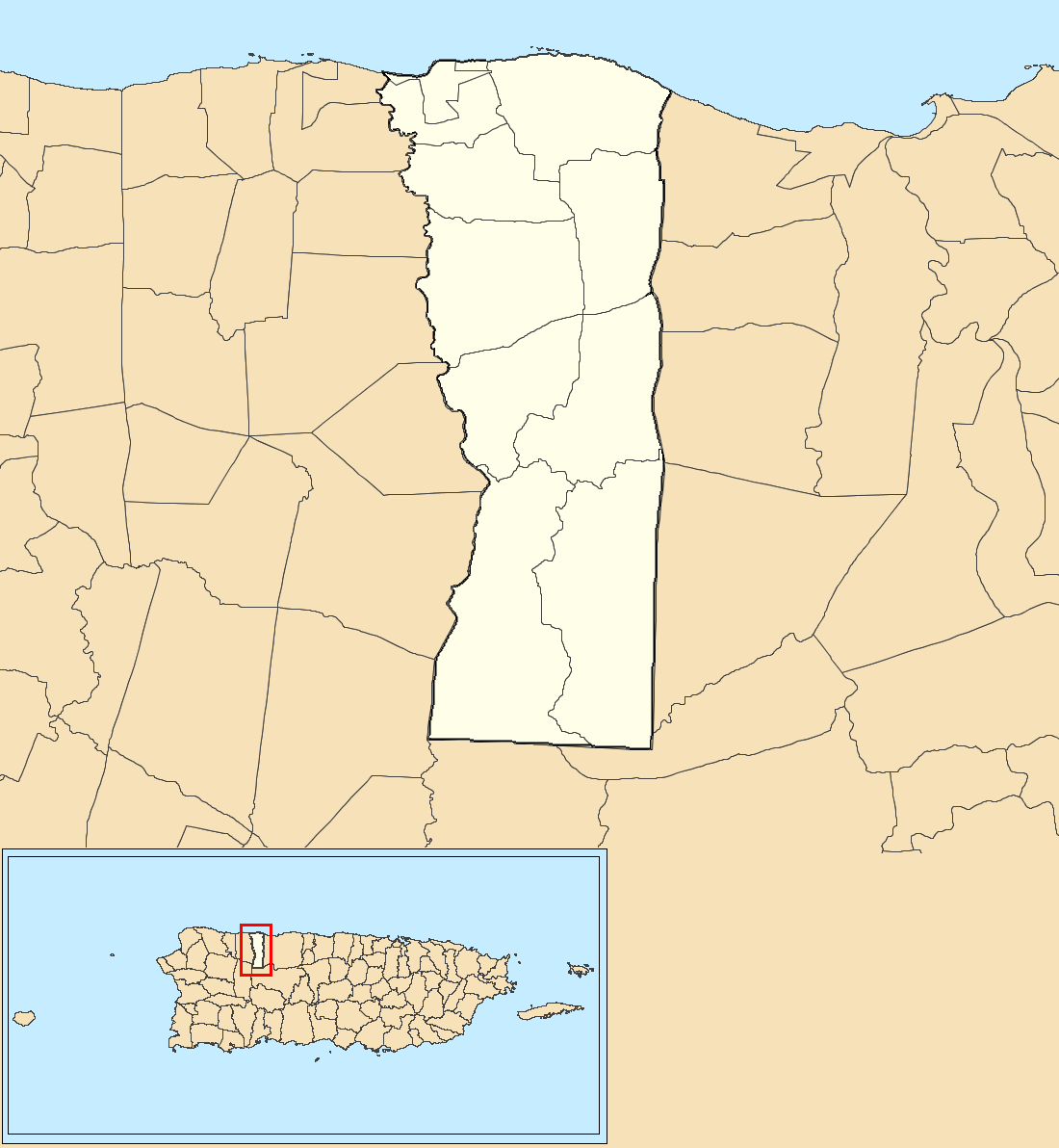
Subdivisions of Hatillo

Like all municipalities of Puerto Rico, Hatillo is subdivided into barrios. The municipal buildings, central square and large Catholic church are located in a small barrio referred to as "el pueblo".

1. Aibonito
2. Bayaney
3. Buena Vista
4. Campo Alegre
5. Capáez
6. Carrizales
7. Corcovado
8. Hatillo
9. Hatillo barrio-pueblo
10. Naranjito

"Sound of coquí in Hatillo"
Shared by El Cloquido

=== Sectors ===
Barrios (which are, in contemporary times, roughly comparable to minor civil divisions) and subbarrios, are further subdivided into smaller areas called sectores (sectors in English). The types of sectores may vary, from normally sector to urbanización to reparto to barriada to residencial, among others.

=== Special Communities ===
Comunidades Especiales de Puerto Rico (Special Communities of Puerto Rico) are marginalized communities whose citizens are experiencing a certain amount of social exclusion. A map shows these communities occur in nearly every municipality of the commonwealth. Of the 742 places that were on the list in 2014, the following barrios, communities, sectors, or neighborhoods were in Hatillo: Altos de Fuego, Clan neighborhood, Aibonito, Naranjito, Bayaney, and Buena Vista.

== Tourism ==
To stimulate local tourism, the Puerto Rico Tourism Company launched the Voy Turistiendo ("I'm Touring") campaign, with a passport book and website. The Hatillo page lists El Gran Parque del Norte, Hatillo Novalac, and Quesos Vaca Negra, as places of interest.

=== Landmarks and places of interest ===
According to a news article by Primera Hora, there are 10 beaches in Hatillo. Other places of interest in Hatillo include:

- Antigua Central Bayaney
- Francisco "Pancho" Deida Méndez Coliseum
- Hacienda Santa Rosa Ruins
- Iglesia de Nuestra Señora del Carmen
- José Antonio Monrouzeau Theater
- Juan Carmelo "Tito" Rodríguez Donate Stadium
- La Marina Beach
- Los Ilustres Park
- Paseo del Carmen
- Plaza del Norte Mall
- Sardinera Beach
- Trapiche de Santa Rosa
- Virgen del Carmen Parish

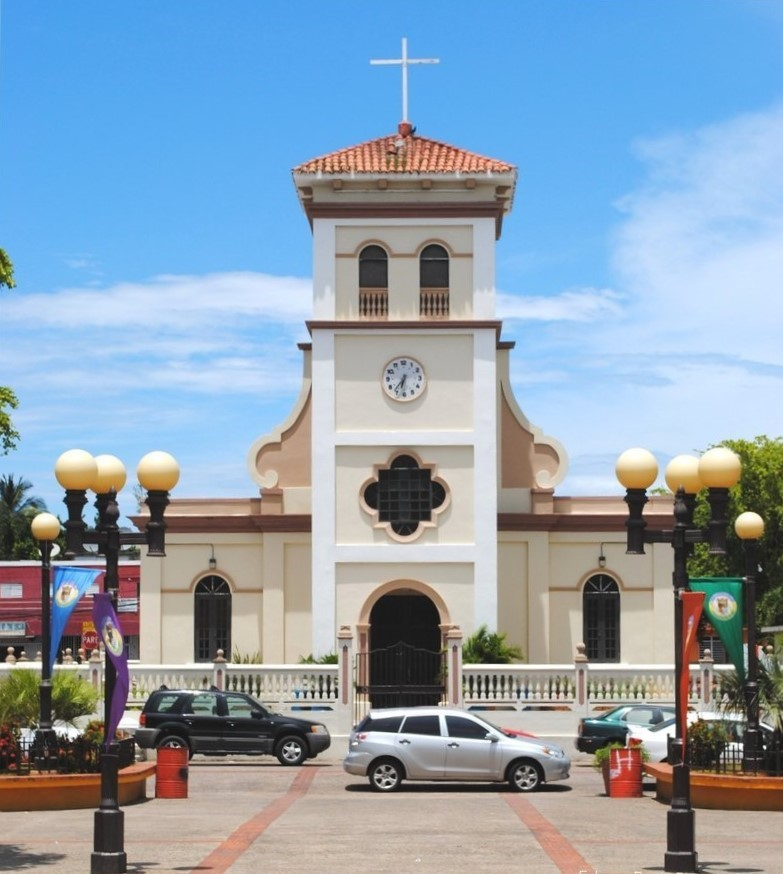
Iglesia de Nuestra Señora del Carmen

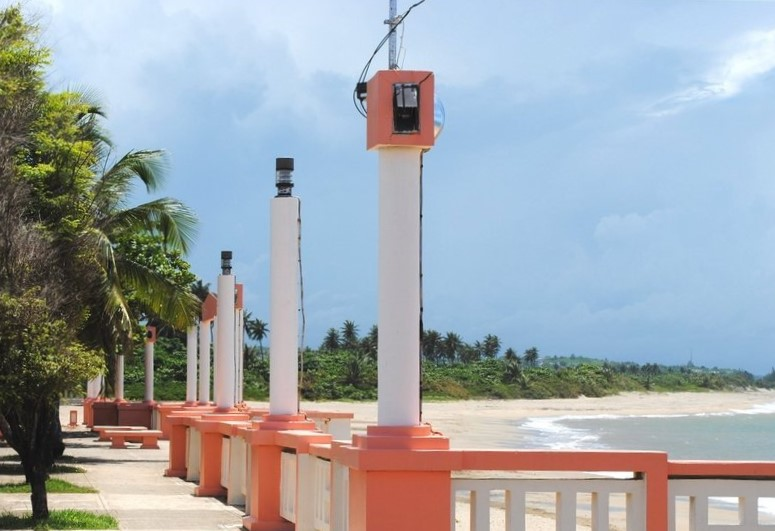
Paseo del Carmen

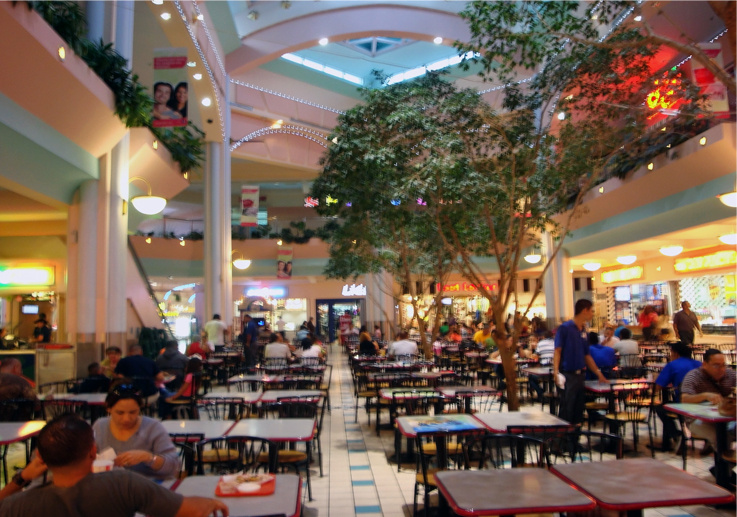
Plaza del Norte Mall

== Economy ==
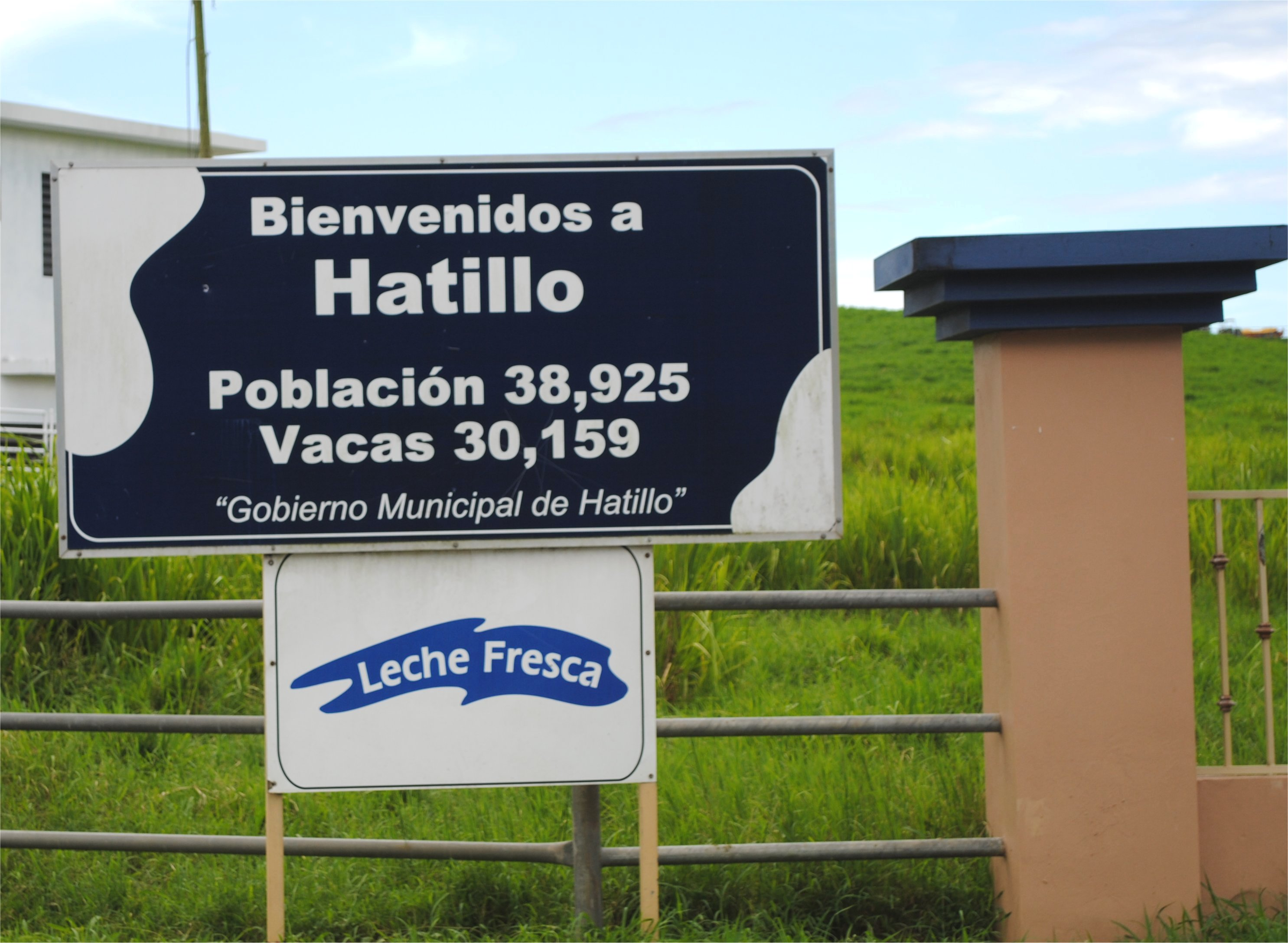
Hatillo, Puerto Rico human and cow population in 2010 sign

=== Agriculture ===
Today, Hatillo is the major producer of milk on the island and produces a third of the milk consumed in Puerto Rico.

=== Business ===
Plaza del Norte is a shopping mall located in the barrio of Carrizales.

== Demographics ==
Historical population
Census	Pop.	Note	%±
1900	10,449		—
1910	10,630		1.7%
1920	13,979		31.5%
1930	16,168		15.7%
1940	18,322		13.3%
1950	20,877		13.9%
1960	20,238		−3.1%
1970	21,913		8.3%
1980	28,958		32.1%
1990	32,703		12.9%
2000	38,925		19.0%
2010	41,953		7.8%
2020	38,481		−8.3%
2025 (est.)	37,810	▼	−1.7%
U.S. Decennial Census; 1899 (shown as 1900) 1910-1930; 1930-1950 1960-2000 2010 2020

== Culture ==
=== Festivals and events ===
Hatillo celebrates its patron saint festival in July. The Fiestas Patronales de Nuestra Señora del Carmen is a religious and cultural celebration that generally features parades, games, artisans, amusement rides, regional food, and live entertainment. The festival has featured live performances by well-known artists such as Sonora Ponceña, Andy Montañez, Pedro Capó, Sie7e and El Gran Combo de Puerto Rico.

Other festivals and events celebrated in Hatillo include:

- Fiestas de la Cruz - May
- Festival de la Herencia Canaria - May
- Hatillo Music And Culinary Fest - May
- Festival de la Caña de Azucar- May
- Festival de la Leche Fresca - June
- Hatillo es Bomba y Plena - October
- Cooperative Movement Traditional festival- October
- Festival de las Máscaras (Mask Festival)- December
- Christmas festival - December

The Mask Festival began in 1823, and was imported by the immigrants from the Canary Islands, where the traditional festival originated. The early tradition of the festival required that the male population dress as women and they would visit each residence where the owners would offer them food and drinks. Currently the festival is celebrated every year on December 28. The Masks are fashioned and based on the biblical story of King Herod (Herod the Great). The costumes used are very elaborate and the Masks represent the soldiers which were sent by the King Herod to kill all boys age three and younger, after hearing about a new king being born as told by the Three Wise Men. The festival, however is presented in humor and said soldiers only joke around and ride on chariots.

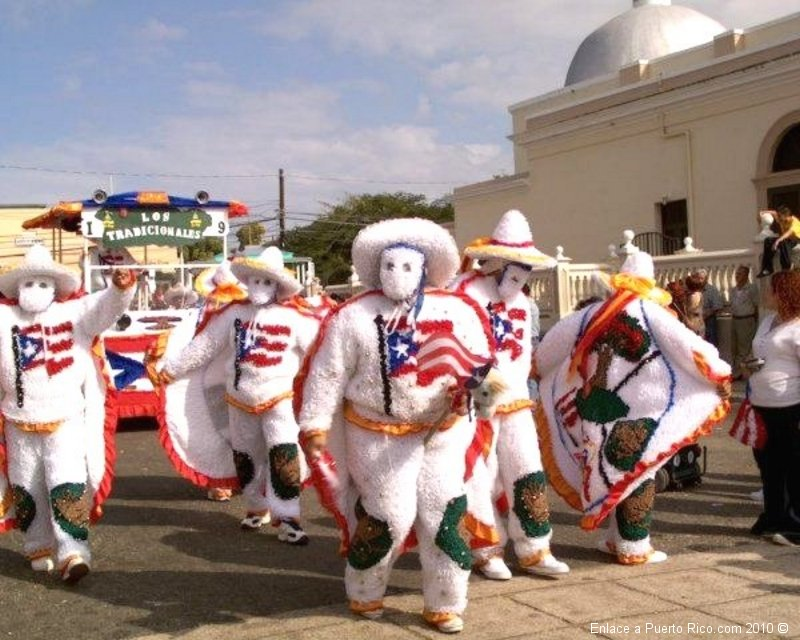

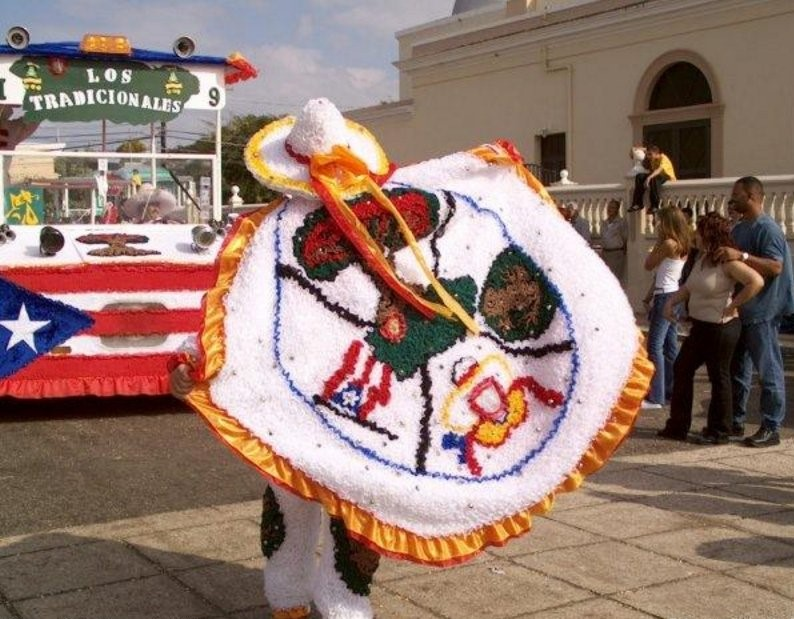

== Symbols ==
The municipio has an official flag and coat of arms.

=== Flag ===
The flag consists of three broad stripes - Blue, Yellow and Green. Blue represents the sea, yellow represents the material and artistic wealth of the town, and green represents the vegetation of its fields in all its territorial extension.

=== Coat of arms ===
On top of the shield is a gold crown with three towers over a silver field a Custard apple tree (Annona reticulata) and a field with two cows in gold which is over eight blue and silver-plated waves. At the center is a shield of "La Orden del Carmen". Under the shield the motto is inscribed, Hatillo Del Corazón.

== Gallery ==
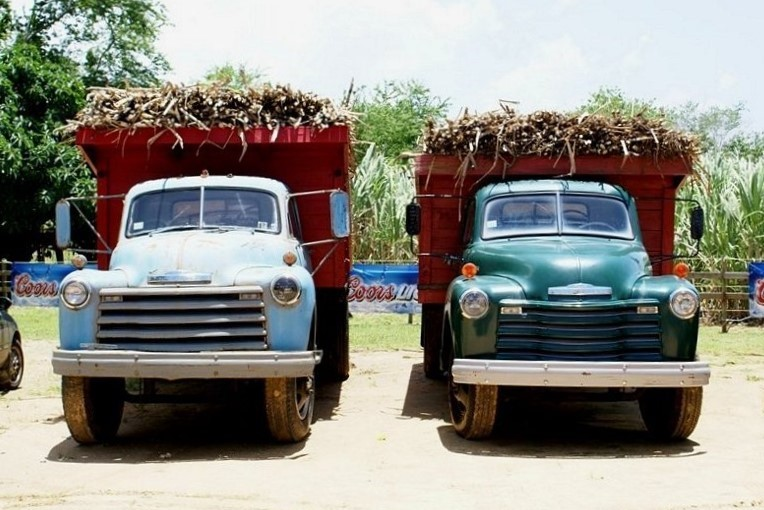
Festival de la Caña, Hatillo

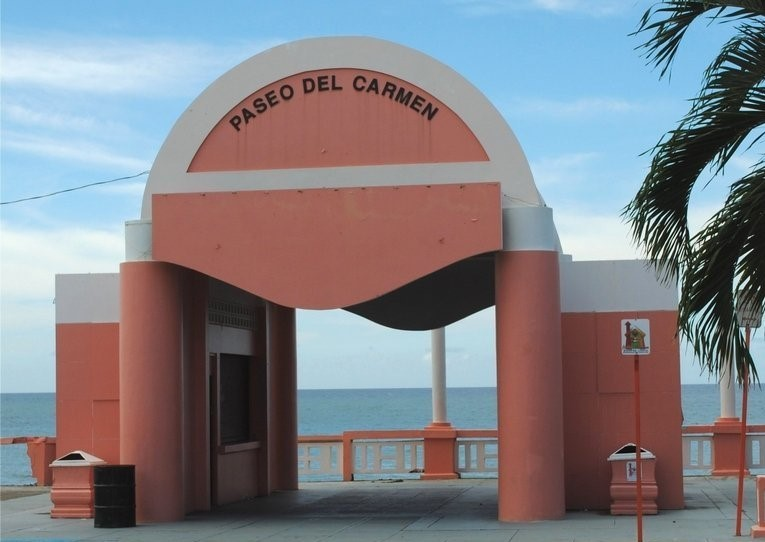
Paseo del Carmen

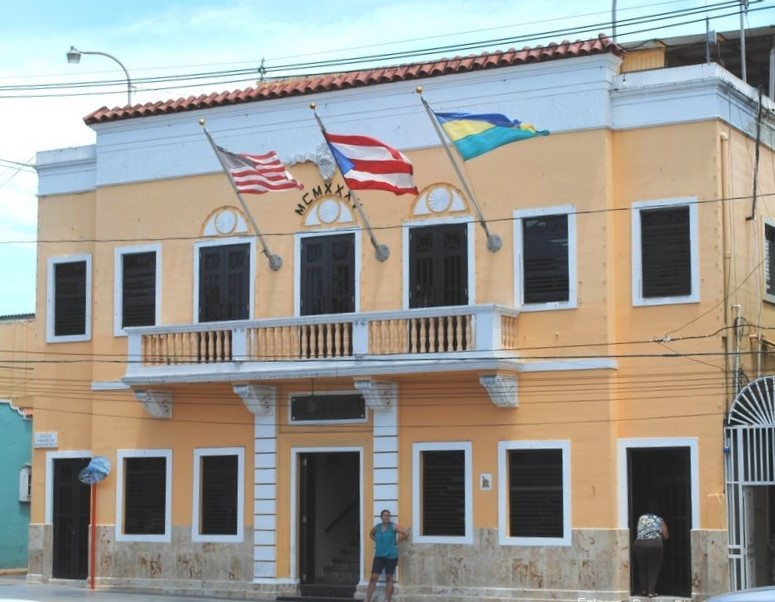
Town Hall of Hatillo

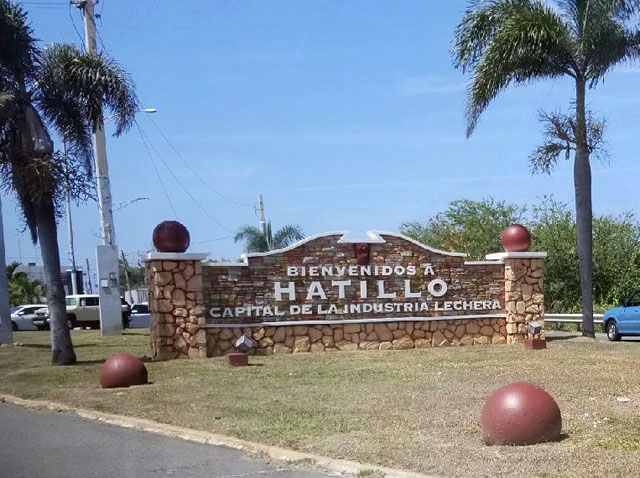
Welcome rock wall

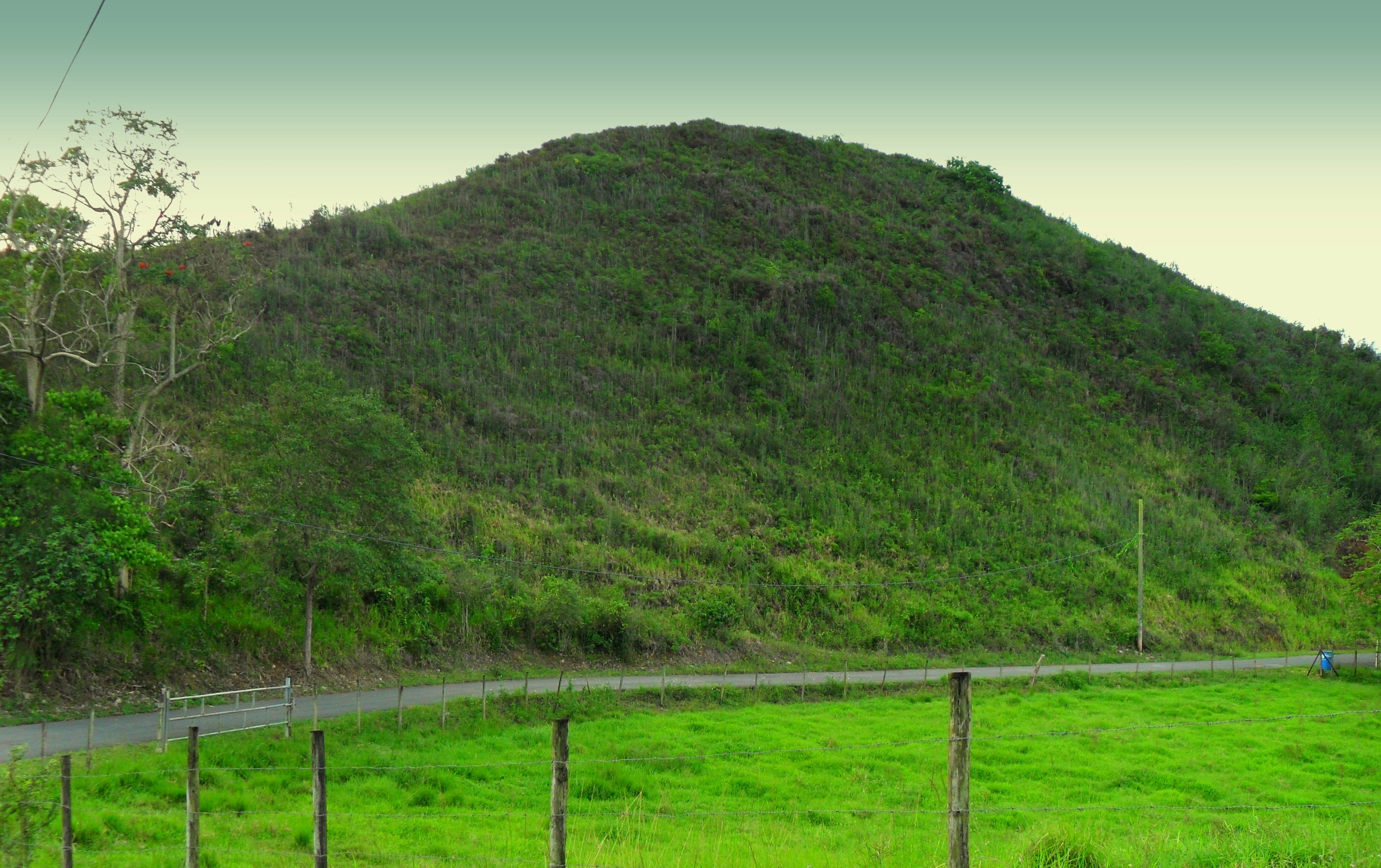
Mogote on a road in Hatillo

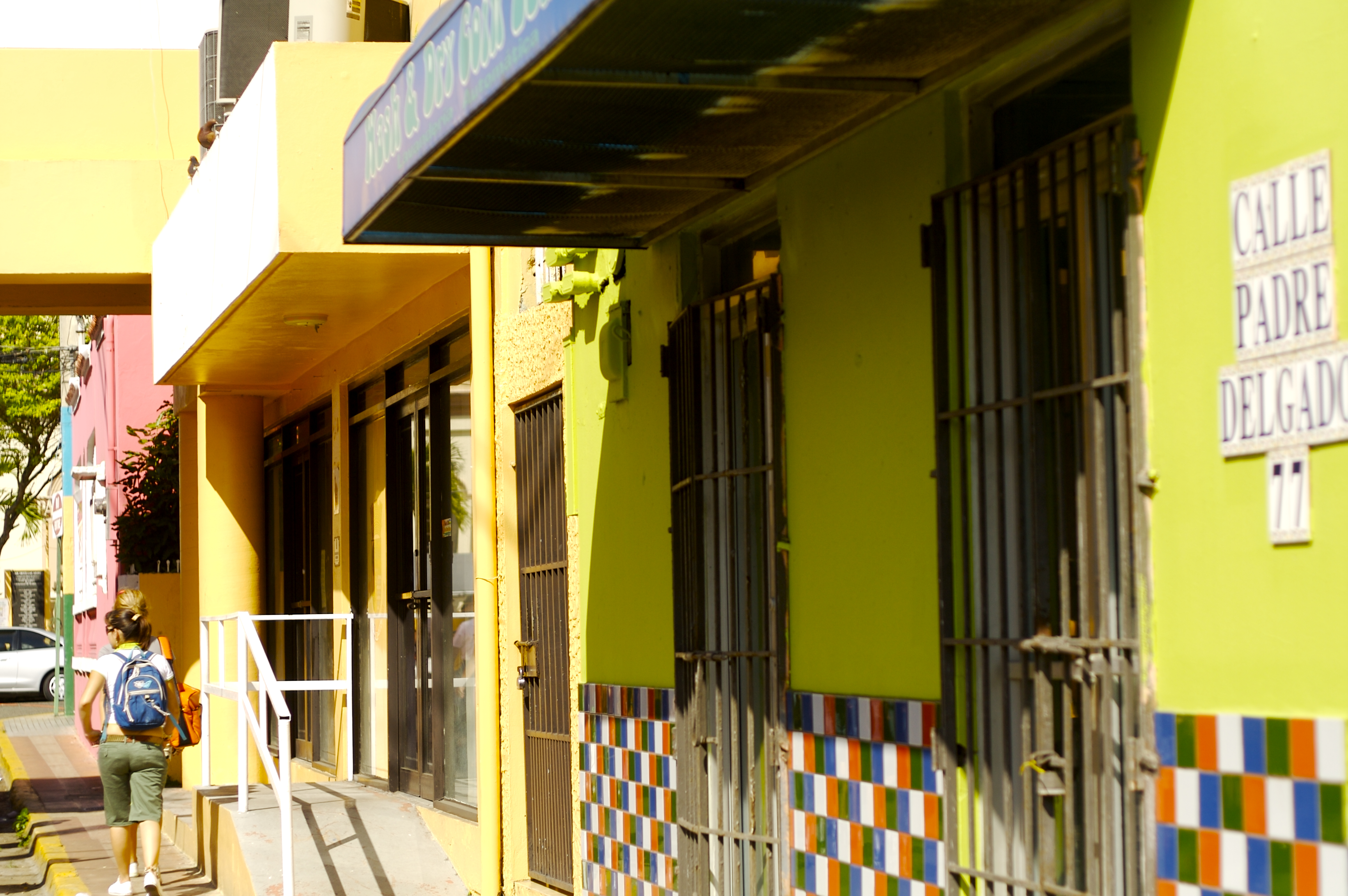
Calle Padre Delgado - barrio-pueblo

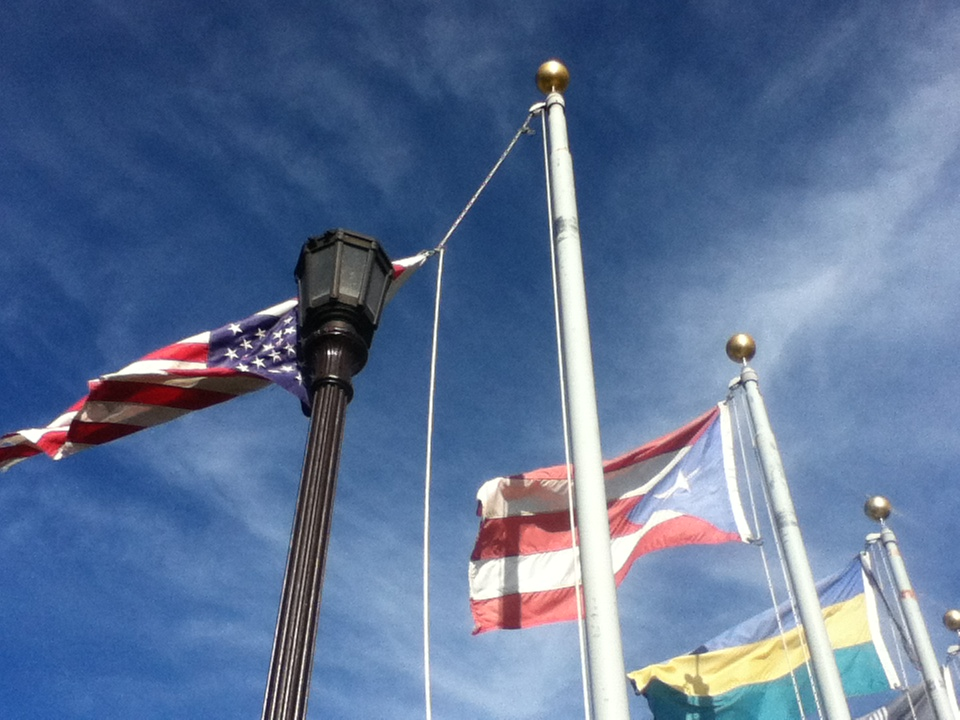
United States, Puerto Rico and Hatillo flags in Hatillo

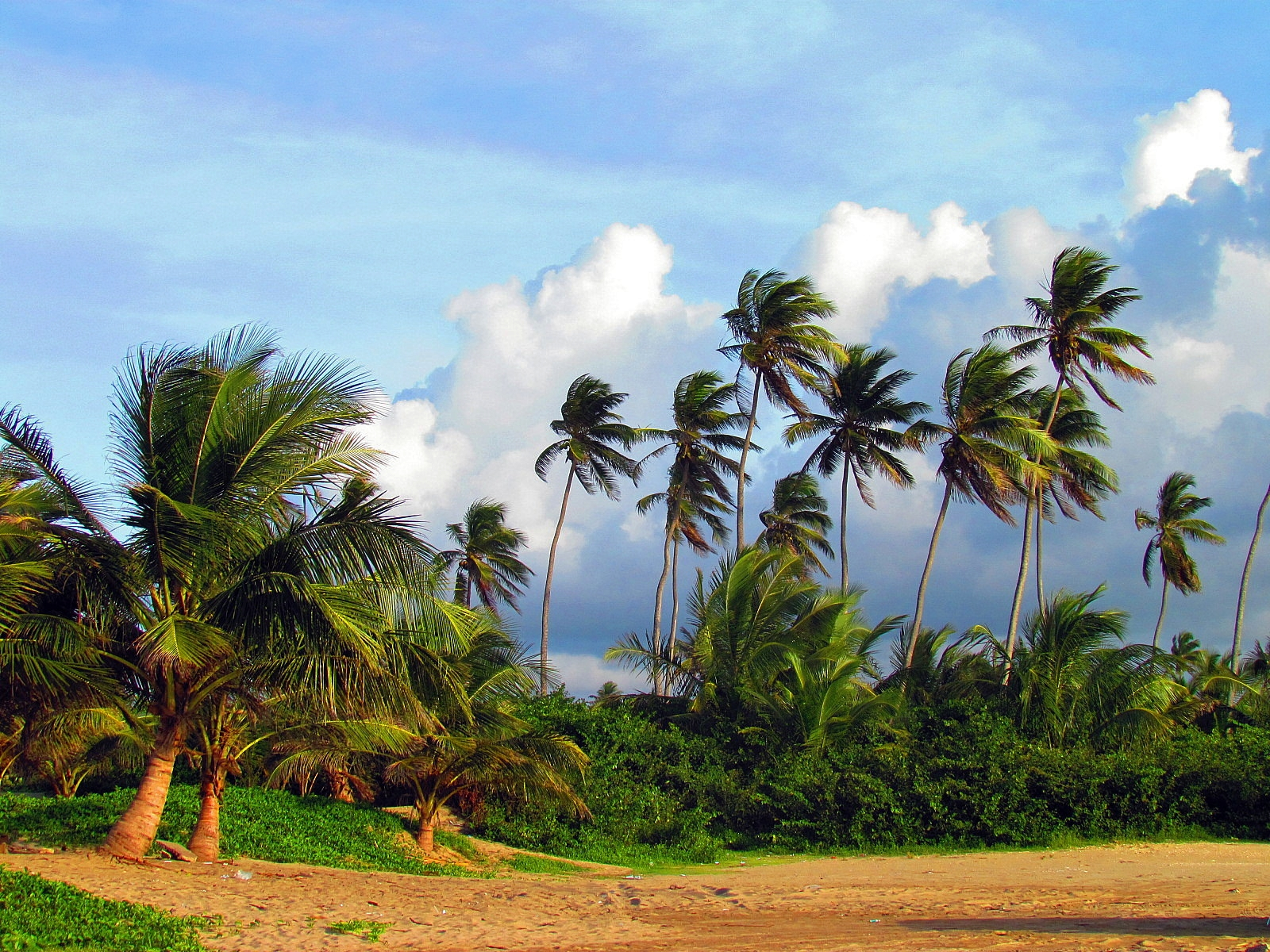
Playa Sardinera

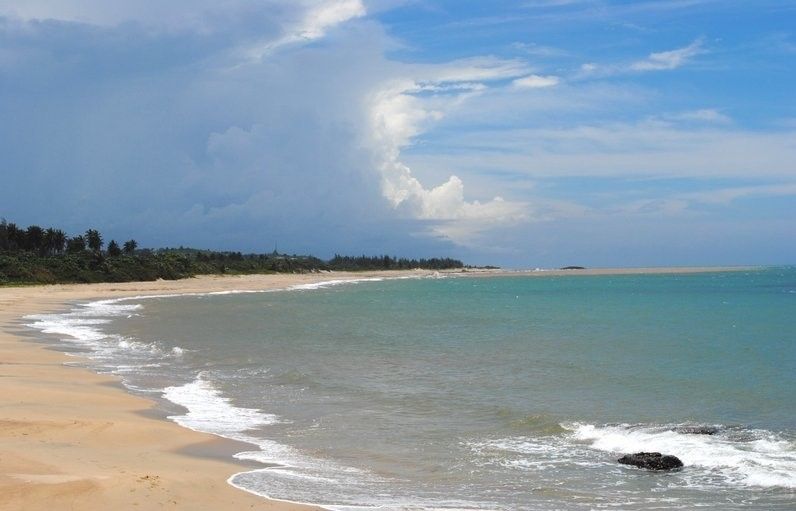
Playa La Marina in Hatillo

== See also ==
- List of Puerto Ricans
- History of Puerto Rico
