= Puerto Rico Highway 124 =

Highway in Puerto Rico

Highway 124
- Ruta 124

Route information
- Maintained by Puerto Rico DTPW
- Length: 26.8 km (16.7 mi)
- Existed: 1953–present

Major junctions
- West end: PR-119 in Las Marías barrio-pueblo
- PR-120 in Las Marías barrio-pueblo; PR-370 in Palma Escrita–Buena Vista; PR-409 in Cerrote; PR-498 in Cerrote; PR-4431 in Pezuela; PR-435 in Espino; PR-436 in Espino; PR-4432 in Espino–La Torre; PR-111 in Pueblo
- East end: PR-1111 in Pueblo–Lares barrio-pueblo

Location
- Country: United States
- Territory: Puerto Rico
- Municipalities: Las Marías, San Sebastián, Lares

Highway system
- Roads in Puerto Rico; List
← PR-123	→ PR-125

Puerto Rico Highway 124 (PR-124) is a rural road that connects from Lares to Las Marías. This highway extends from PR-119 to PR-1111.

== Route description ==
It is a curvy road, which crosses the Río Grande de Añasco in barrio Espino (between Lares and Las Marías). Among its intersections are PR-111 (in Lares), PR-120 (to Maricao) and PR-119.

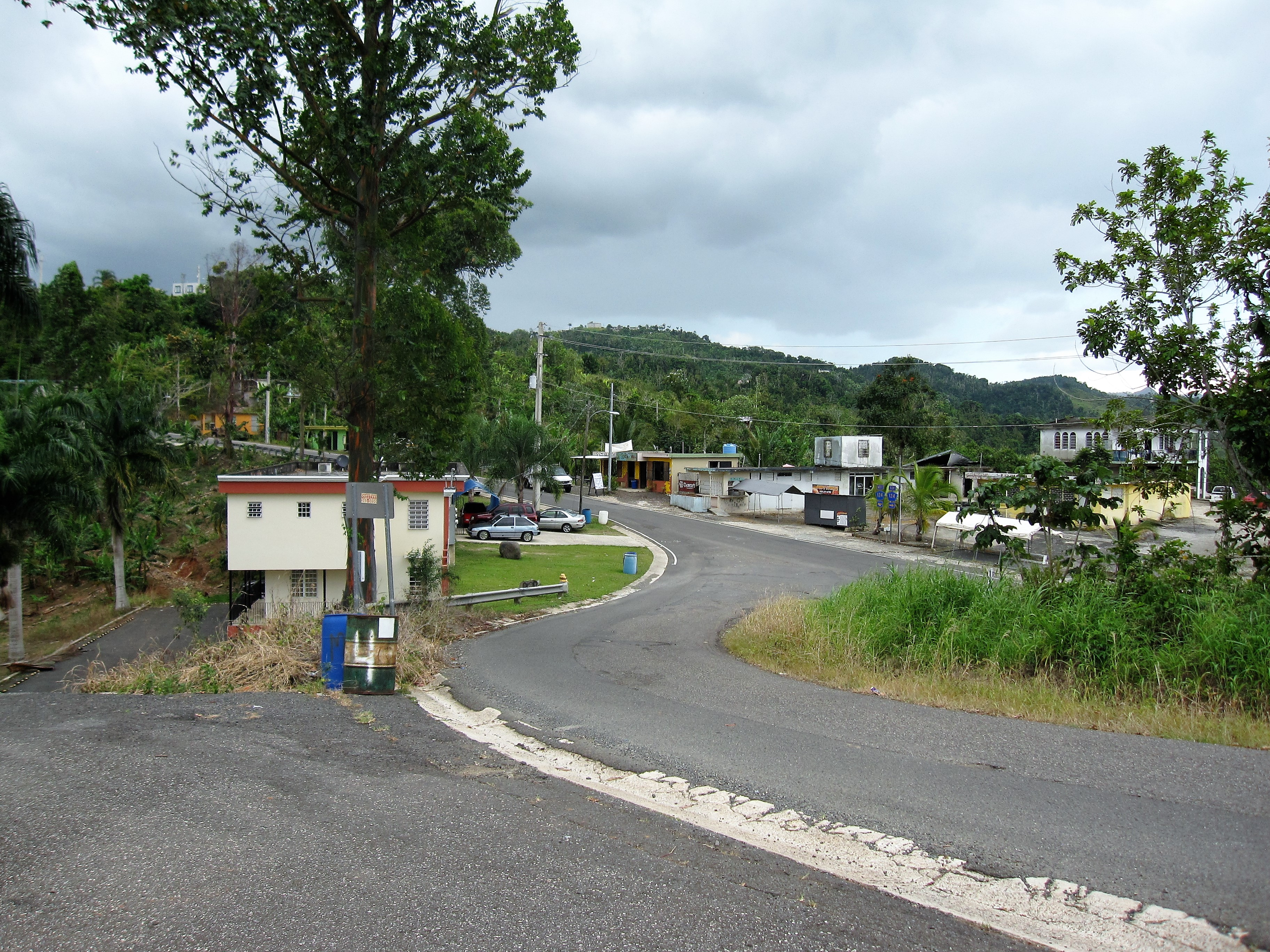
PR-435 at its junction with PR-124

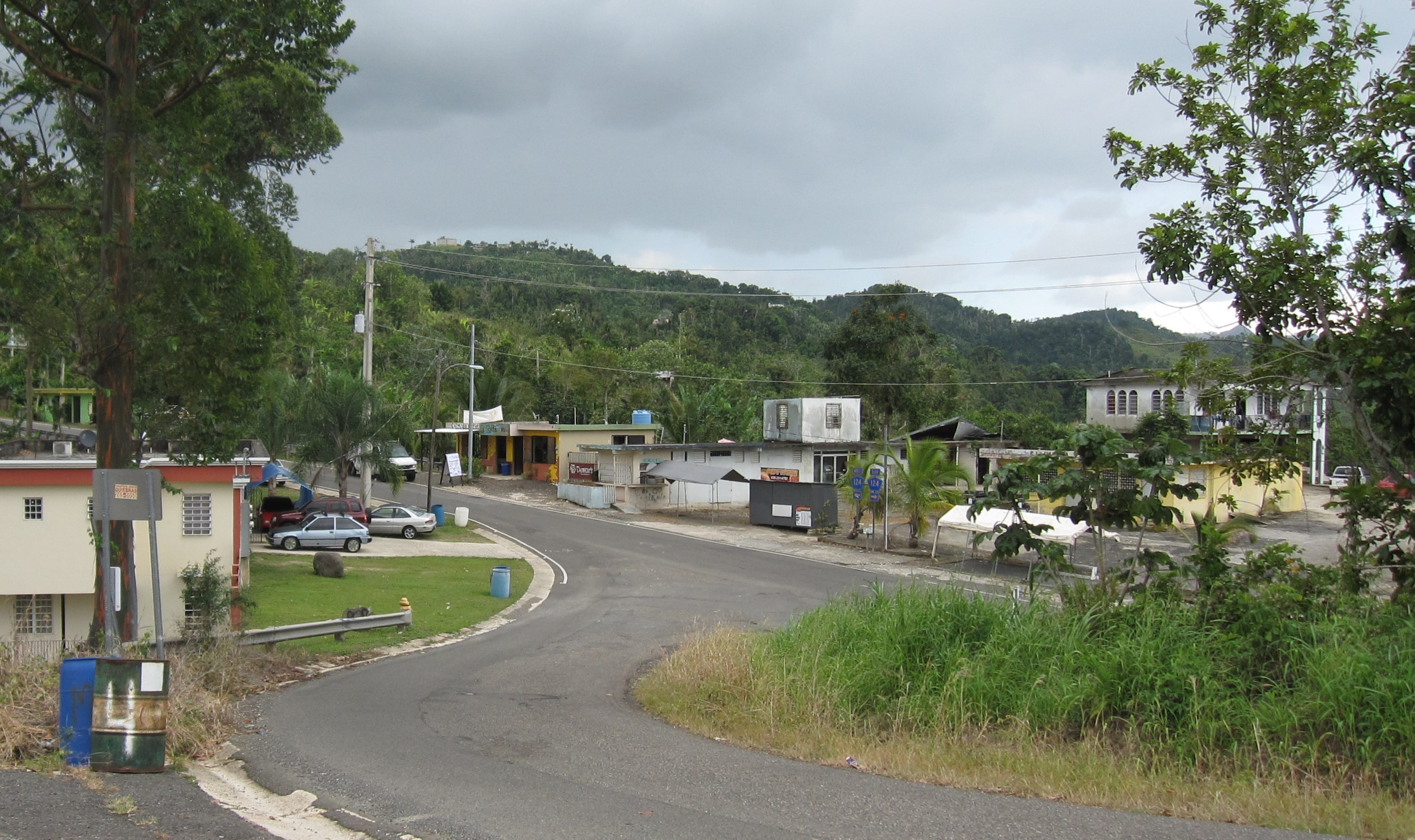
Puerto Rico Highway 124

== Major intersections ==
Municipality	Location	km	mi	Destinations	Notes
Las Marías	Las Marías barrio-pueblo	0.0	0.0	PR-119 – San Sebastián, Mayagüez, San Germán	Western terminus of PR-124
Las Marías	Las Marías barrio-pueblo	0.1	0.062	PR-120 south (Avenida Mathias Brugman) – Maricao	
Las Marías	Palma Escrita–Buena Vista line	6.8	4.2	PR-370 – Purísima Concepción	
Las Marías	Cerrote	10.8– 10.9	6.7– 6.8	PR-409 west – Bucarabones	
Las Marías	Cerrote	12.8	8.0	PR-498 – Cerrote	
Lares	Pezuela	16.3	10.1	PR-4431 – Río Prieto	
Las Marías	No major junctions				
San Sebastián	No major junctions				
Lares	Espino	21.5	13.4	PR-435 (Carretera Perchas) – San Sebastián	
Lares	Espino	23.7	14.7	PR-436 – Espino	
Lares	Espino–La Torre line	24.2– 24.3	15.0– 15.1	PR-4432 – La Torre	
Lares	Pueblo	26.6– 26.7	16.5– 16.6	PR-111 (Avenida Los Patriotas) – San Sebastián, Utuado	
Lares	Pueblo–Lares barrio-pueblo line	26.8	16.7	PR-1111 – Lares	Eastern terminus of PR-124
1.000 mi = 1.609 km; 1.000 km = 0.621 mi

== See also ==
- 1953 Puerto Rico highway renumbering
