= List of barrios and sectors of Lares, Puerto Rico =

Like all municipalities of Puerto Rico, Lares is subdivided into administrative units called barrios, which are, in contemporary times, roughly comparable to minor civil divisions, (and means wards or boroughs or neighborhoods in English). The barrios and subbarrios, in turn, are further subdivided into smaller local populated place areas/units called sectores (sectors in English). The types of sectores may vary, from normally sector to urbanización to reparto to barriada to residencial, among others. Some sectors appear in two barrios.

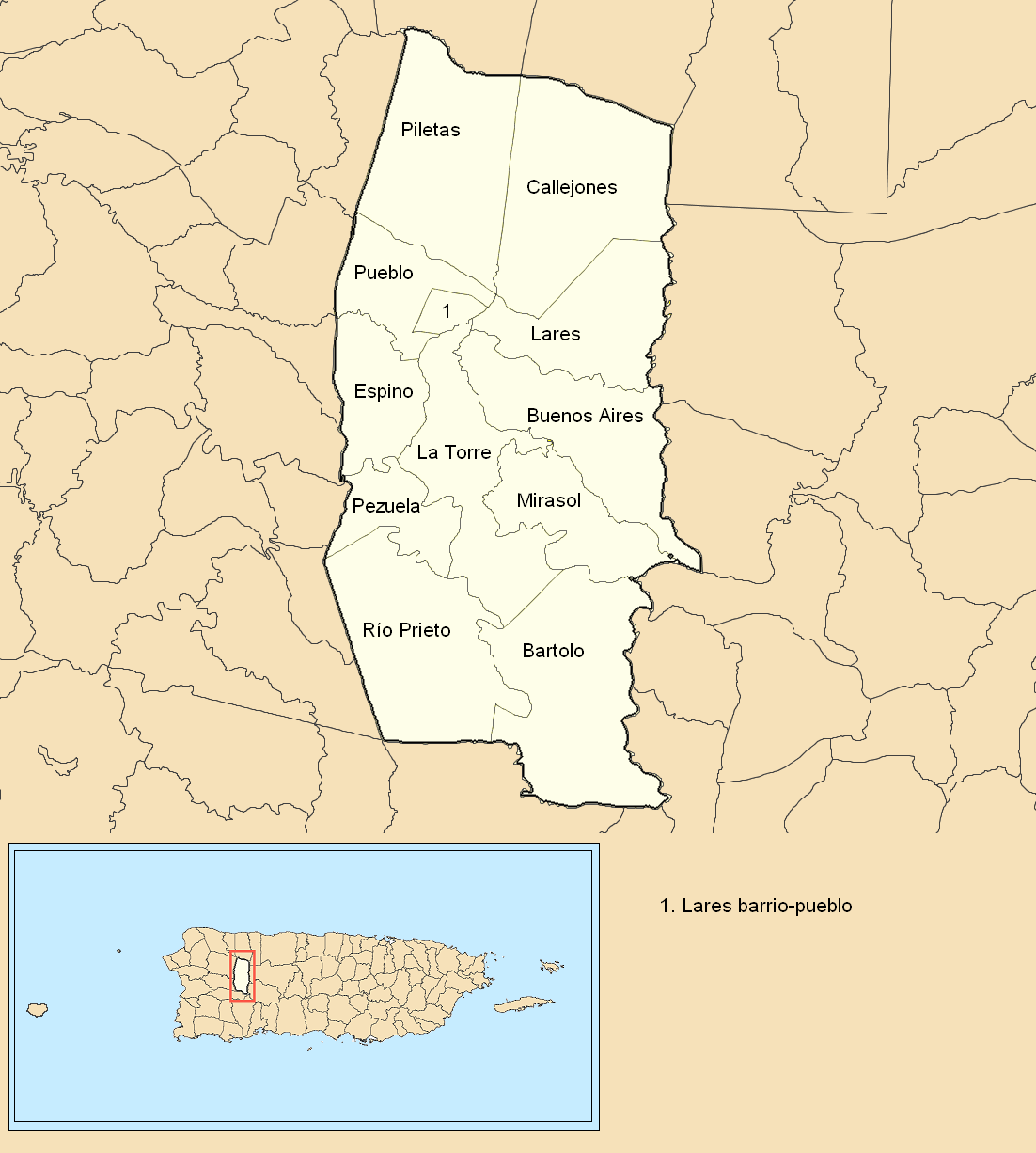
Lares map with barrio subdivisions

== List of sectors by barrio ==
=== Bartolo ===
- Calle Cirila
- Calle Cooperativismo
- Calle Los Millonarios
- Calle Paraíso
- Carretera Los Romero
- Carretera Vilella
- Cerro Las Avispas
- Condominio Alturas de Castañer
- Poblado Castañer
- Sector Calbache
- Sector Grillasca
- Sector Guano
- Sector La Cuesta
- Sector Rábanos
- Sector Regino
- Sector San Juan Bautista
- Tramo Carretera 128
- Tramo Carretera 135
- Tramo Carretera 431

=== Buenos Aires ===
- Carretera Acueducto
- Finca Magraner
- Hacienda Delgado
- La Pepa
- Sector Alto Grande
- Sector Jobos Mario
- Sector Jobos
- Sector La América
- Sector La Gloria
- Sector La Matilde
- Sector Matías
- Sector Miján
- Sector Morell
- Sector Palmasola
- Sector Tostero
- Tramo Carretera 128
- Tramo Carretera 129

=== Callejones ===
- Arco Iris
- Berrocal
- Camino Emau
- Camino Julito Nieves
- Carmelo Mercado
- Copa de Oro
- Demetrio Otaño
- El Maná
- Las Lajas
- Los Adames
- Los Chayotes
- Los Luciano
- Los Otaño
- Miro Torres
- Monchín Rivera
- Sector Crematorio
- Sector Cueva Pajita
- Sector El 21
- Sector El Taino
- Sector Gregorio Rivera
- Sector La Gallera
- Sector La Pista
- Sector La Sierra
- Sector Las Campanas
- Sector León Vega
- Sector Los Nieves
- Sector Los Santiago
- Sector Pagán Sector
- Sector Pedro Colón
- Sector Zenón Rivera
- Sico Torres
- Tramo Carretera 129
- Tramo Carretera 134
- Tramo Carretera 454

=== Espino ===
- Arco Iris
- Berrocal
- Camino Caballito
- Camino David González
- Camino Emau
- Camino Herminio Hernández
- Camino Julito Nieves
- Carmelo Mercado
- Copa de Oro
- Demetrio Otaño
- El Maná
- Las Lajas
- Los Adames
- Los Chayotes
- Los Luciano
- Los Otaño
- Parcelas Tabonuco
- Sector Ceiba
- Sector Cheíto Vega
- Sector Justo Malo
- Sector La Cabaña
- Sector Mameyes
- Sector Milito Méndez
- Sector Oliver
- Sector Raty Guivas
- Sector Tellado
- Sector Toño Vega
- Sector Trofy Lares
- Tramo Carretera 124 (Lado este desde la Ferretería Los Muchachos hasta la residencia del señor Juanma Collazo)
- Tramo Carretera 124 (Parte oeste desde el negocio Rincón de los Trovadores hasta el Garage de Pepito Collazo)
- Tramo Carretera 436
- Urbanización Brisas de Lares

=== Lares ===
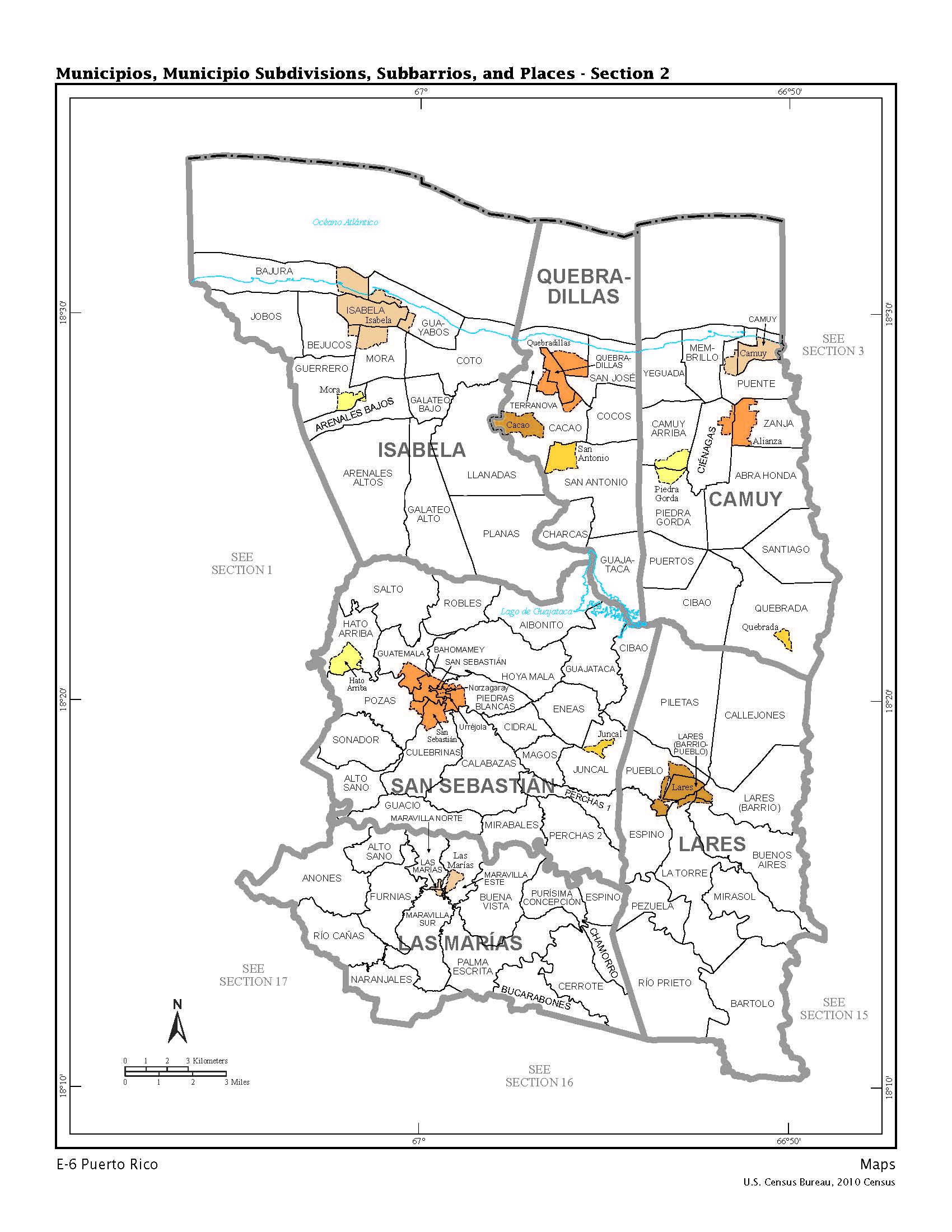
US 2010 census map of Municipios, Municipio Subdivisions, Subbarrios, and Places of Isabela, Quebradillas, Camuy, Lares, Las Marías and San Sebastián

- Camino Obispo
- Cuesta Mayía
- El 25
- La Sabana Sumidero
- Las Casetas Capotillo
- Las Tres Marías
- Sector Jobos López
- Sector Jobos Mario
- Sector La Sierra Tatí
- Sector Las Minas
- Sector Los Muros
- Sector Manolo Toledo
- Sector Miján Parcelas Miría
- Sector Palmarllano
- Sector Sierra Miría
- Tramo Carretera 111
- Tramo Carretera 134
- Urbanización Villa Palmira

=== Lares barrio-pueblo ===
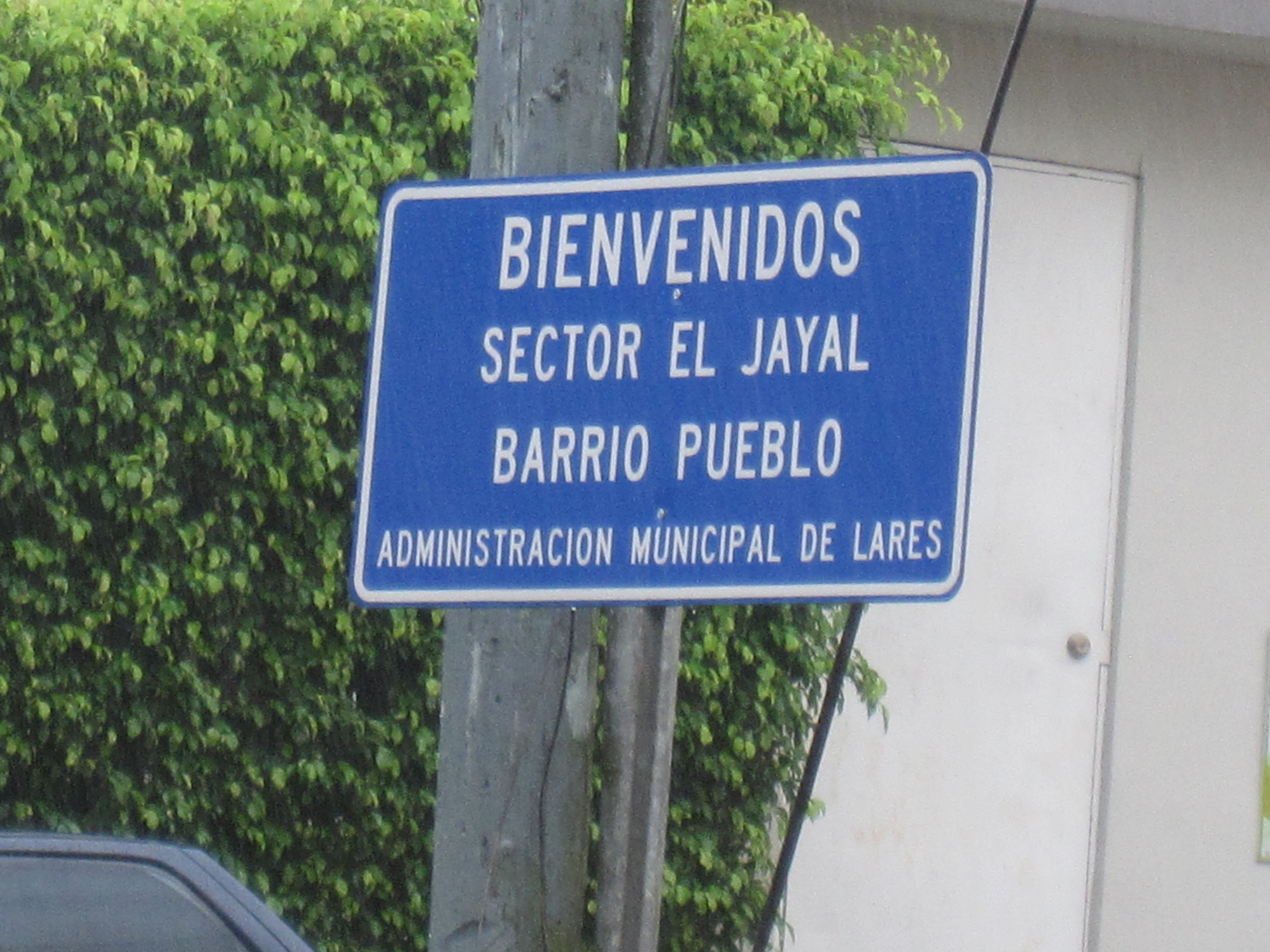
Sector El Jayal street sign in Barrio Pueblo, Lares

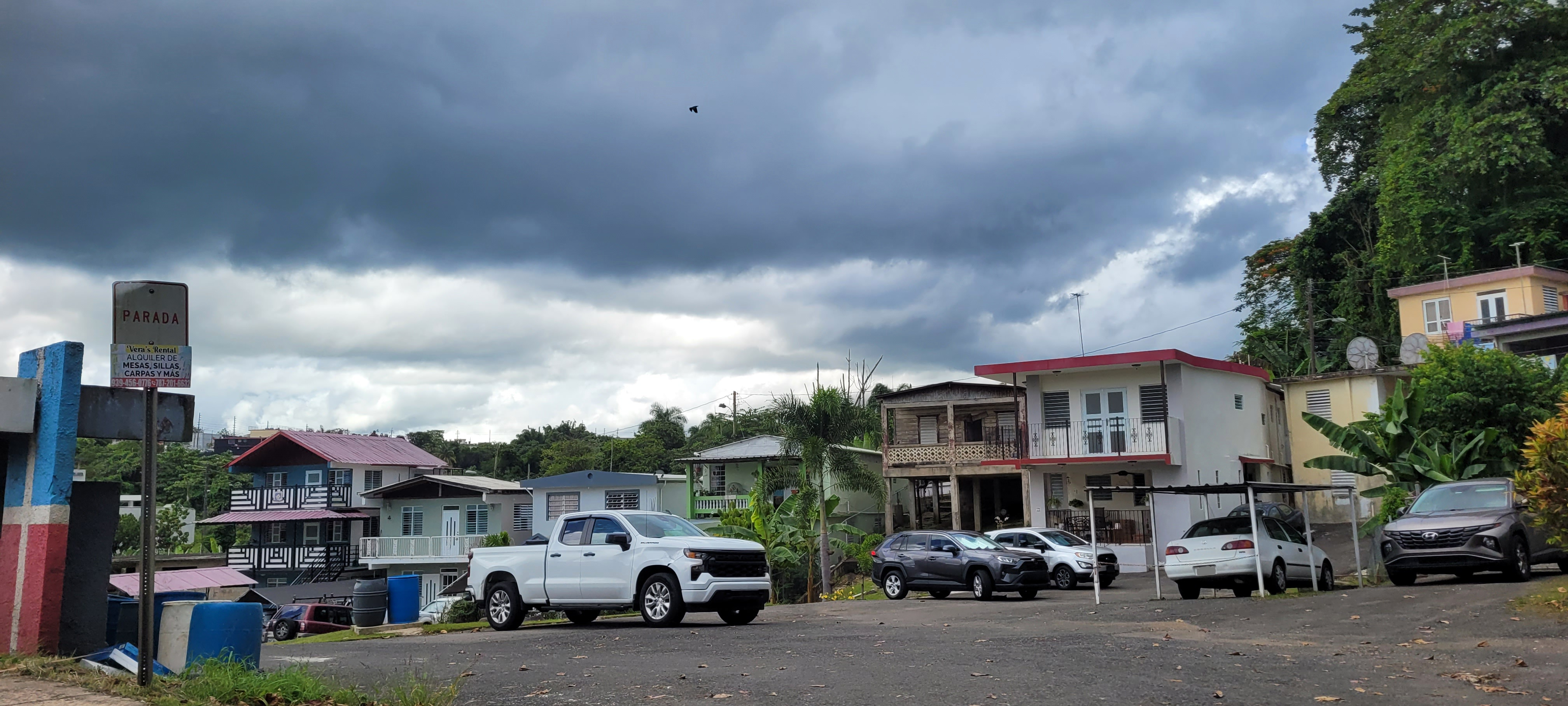
Barriada Viera

- Aurelio Bernal
- Avenida Los Patriotas
- Barriada Arizona
- Barriada Bajadero
- Barriada San Felipe
- Barriada Viera
- Calle Aldarondo
- Calle Echegaray
- Calle El Peligro
- Calle Emilio Castro Rodríguez
- Calle Ermita
- Calle Felipe Arana
- Calle Hospital
- Calle La Gallera
- Calle Molino Calle Muñoz Rivera
- Calle Palmer
- Calle Rafael Castro
- Calle Raúl Gándara
- Calle San José
- Calle San Pablo
- Calle Sócrates González
- Calle Vilella
- Calle Villa Independencia
- Calle Virgilio Acevedo
- Camino González
- Camino Henrry Arana
- Carretera Acueducto
- Cerro Márquez
- Condominio Lares Gardens
- Dr. Pedro Albizu Campos
- Edificio Parques Platinos
- Edificio Terrazas El Peligro
- El Leñero
- Ensanche González
- Ensanche Sur
- Extensión Altamira
- Hacienda Borinquen
- Población
- Ramal 111 Interior
- Ramal 111 Interior (Emisora)
- Residencial Dr. Francisco Seín
- Sector Ballajá
- Sector Barranco
- Sector Desvío
- Sector Guajataca
- Sector Jardín de la Pasión
- Sector Jayal
- Sector Jobos
- Sector La Cuadra
- Sector La Monserrate
- Sector La Piedra
- Sector La Pluma
- Sector La Sierra
- Sector Los Torres
- Sector Mercedes Estades
- Sector Monte Bello
- Sector Punta Brava
- Sector Seburuquillo
- Tramo Carretera 111
- Tramo Carretera 124
- Urbanización Altamira
- Urbanización Alturas de Borinquen
- Urbanización Buena Vista Calle Lecaroz
- Urbanización Buena Vista
- Urbanización Campo Alegre
- Urbanización Jardines de Lares
- Urbanización Monte Bello
- Urbanización Palmas del Sol
- Urbanización Villa Borinquen
- Urbanización Villa Seral

=== La Torre ===
- Cerro La Torre
- Comunidad Los Milagros
- Finca Calcerrada
- Finca Delgado
- Finca Ostolaza
- Finca Silvestrini
- Hacienda Monserrate Finca Pay Méndez
- La Paragua
- La Vega Calcerrada
- La Vega de Los Acevedo
- Las Toldas
- Puente Blanco
- Sector Collazo
- Sector Isleta Camino Arana (Ramal 431)
- Sector Los Quemaos
- Sector Mercedes Estades
- Sector Morell
- Sector Tosquero
- Tramo Carretera 128

=== Mirasol ===
- Comunidad Los 40
- El Banco
- La Loma
- La Vega Calcerrada
- Parcelas Angela Vilella
- Sector Boquerón

=== Pezuela ===
- Hacienda Marrero
- Hacienda Rojas
- Hacienda Vilella
- La Vega de los Acevedo
- Maguelles
- Sector Ezenelías
- Sector Sisco
- Tramo Carretera 431

=== Piletas ===
- Lito Ramos
- Palo Pana
- Sector Aquino
- Sector Arroyo
- Sector Bayón
- Sector Borges
- Sector Cabán
- Sector Castro
- Sector Catalino Rodríguez
- Sector Club Rotario
- Sector Coquí
- Sector Escuela 1
- Sector Juan Sosa
- Sector La Pista
- Sector Las Casetas
- Sector Los López Segarra
- Sector Núñez
- Sector Olavarría
- Sector Pedro Molina
- Sector Ramón Román
- Sector Reyes Lugo
- Sector Segunda Unidad
- Sector Soller
- Tramo Carretera 453

=== Pueblo ===
- Avenida Los Patriotas
- Hacienda Borinquen
- Sector Ballajá
- Sector Barranco
- Sector La Cuadra
- Sector La Piedra
- Sector La Pluma
- Sector Seburuquillo
- Tramo Carretera 111
- Urbanización Alturas de Borinquen
- Urbanización Campo Alegre
- Urbanización Palmas del Sol

=== Río Prieto ===
- Camino Ballester
- Camino Rullán
- Cerro Malo
- Sector Boquilla
- Sector La Monserrate
- Sector Los Márquez
- Sector Vélez
- Sector Vilella
- Tramo Carretera 431

== See also ==
- List of communities in Puerto Rico
