= Perchas 2 =

Barrio of San Sebastián, Puerto Rico

- Barrio
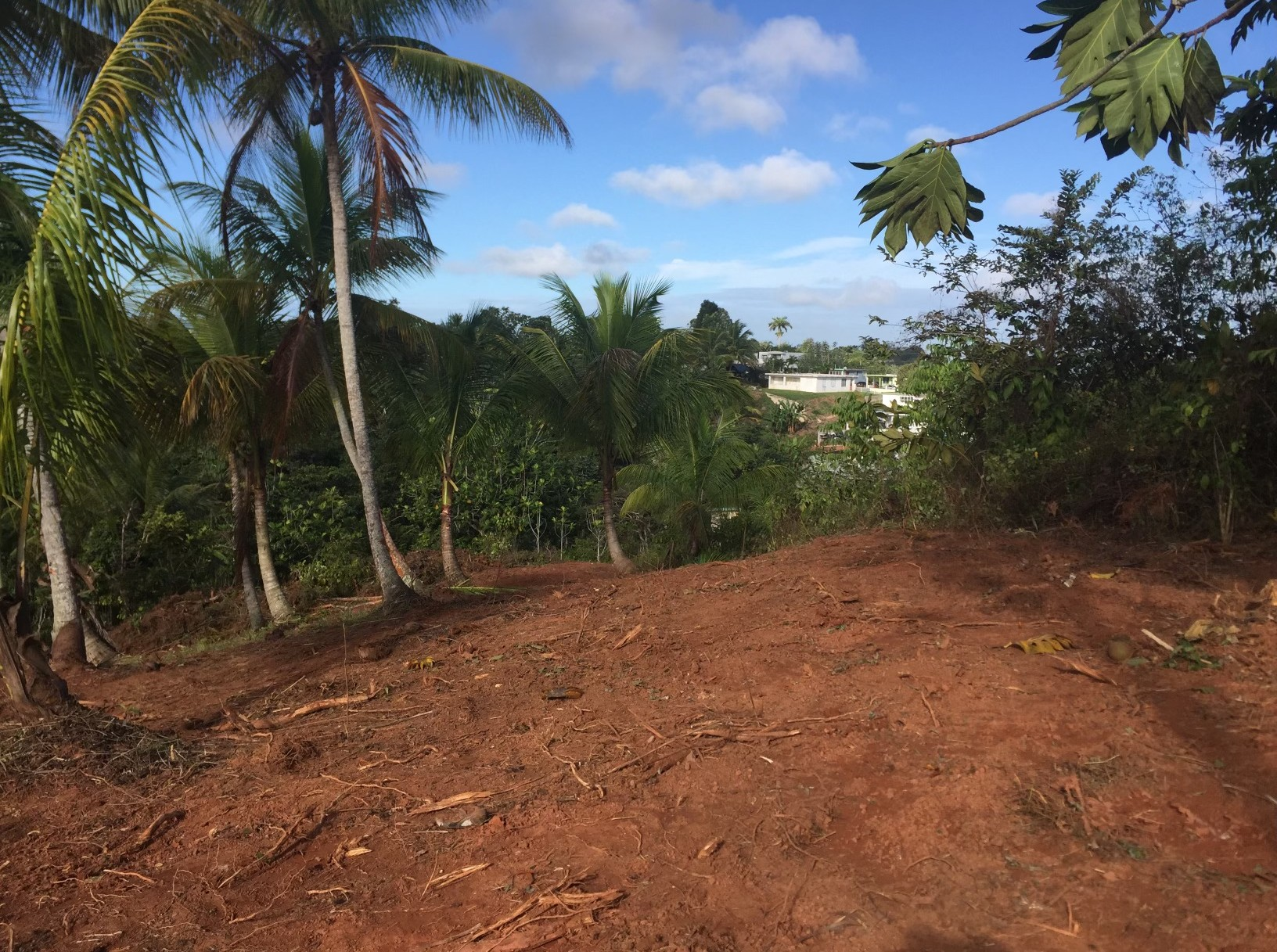
- View in Perchas 2

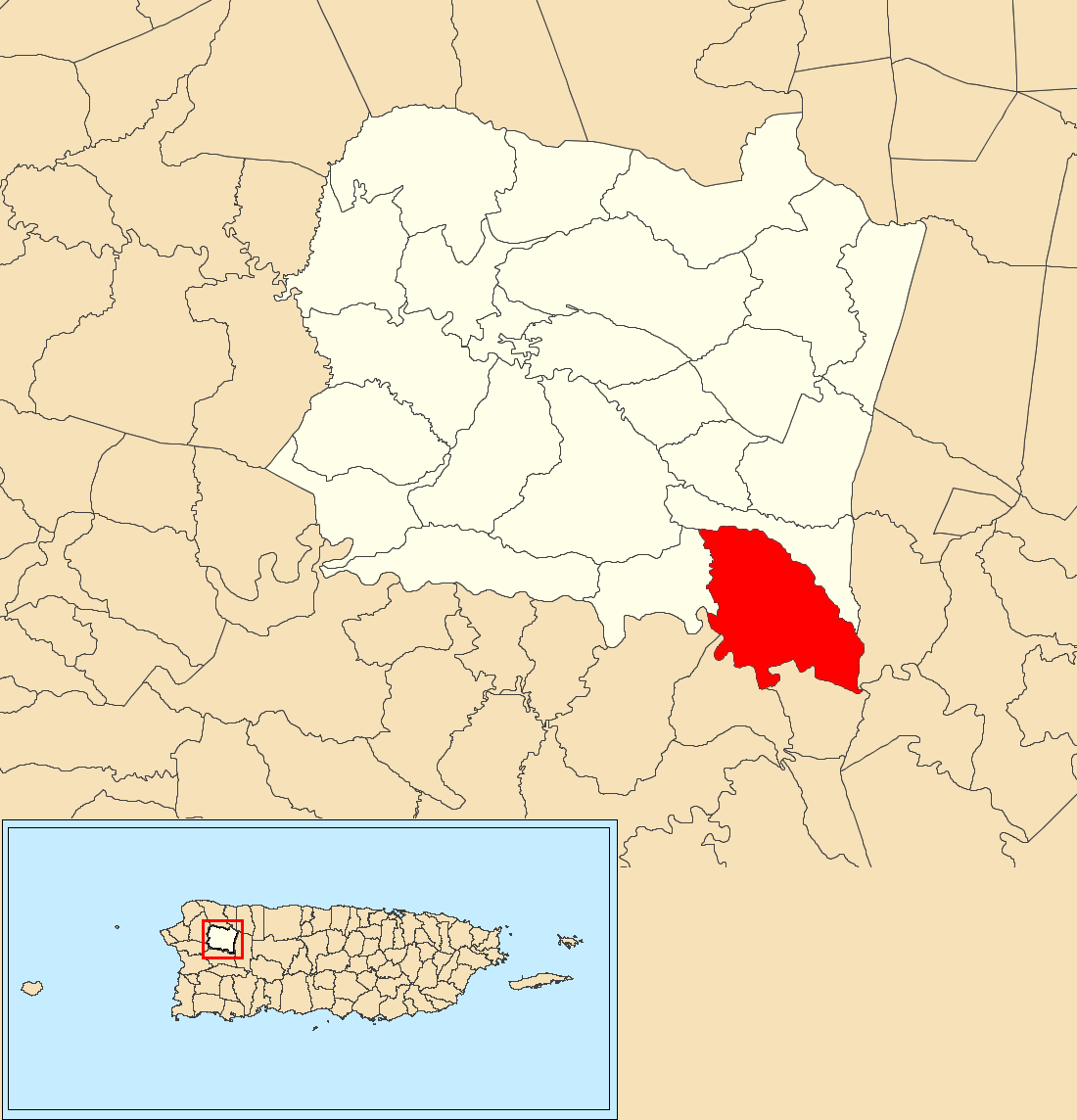
- Location of Perchas 2 within the municipality of San Sebastián shown in red

- Location of Puerto Rico
- Coordinates: 18°16′16″N 66°55′38″W
- Commonwealth: Puerto Rico
- Municipality: San Sebastián

Area
  - Total: 4.33 sq mi (11.2 km^{2})
  - Land: 4.33 sq mi (11.2 km^{2})
  - Water: 0 sq mi (0 km^{2})
- Elevation: 909 ft (277 m)

Population (2010)
  - Total: 988
  - Density: 228.2/sq mi (88.1/km^{2})
- Source: 2010 Census
- Time zone: UTC−4 (AST)

Perchas 2 is a barrio in the municipality of San Sebastián, Puerto Rico. Its population in 2010 was 988.

== History ==
Perchas 2 was in Spain's gazetteers until Puerto Rico was ceded by Spain in the aftermath of the Spanish–American War under the terms of the Treaty of Paris of 1898 and became an unincorporated territory of the United States. In 1899, the United States Department of War conducted a census of Puerto Rico finding that the combined population of Perchas 1 and Perchas 2 barrios was 1,429.

Historical population
Census	Pop.	Note	%±
1910	972		—
1920	1,066		9.7%
1930	1,082		1.5%
1940	971		−10.3%
1950	1,049		8.0%
1960	1,118		6.6%
1970	682		−39.0%
1980	814		19.4%
1990	945		16.1%
2000	1,072		13.4%
2010	988		−7.8%
U.S. Decennial Census; 1900 (N/A) 1910-1930; 1930-1950 1980-2000 2010

== Sectors ==
Barrios (which are roughly comparable to minor civil divisions) in turn are further subdivided into smaller local populated place areas/units called sectores (sectors in English). The types of sectores may vary, from normally sector to urbanización to reparto to barriada to residencial, among others.

The following sectors are in Perchas 2 barrio:

Carretera 124, Carretera 435, Comunidad Alturas de Borinquén, Parcelas García Méndez, Sector Ángel Ríos, Sector Entrada Oronoz, Sector Finca Los Abuelos, Sector Genaro Vélez, Sector Lito Rodríguez, Sector Olavarría, Sector Pablo Fernández, Sector Pelo Muerto, Sector Perfecto Rodríguez, Sector Parcelas González, Sector Pulio Rodríguez, Sector Santo Domingo, and Sector Tosquera.

== Gallery ==
Scenes in Perchas 2:

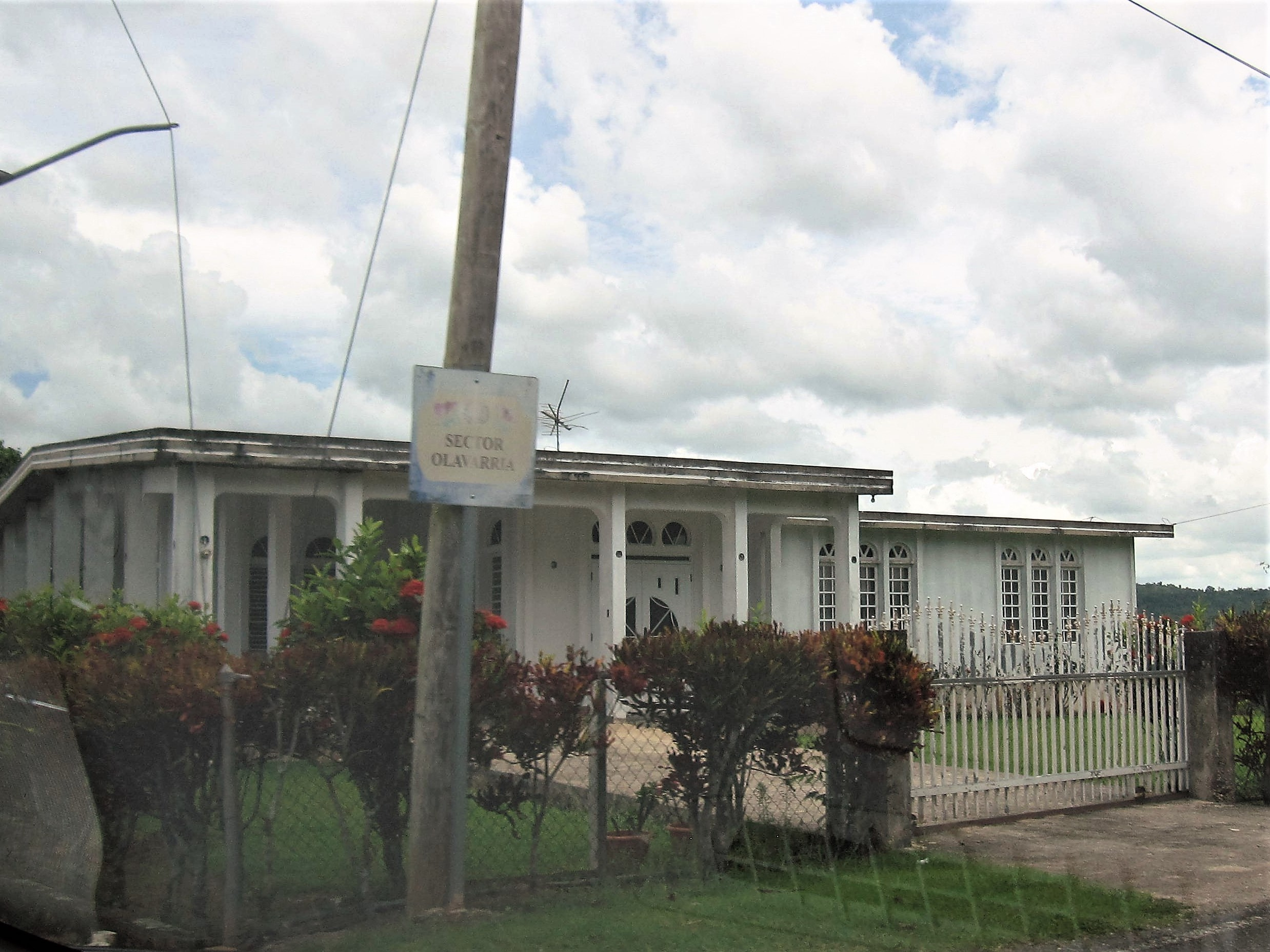
Home in Sector Olavarría

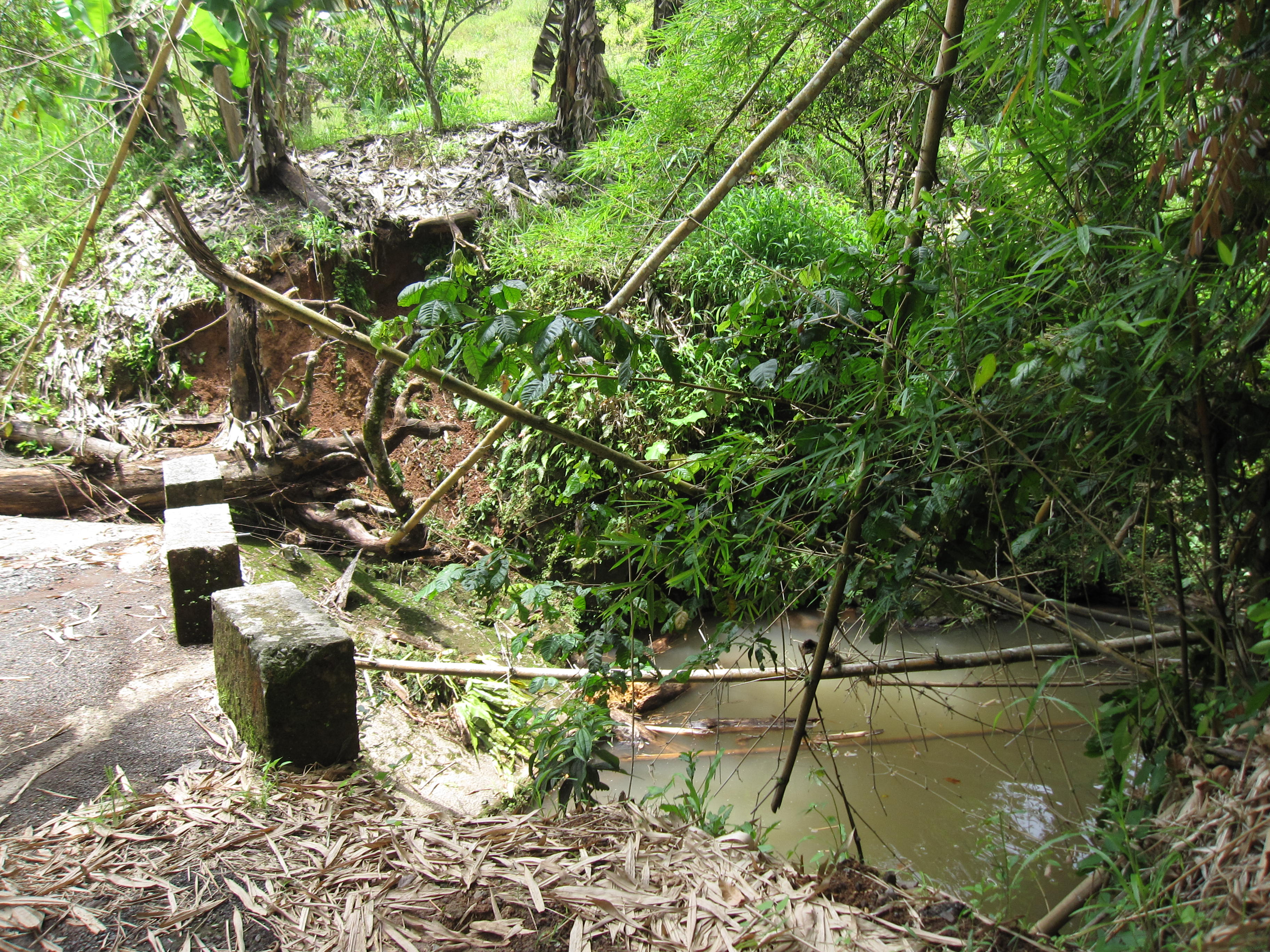
Stream in Sector Santo Domingo

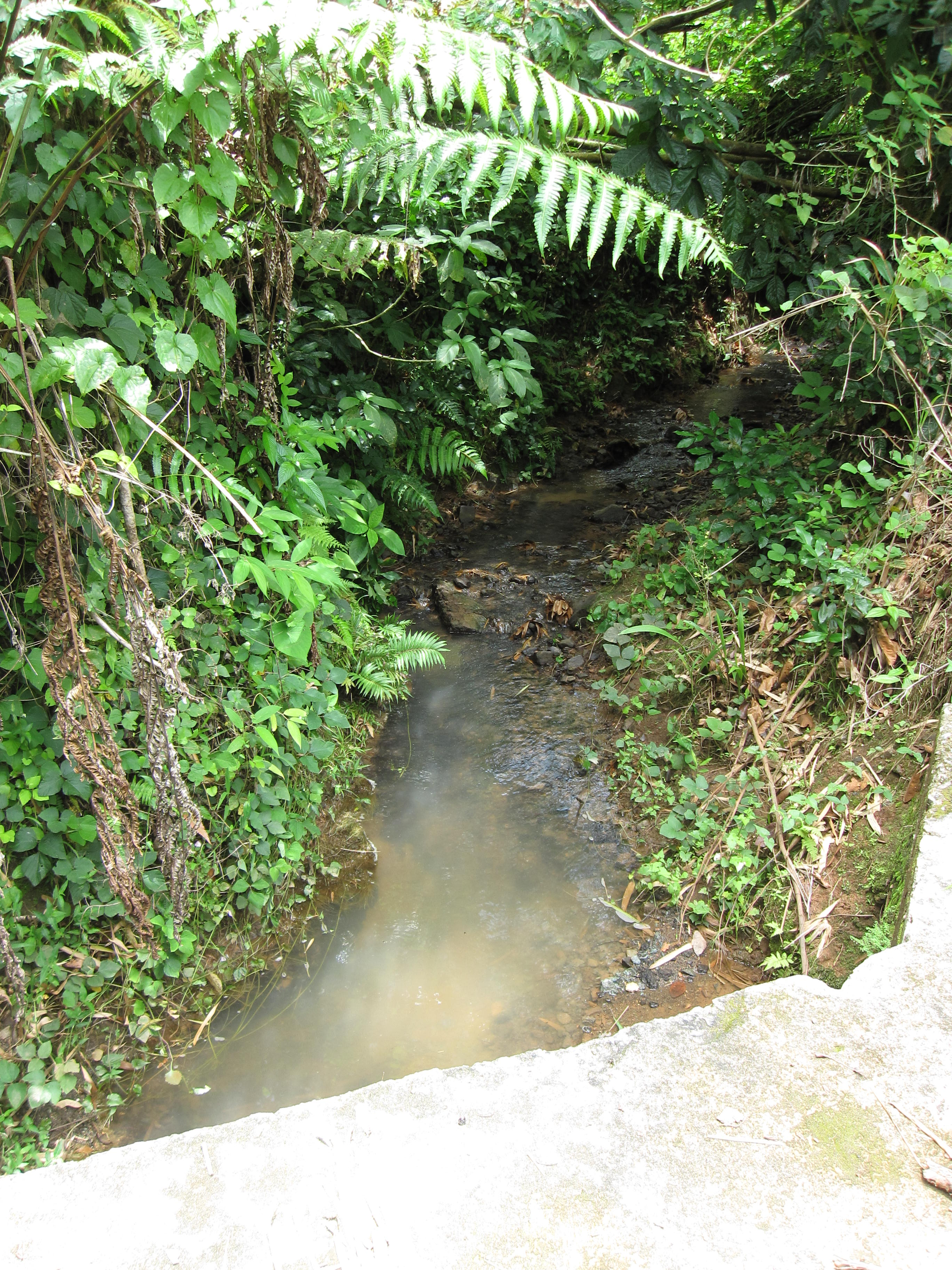
Sector Santo Domingo

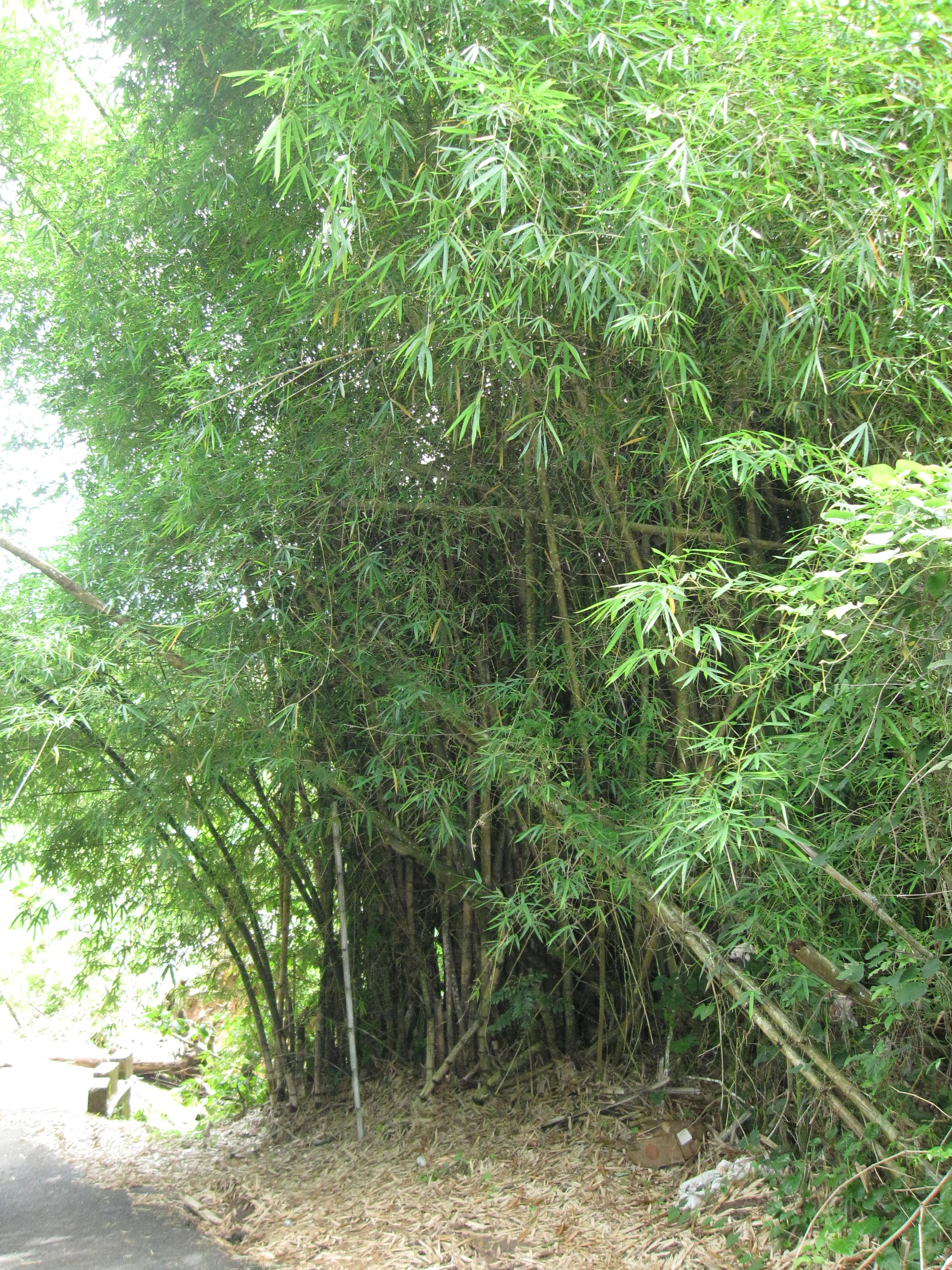
Bamboo in Sector Santo Domingo

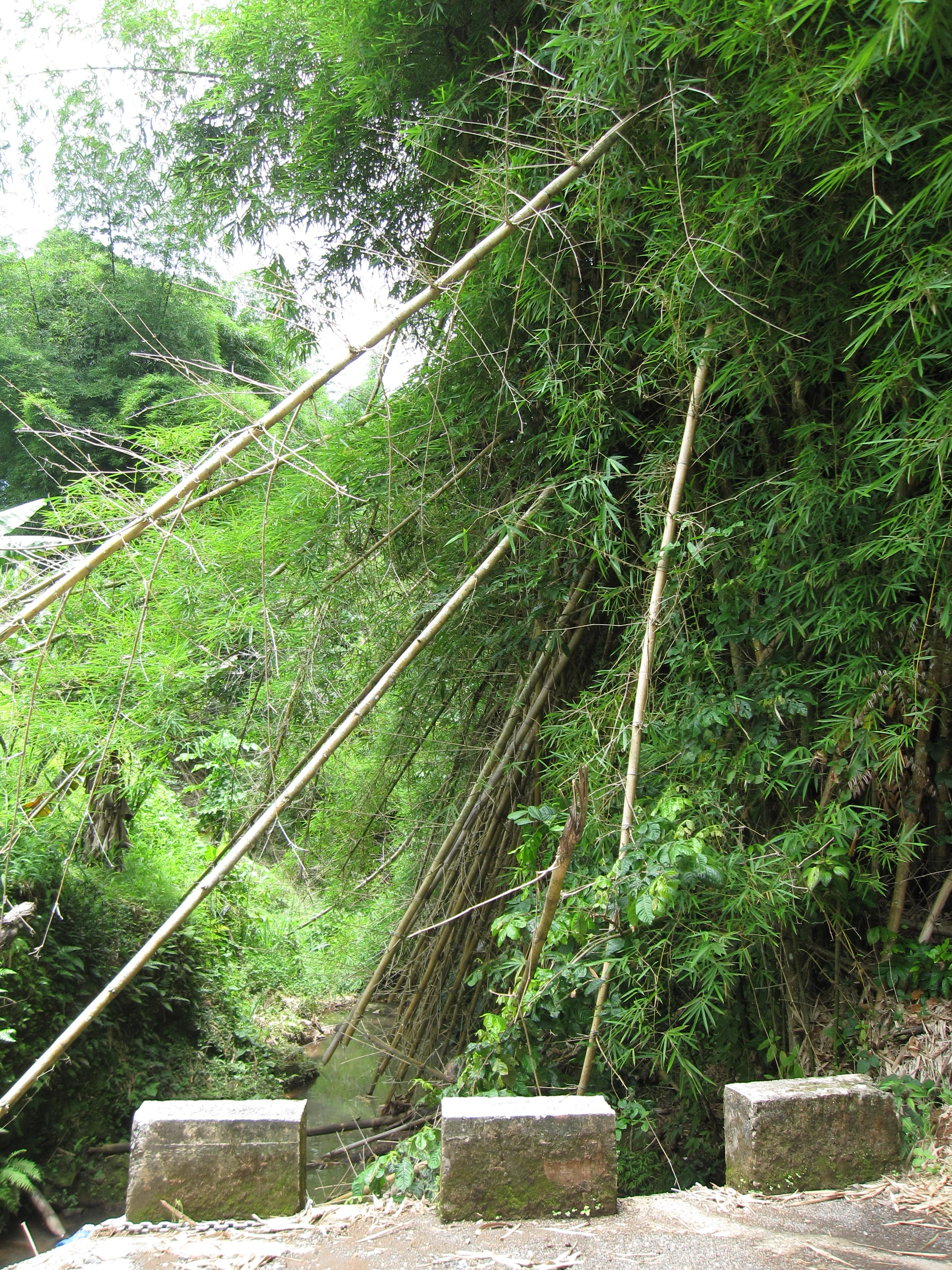
Sector Santo Domingo

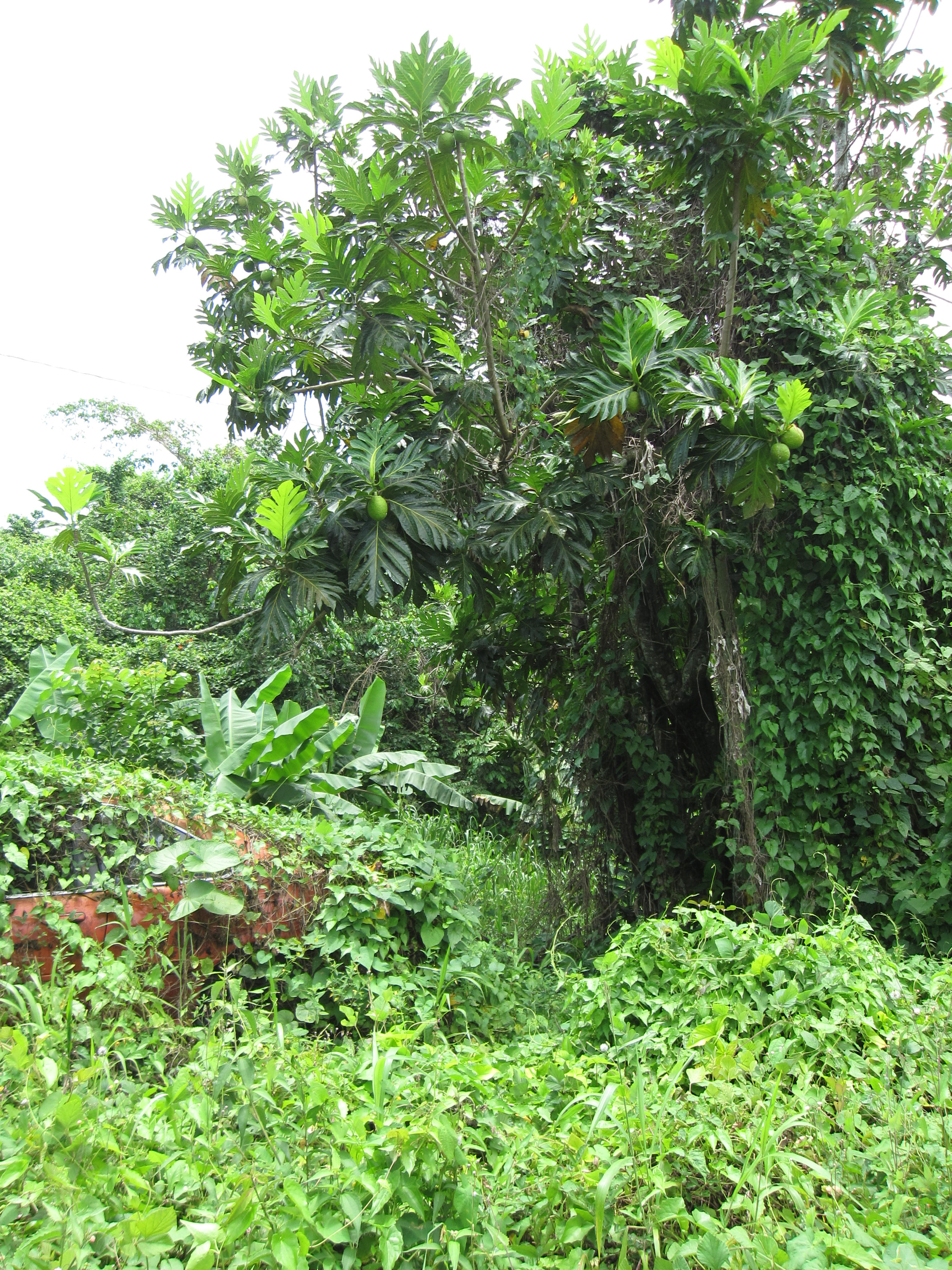
Breadfruit tree in Sector Santo Domingo

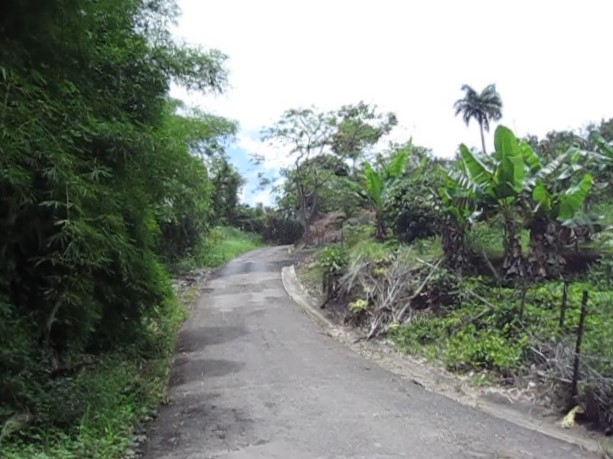
Sector Santo Domingo

== See also ==
- List of communities in Puerto Rico
- List of barrios and sectors of San Sebastián, Puerto Rico
