= Lares barrio-pueblo =

Historical and administrative center (seat) of Lares, Puerto Rico

Lares barrio-pueblo Pueblo de Lares
- Municipality Seat
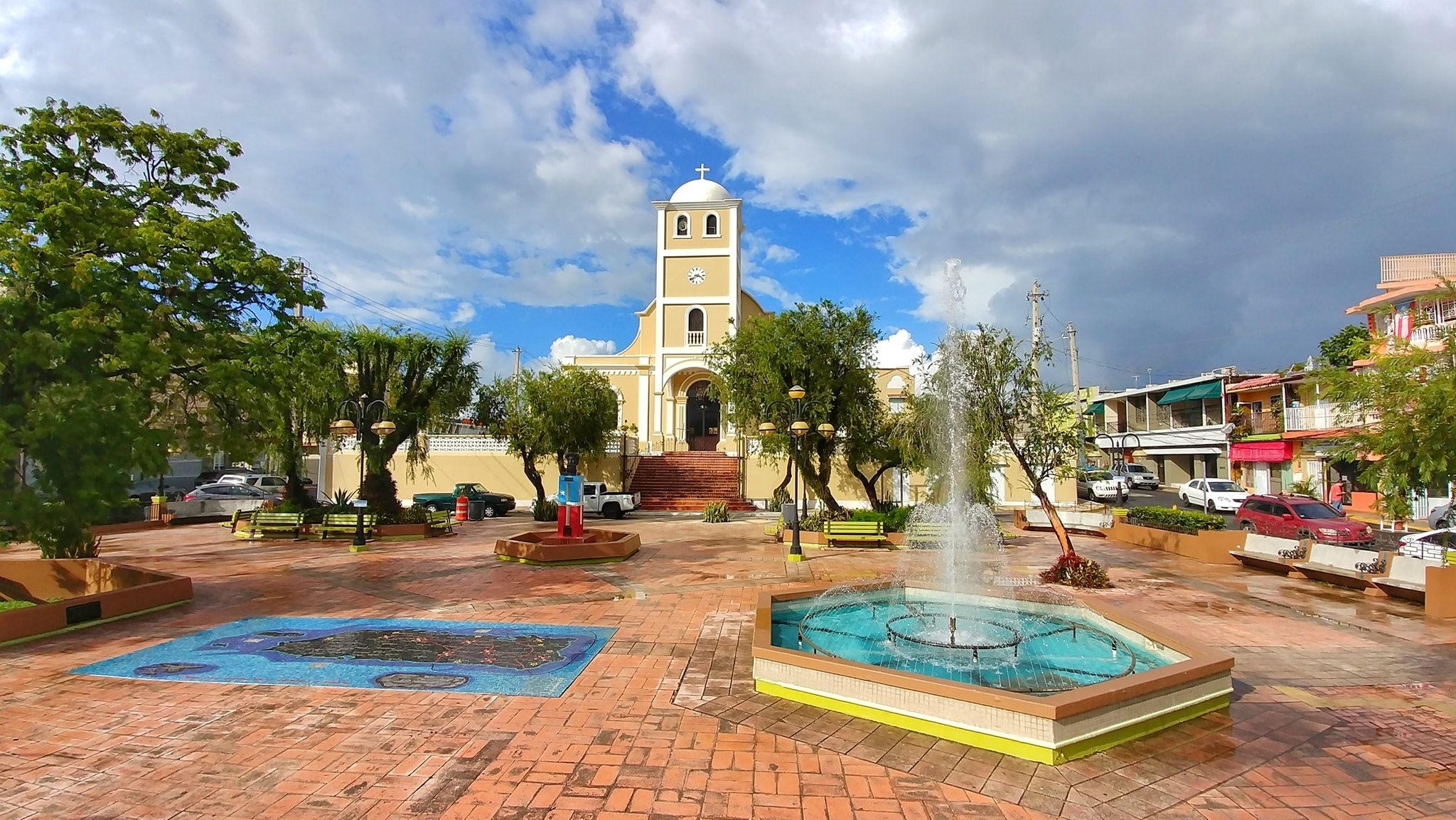
- Plaza de la Revolución

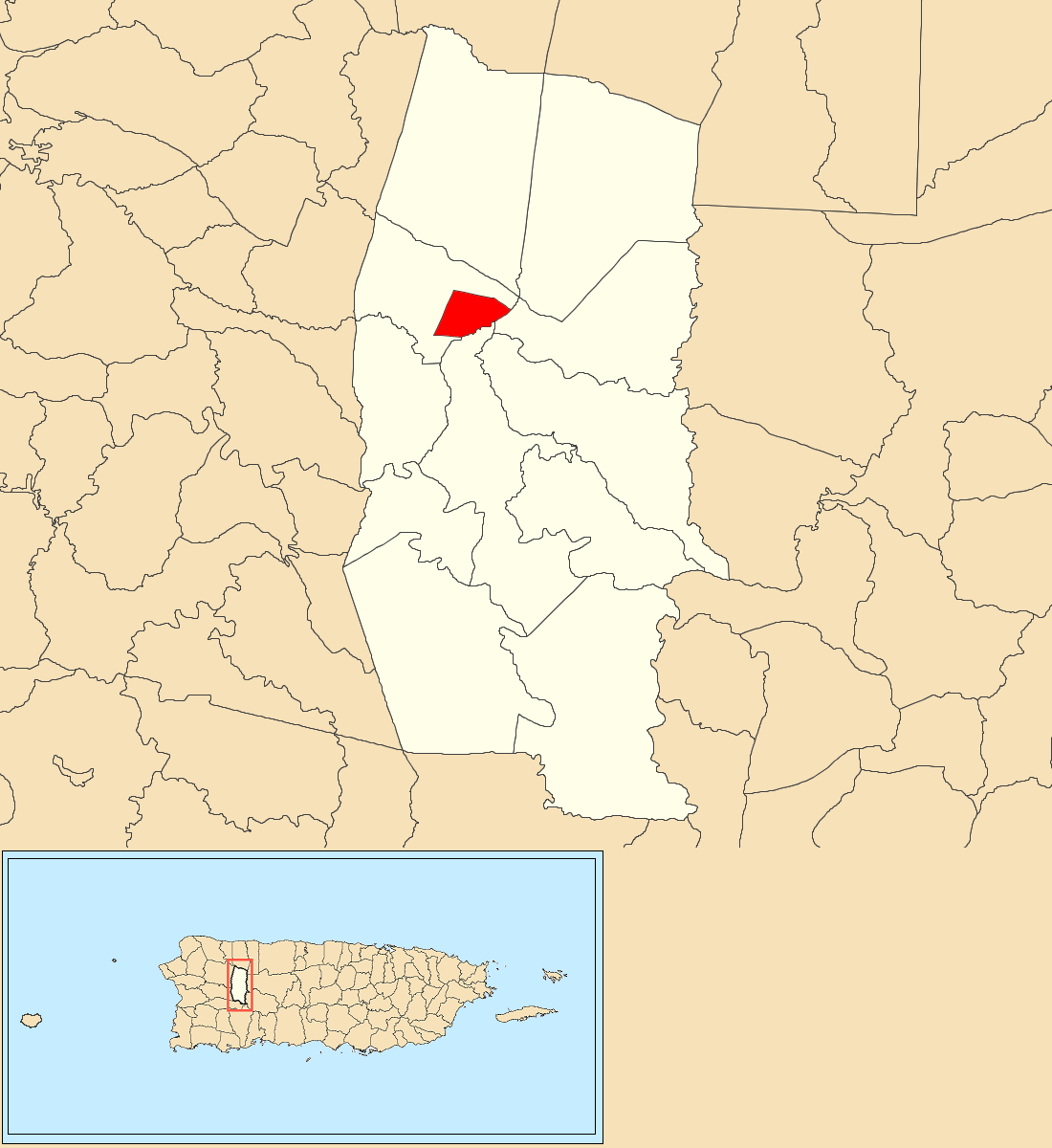
- Location of Lares barrio-pueblo within the municipality of Lares shown in red

- Location of Puerto Rico
- Coordinates: 18°17′46″N 66°52′53″W
- Commonwealth: Puerto Rico
- Municipality: Lares

Area
  - Total: 0.58 sq mi (1.5 km^{2})
  - Land: 0.58 sq mi (1.5 km^{2})
  - Water: 0 sq mi (0 km^{2})
- Elevation: 1,109 ft (338 m)

Population (2010)
  - Total: 2,690
  - Density: 4,637.9/sq mi (1,790.7/km^{2})
- Source: 2010 Census
- Time zone: UTC−4 (AST)

Lares barrio-pueblo is a barrio and the administrative center (seat) of Lares, a municipality of Puerto Rico. Its population in 2010 was 2,690.

As was customary in Spain, in Puerto Rico, the municipality has a barrio called pueblo which contains a central plaza, the municipal buildings (city hall), and a Catholic church. Fiestas patronales (patron saint festivals) are held in the central plaza every year.

== The central plaza and its church ==
Plaza de la Revolución is the name of the central plaza located in Lares Barrio Pueblo. The central plaza, or square, is a place for official and unofficial recreational events and a place where people can gather and socialize from dusk to dawn. The Laws of the Indies, Spanish law, which regulated life in Puerto Rico in the early 19th century, stated the plaza's purpose was for "the parties" (celebrations, festivities) (Spanish: a propósito para las fiestas), and that the square should be proportionally large enough for the number of neighbors (Spanish: grandeza proporcionada al número de vecinos). These Spanish regulations also stated that the streets nearby should be comfortable portals for passersby, protecting them from the elements: sun and rain.

Located across the central plaza in Lares barrio-pueblo is the Parroquia San José (English: Church San José of Lares), a Roman Catholic church. Originally made of wood, it was inaugurated in 1838. In 1881, it was remade based on a design by Ramón Soler with stone masonry but with wooden towers and a wooden roof. Then in the 1920s it was remodeled again. The building has changed completely but the original lateral walls and the first level of its front facade also remain from the original.

== History ==
Lares barrio-pueblo was in Spain's gazetteers until Puerto Rico was ceded by Spain in the aftermath of the Spanish–American War under the terms of the Treaty of Paris of 1898 and became an unincorporated territory of the United States. In 1899, the United States Department of War conducted a census of Puerto Rico finding that the population of Lares Pueblo was 1,450.

Historical population
Census	Pop.	Note	%±
1900	1,450		—
1910	2,751		89.7%
1920	2,693		−2.1%
1930	3,040		12.9%
1940	4,302		41.5%
1950	3,836		−10.8%
1960	4,216		9.9%
1970	0		−100.0%
1980	3,246		—
1990	3,101		−4.5%
2000	3,673		18.4%
2010	2,690		−26.8%
U.S. Decennial Census; 1899 (shown as 1900) 1910-1930; 1930-1950 1980-2000 2010

== Sectors ==
Barrios (which are, in contemporary times, roughly comparable to minor civil divisions) and subbarrios, in turn, are further subdivided into smaller local populated place areas/units called sectores (sectors in English). The types of sectores may vary, from normally sector to urbanización to reparto to barriada to residencial, among others.

The following sectors are in Lares barrio-pueblo:

Aurelio Bernal, Barriada Arizona, Barriada Bajadero, Barriada San Felipe, Barriada Viera, Calle Aldarondo, Calle Echegaray, Calle El Peligro, Calle Emilio Castro Rodríguez, Calle Ermita, Calle Felipe Arana, Calle Hospital, Calle La Gallera, Calle Molino, Calle Muñoz Rivera, Calle Palmer, Calle Rafael Castro, Calle Raúl Gándara, Calle San José, Sector Barranco, Calle San Pablo, Calle Sócrates González, Calle Vilella, Calle Villa Independencia, Calle Virgilio Acevedo, Camino González, Camino Henrry Arana, Carretera Acueducto, Cerro Márquez, Condominio Lares Gardens, Dr. Pedro Albizu Campos, Edificio Parques Platinos, Edificio Terrazas El Peligro, El Leñero, Ensanche González, Ensanche Sur, Extensión Altamira, Población, Ramal 111 Interior, Ramal 111 Interior (Emisora), Residencial Dr. Francisco Seín, Sector Desvío, Sector Guajataca, Sector Jardín de la Pasión, Sector Jayal, Sector Jobos, Sector La Monserrate, Sector La Sierra, Sector Los Torres, Sector Mercedes Estades, Sector Monte Bello, Sector Punta Brava, Tramo Carretera 124, Urbanización Altamira, Urbanización Buena Vista Calle Lecaroz, Urbanización Buena Vista, Urbanización Jardines de Lares, Urbanización Monte Bello, Urbanización Villa Borinquen, and Urbanización Villa Seral.

== Gallery ==
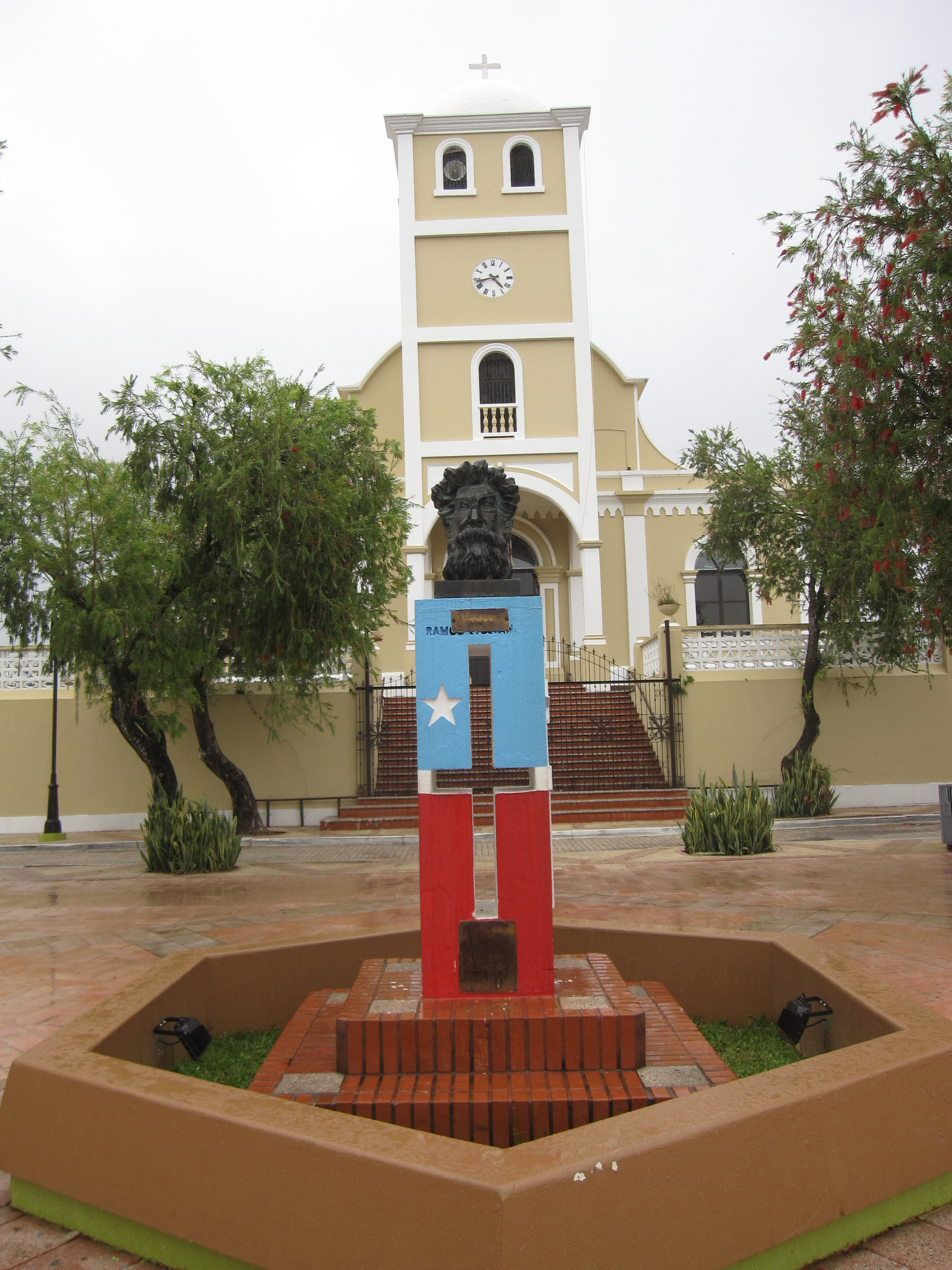
Church and monument, Plaza de la Revolución

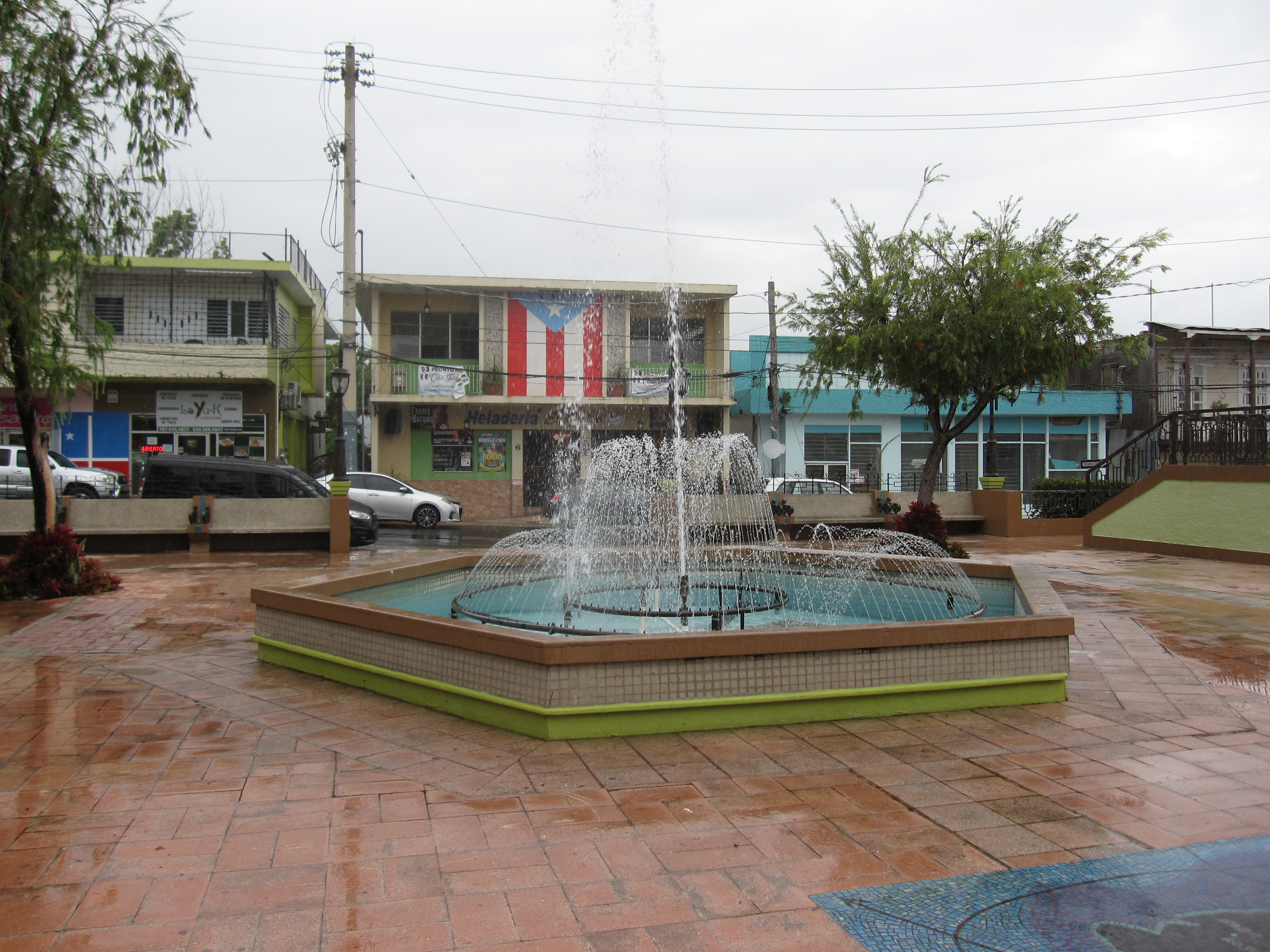
Fountain in Plaza de la Revolución

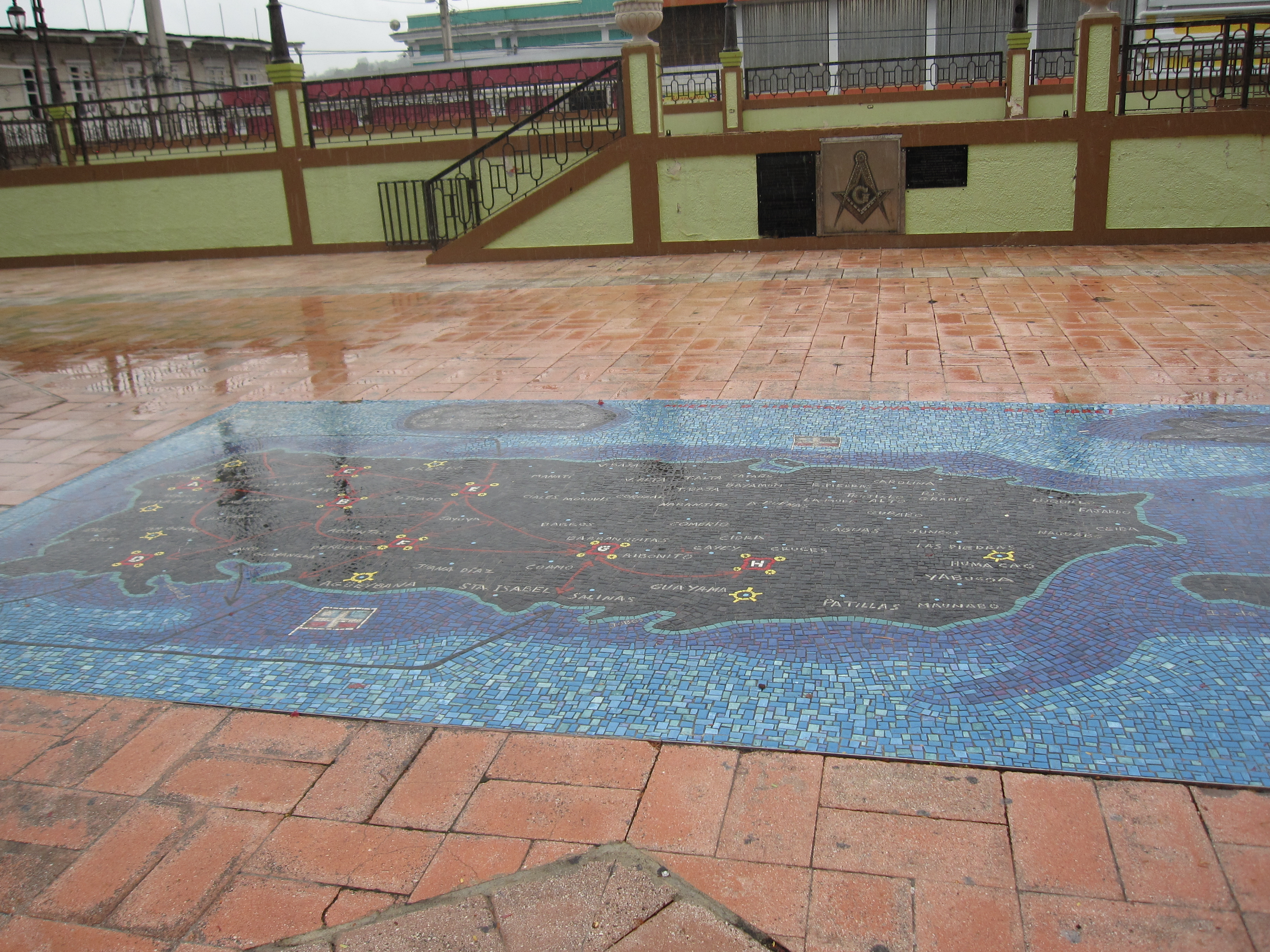
Map mosaic at Plaza de la Revolución

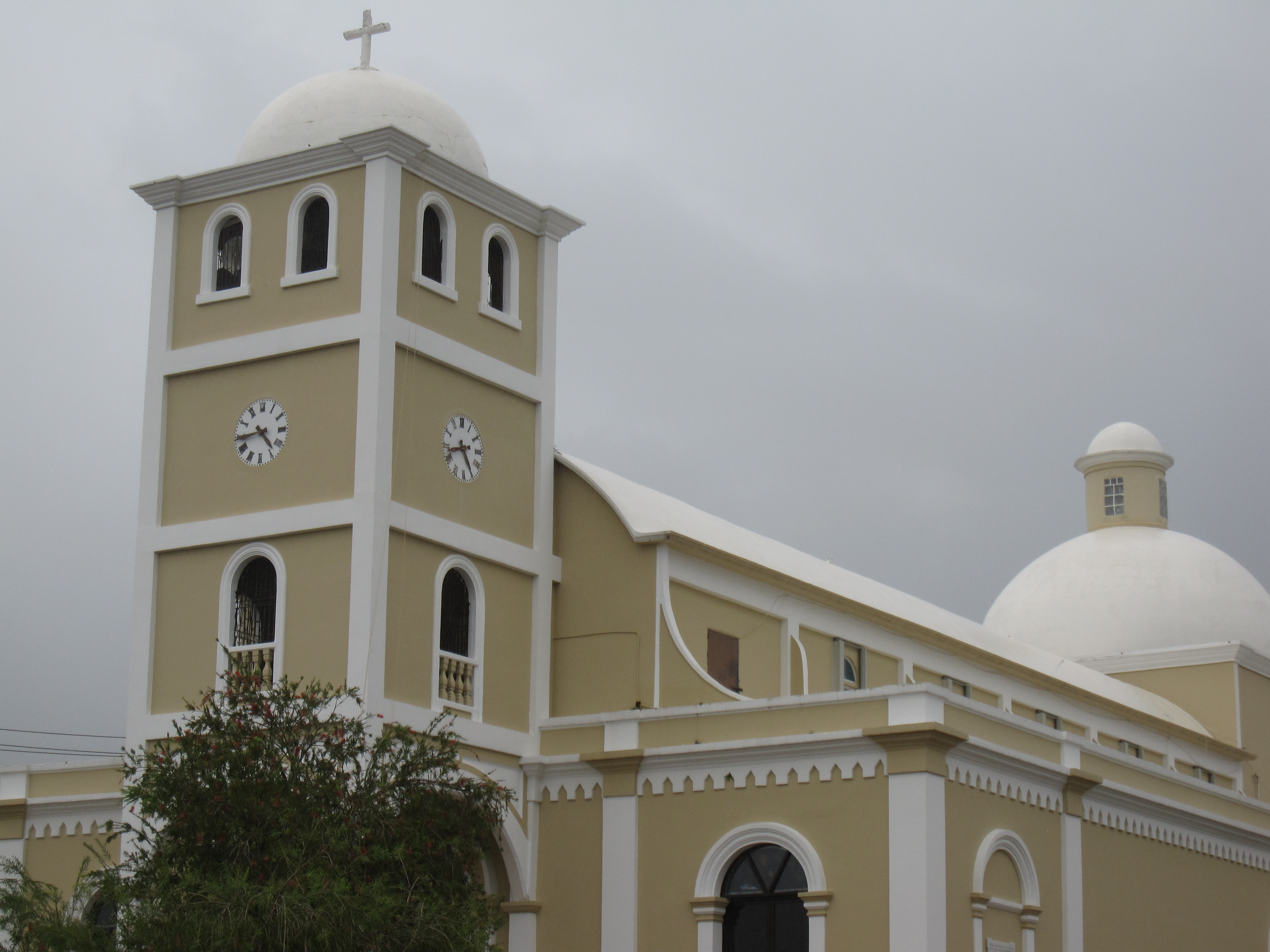
Catholic Church in Lares

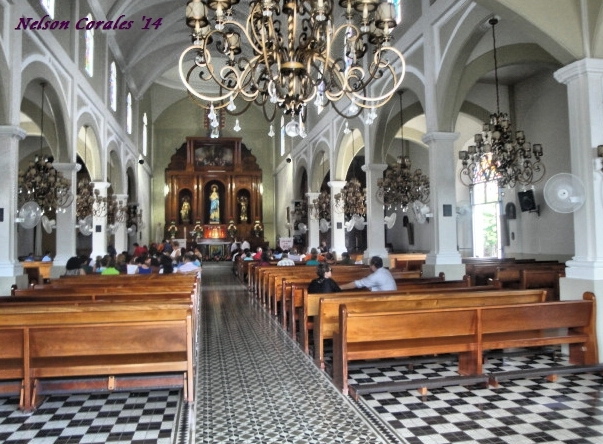
The church interior

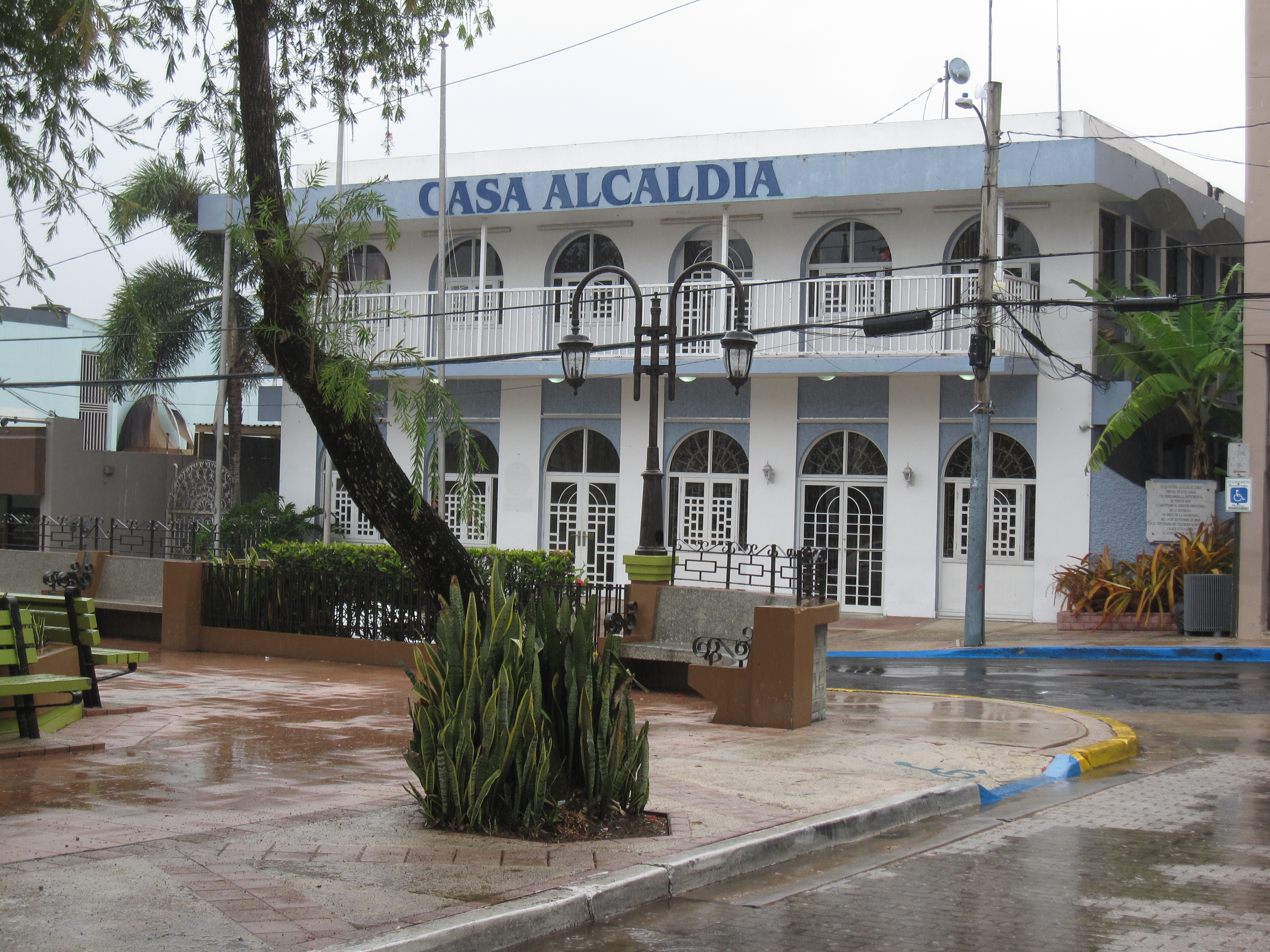
City Hall, 2019

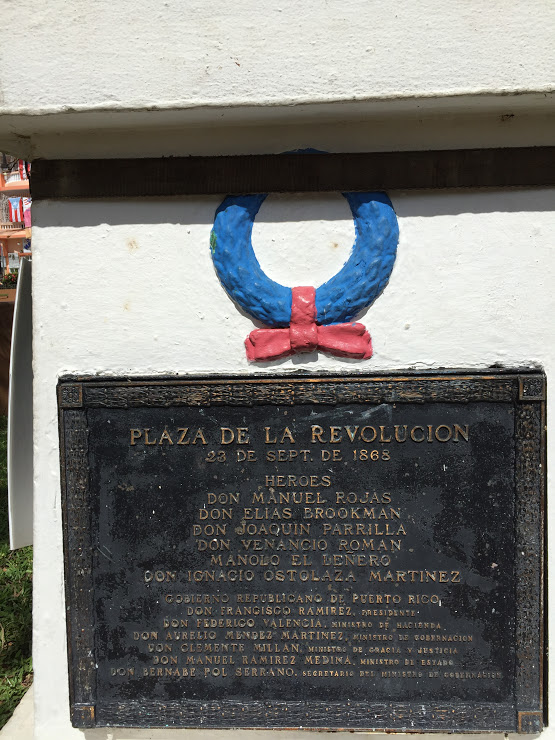
Plaque in Plaza de la Revolución

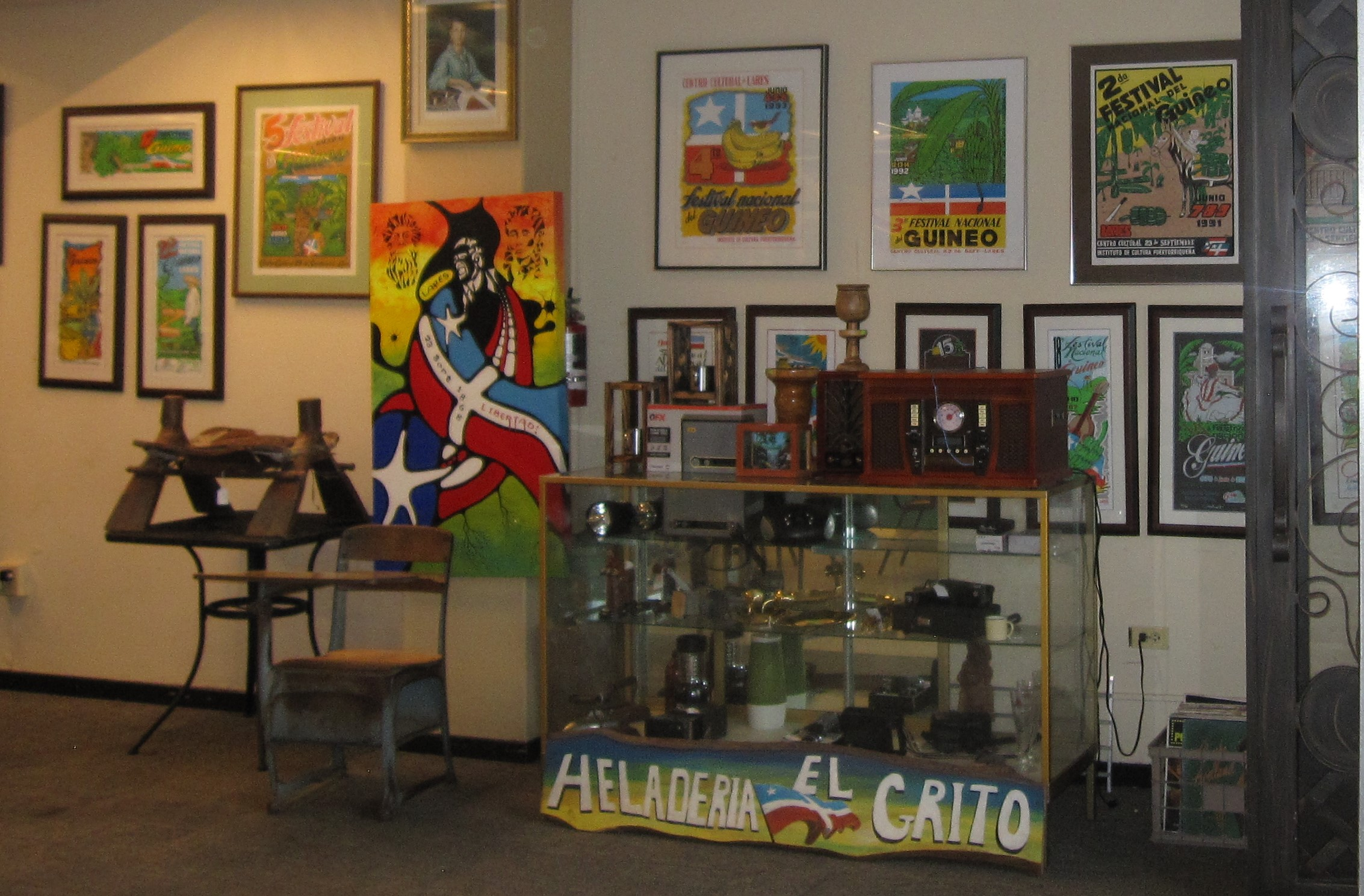
Ice cream shop Heladería El Grito owned by Jose Rodríguez Ruiz, mayor of Lares in 2020

== See also ==
- List of communities in Puerto Rico
- List of barrios and sectors of Lares, Puerto Rico
