= Espino, Lares, Puerto Rico =

Barrio of Puerto Rico

Espino
- Barrio
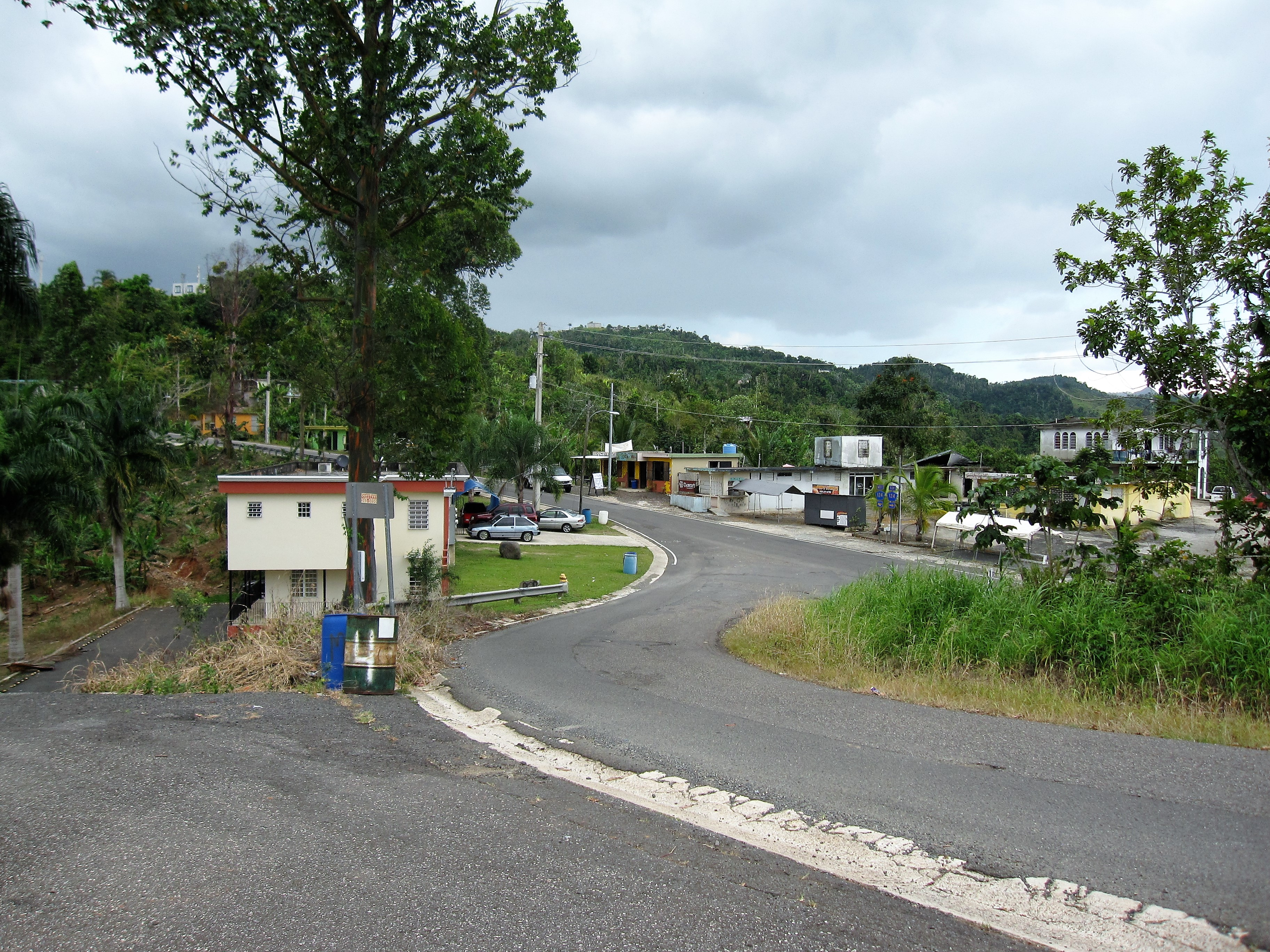
- PR-435 and PR-124 junction in Espino barrio

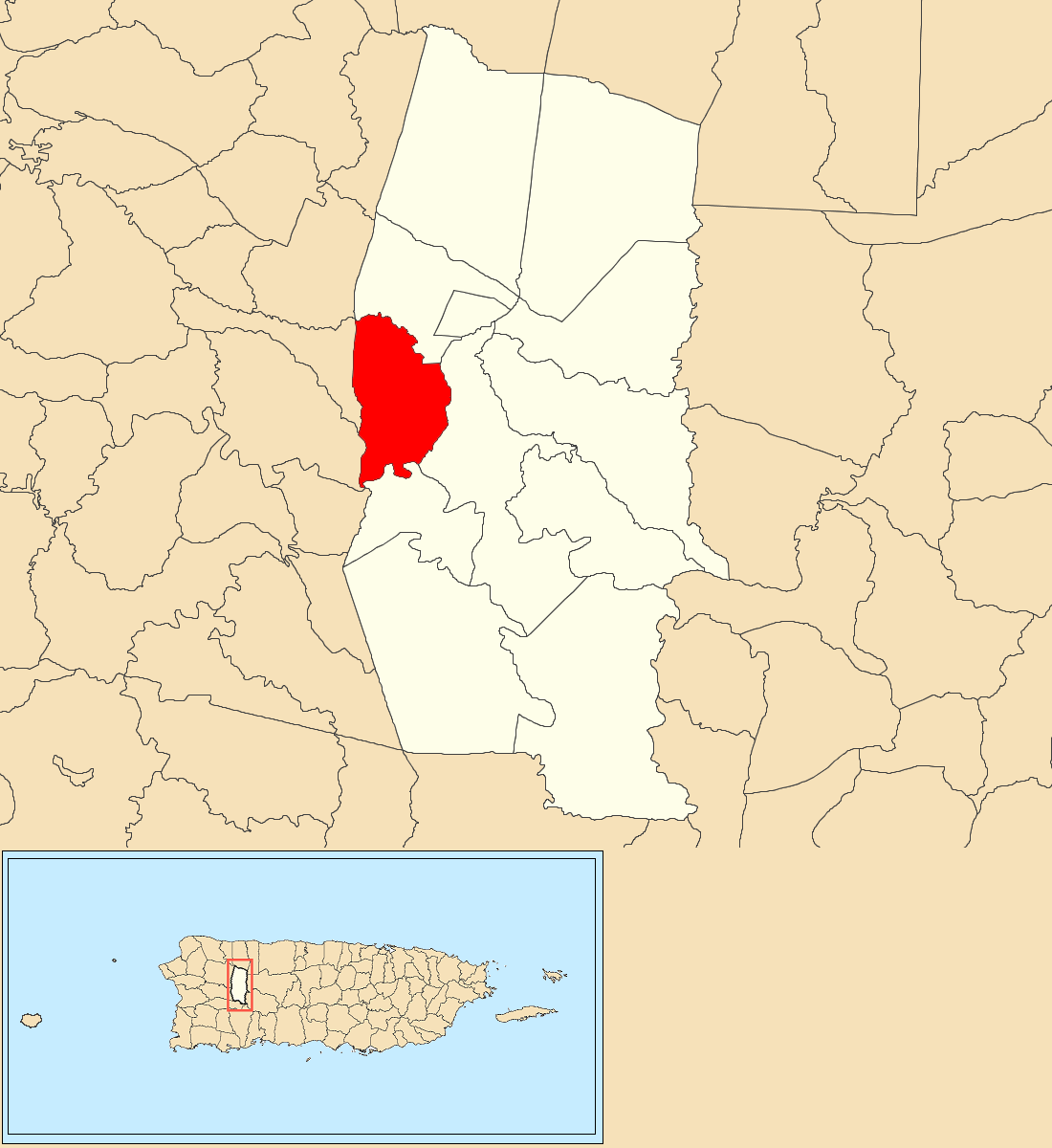
- Location of Espino barrio within the municipality of Lares shown in red

- Location within the Caribbean
- Coordinates: 18°16′31″N 66°53′59″W
- Commonwealth: Puerto Rico
- Municipality: Lares

Area
  - Total: 3.19 sq mi (8.3 km^{2})
  - Land: 3.19 sq mi (8.3 km^{2})
  - Water: 0 sq mi (0 km^{2})
- Elevation: 1,460 ft (450 m)

Population (2010)
  - Total: 1,695
  - Density: 531.3/sq mi (205.1/km^{2})
- Source: 2010 Census
- Time zone: UTC−4 (AST)

Espino is a barrio in the municipality of Lares, Puerto Rico. Its population in 2010 was 1,695.

== History ==
Espino was in Spain's gazetteers until Puerto Rico was ceded by Spain in the aftermath of the Spanish–American War under the terms of the Treaty of Paris of 1898 and became an unincorporated territory of the United States. In 1899, the United States Department of War conducted a census of Puerto Rico finding that the population of Espino barrio was 1,148.

Historical population
Census	Pop.	Note	%±
1900	1,148		—
1910	1,199		4.4%
1920	1,117		−6.8%
1930	1,298		16.2%
1940	1,210		−6.8%
1950	1,454		20.2%
1960	1,481		1.9%
1970	1,407		−5.0%
1980	1,638		16.4%
1990	1,591		−2.9%
2000	1,932		21.4%
2010	1,695		−12.3%
U.S. Decennial Census; 1899 (shown as 1900) 1910-1930; 1930-1950 1980-2000 2010

== Sectors ==
Barrios (which are, in contemporary times, roughly comparable to minor civil divisions) and subbarrios, in turn, are further subdivided into smaller local populated place areas/units called sectores (sectors in English). The types of sectores may vary, from normally sector to urbanización to reparto to barriada to residencial, among others.

The following sectors are in Espino barrio:

Arco Iris, Berrocal, Camino Caballito, Camino David González, Camino Emau, Camino Herminio Hernández, Camino Julito Nieves, Carmelo Mercado, Copa de Oro, Demetrio Otaño, El Maná, Las Lajas, Los Adames, Los Chayotes, Los Luciano, Los Otaño, Parcelas Tabonuco, Sector Ceiba, Sector Cheíto Vega, Sector Justo Malo, Sector La Cabaña, Sector Mameyes, Sector Milito Méndez, Sector Oliver, Sector Raty Guivas, Sector Tellado, Sector Toño Vega, Sector Trofy Lares, Tramo Carretera 124 (Lado este desde la Ferretería Los Muchachos hasta la residencia del señor Juanma Collazo), Tramo Carretera 124 (Parte oeste desde el negocio Rincón de los Trovadores hasta el Garage de Pepito Collazo), Tramo Carretera 436, and Urbanización Brisas de Lares.

== Gallery ==
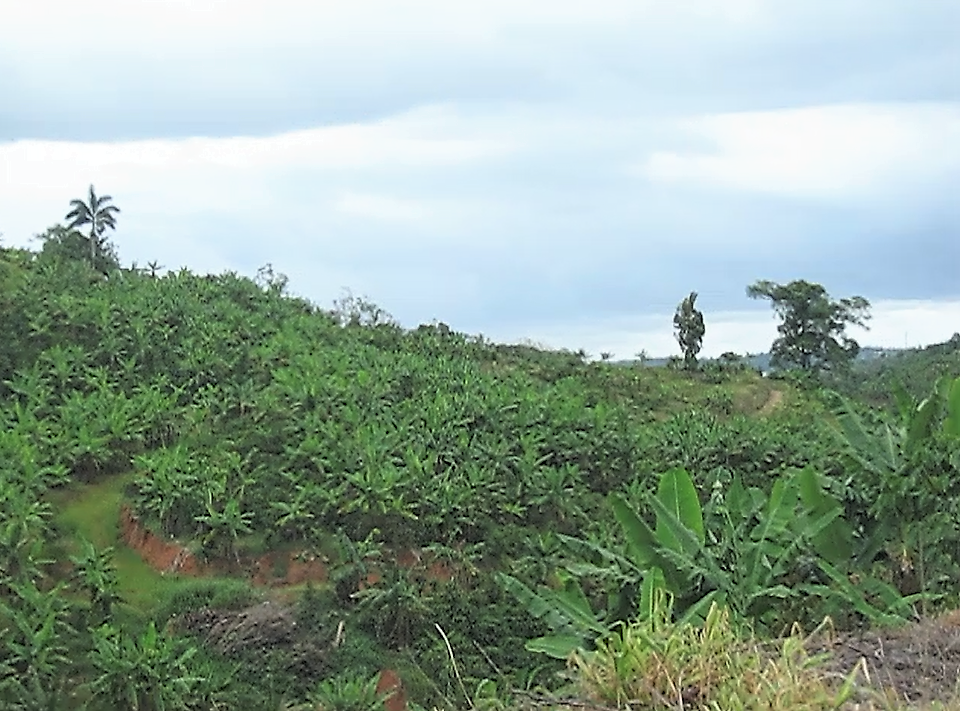
Vegetation in Espino barrio, Lares; view from PR-435 near PR-124 junction.

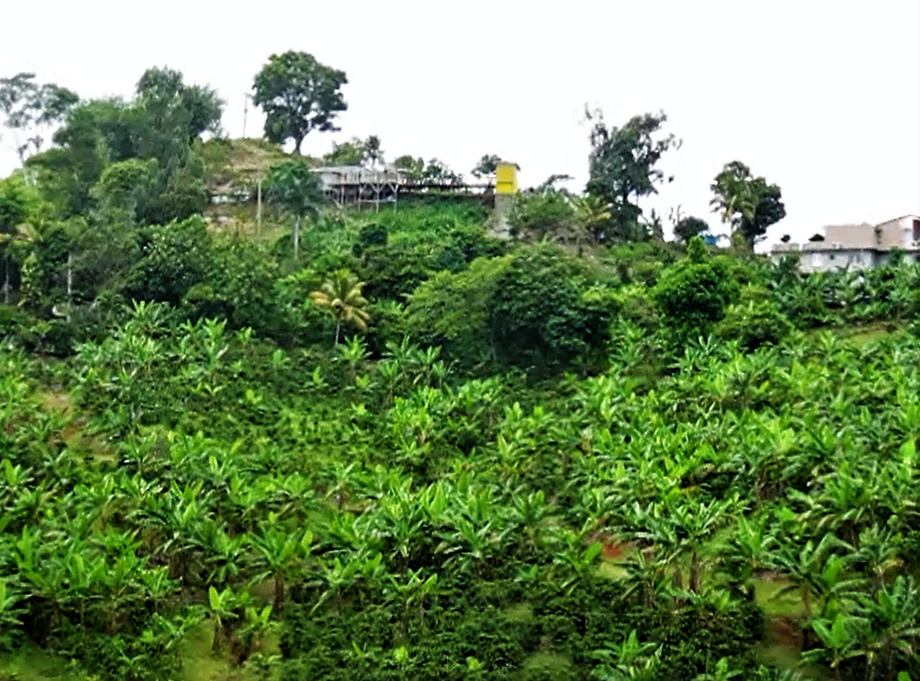
Homes in Espino barrio, Lares; view from PR-435 near PR-124 junction.

== See also ==
- List of communities in Puerto Rico
- List of barrios and sectors of Lares, Puerto Rico
