= Pezuela =

Barrio of Lares, Puerto Rico

Pezuela Pesuela
- Barrio
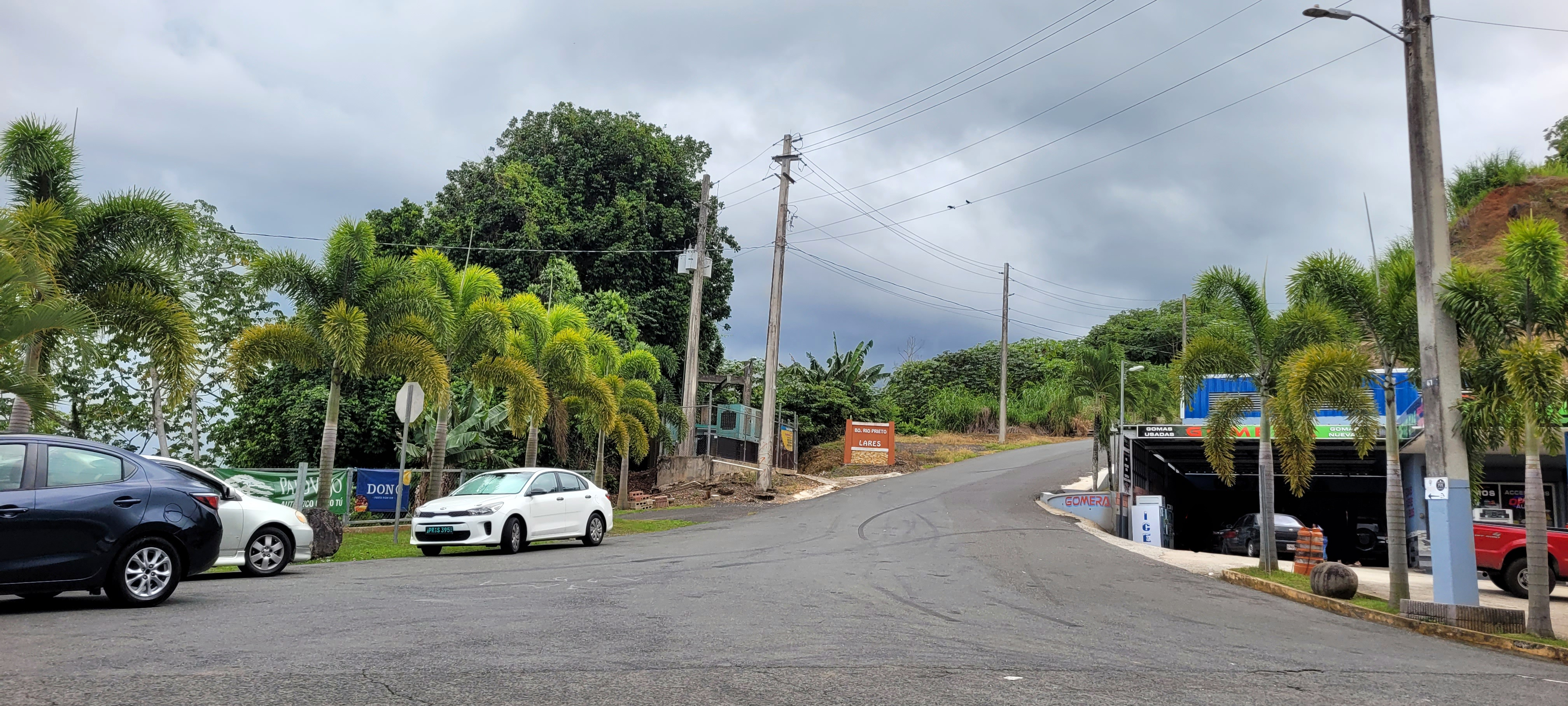
- Puerto Rico Highway 4431 between Pezuela and Río Prieto

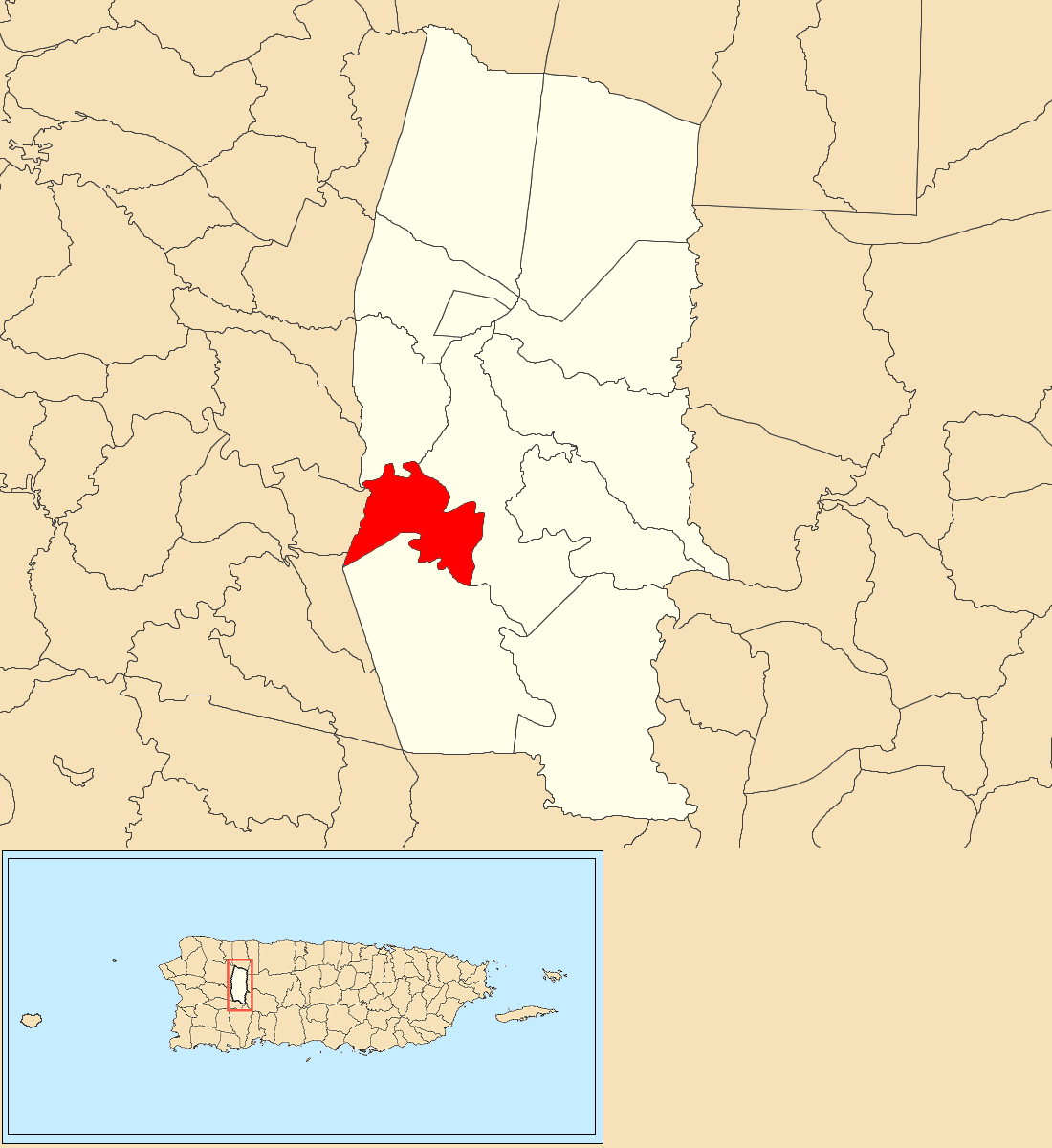
- Location of Pezuela barrio within the municipality of Lares shown in red

- Location of Puerto Rico
- Coordinates: 18°14′38″N 66°54′01″W
- Commonwealth: Puerto Rico
- Municipality: Lares

Area
  - Total: 2.42 sq mi (6.3 km^{2})
  - Land: 2.42 sq mi (6.3 km^{2})
  - Water: 0 sq mi (0 km^{2})
- Elevation: 787 ft (240 m)

Population (2010)
  - Total: 474
  - Density: 195.9/sq mi (75.6/km^{2})
- Source: 2010 Census
- Time zone: UTC−4 (AST)

Pezuela is a barrio in the municipality of Lares, Puerto Rico. Its population in 2010 was 474. The barrio is divided into about 8 sectors. The barrio has been prone to landslides since Hurricane Maria struck in 2017.

== History ==
Pezuela was in Spain's gazetteers until Puerto Rico was ceded by Spain in the aftermath of the Spanish–American War under the terms of the Treaty of Paris of 1898 and became an unincorporated territory of the United States. In 1899, the United States Department of War conducted a census of Puerto Rico finding that the population of Pezuela barrio was 1,010.

Historical population
Census	Pop.	Note	%±
1900	1,010		—
1910	1,159		14.8%
1920	1,409		21.6%
1930	1,393		−1.1%
1940	1,241		−10.9%
1950	710		−42.8%
1960	746		5.1%
1970	415		−44.4%
1980	488		17.6%
1990	398		−18.4%
2000	272		−31.7%
2010	474		74.3%
U.S. Decennial Census; 1899 (shown as 1900) 1910-1930; 1930-1950 1980-2000 2010

In late 2019, 12 landslides occurred in one month's time as a result of heavy rainfall and some homes were in danger of collapsing near PR-131. Residents stated the problem was caused by years of inaction to correct and clear waterways after Hurricane Maria, which struck in 2017. The people fear that a large landslide could occur and cause many deaths as happened with the Mameyes Landslide in Portugués Urbano barrio in Ponce in 1985.

== Sectors ==
Barrios (which are, in contemporary times, roughly comparable to minor civil divisions) and subbarrios, in turn, are further subdivided into smaller local populated place areas/units called sectores (sectors in English). The types of sectores may vary, from normally sector to urbanización to reparto to barriada to residencial, among others.

The following sectors are in Pezuela barrio:

Hacienda Marrero, Hacienda Rojas, Hacienda Vilella, La Vega de los Acevedo, Maguelles, Sector Ezenelías, Sector Sisco, and Tramo Carretera 431.

== See also ==
- List of communities in Puerto Rico
- List of barrios and sectors of Lares, Puerto Rico
