= Pueblo, Lares, Puerto Rico =

Barrio of Puerto Rico

Pueblo
- Barrio
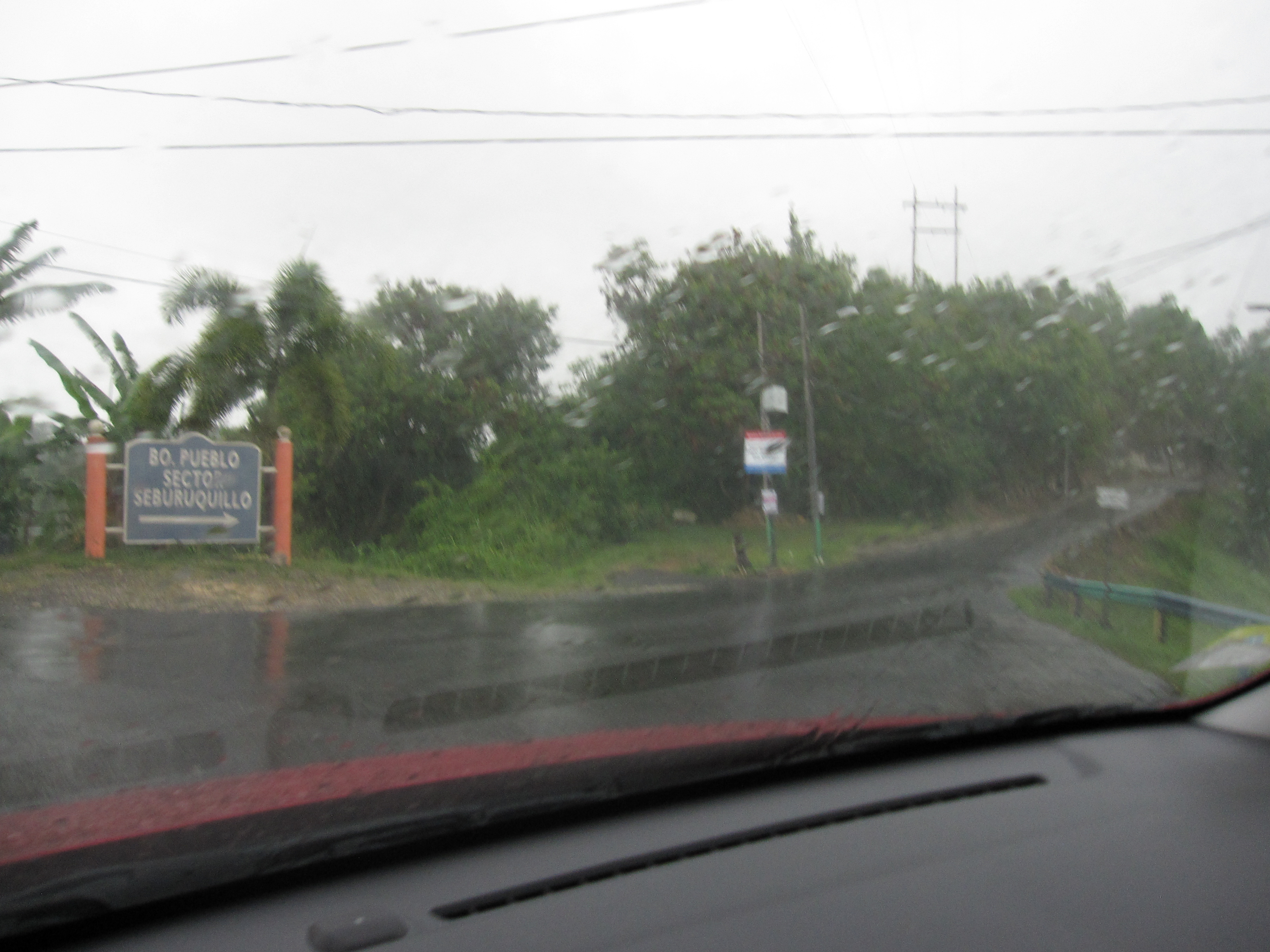
- Sector Seburuquillo on PR-111 in Pueblo

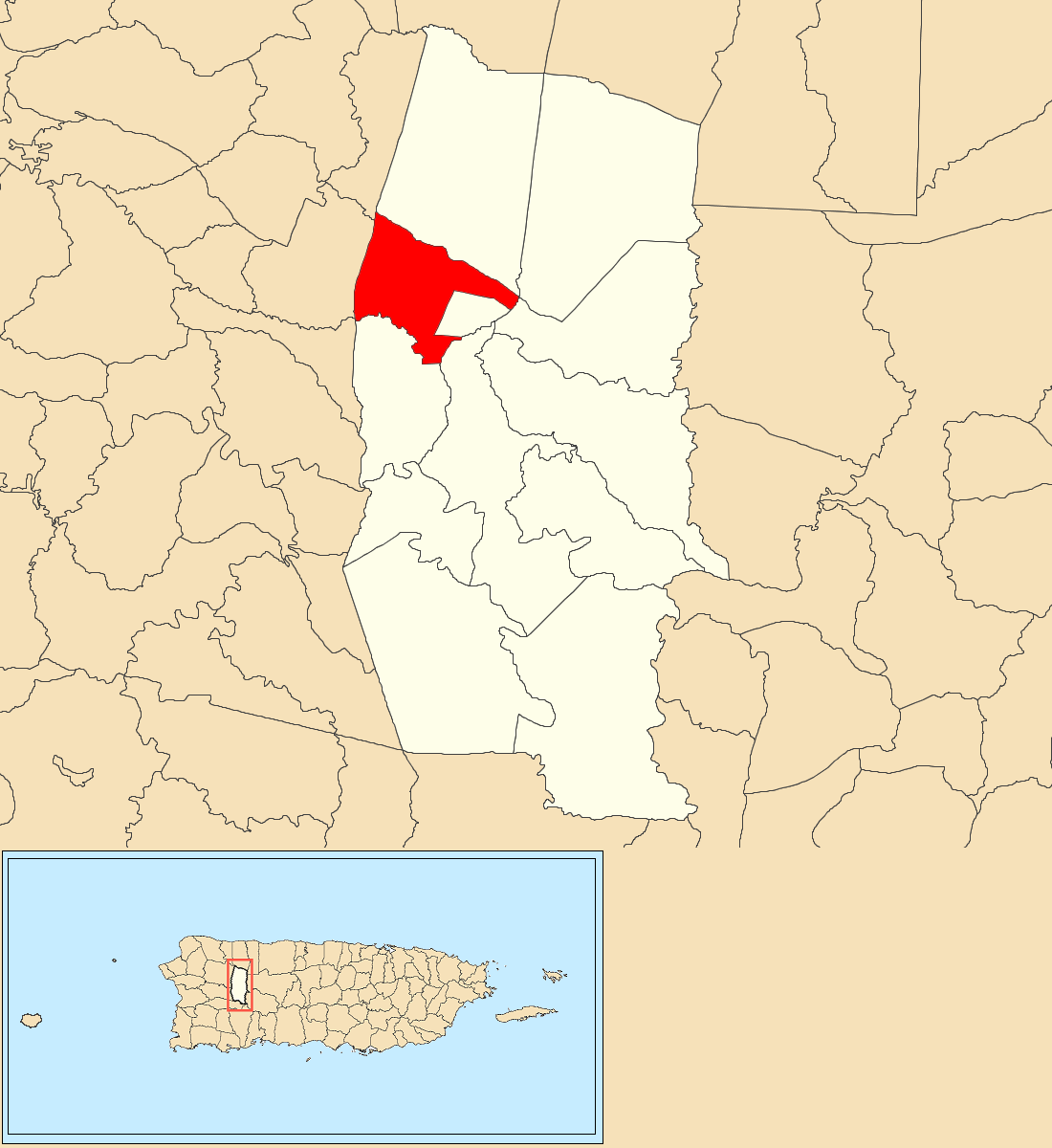
- Location of Pueblo barrio within the municipality of Lares shown in red

- Location of Puerto Rico
- Coordinates: 18°18′09″N 66°53′46″W
- Commonwealth: Puerto Rico
- Municipality: Lares

Area
  - Total: 2.95 sq mi (7.6 km^{2})
  - Land: 2.95 sq mi (7.6 km^{2})
  - Water: 0 sq mi (0 km^{2})
- Elevation: 1,175 ft (358 m)

Population (2010)
  - Total: 4,838
  - Density: 1,640/sq mi (630/km^{2})
- Source: 2010 Census
- Time zone: UTC−4 (AST)

Pueblo is a barrio in the municipality of Lares, Puerto Rico. Its population in 2010 was 4,838.

Historical population
Census	Pop.	Note	%±
1910	1,575		—
1920	1,669		6.0%
1930	3,090		85.1%
1940	2,430		−21.4%
1950	2,501		2.9%
1960	2,459		−1.7%
1970	0		−100.0%
1980	3,430		—
1990	4,269		24.5%
2000	5,830		36.6%
2010	4,838		−17.0%
U.S. Decennial Census; 1899 (shown as 1900) 1910-1930; 1930-1950 1980-2000 2010

== Sectors ==
Barrios (which are, in contemporary times, roughly comparable to minor civil divisions) and subbarrios, in turn, are further subdivided into smaller local populated place areas/units called sectores (sectors in English). The types of sectores may vary, from normally sector to urbanización to reparto to barriada to residencial, among others.

The following sectors are in Pueblo barrio:

Avenida Los Patriotas, Hacienda Borinquen, Sector Ballajá, Sector Barranco, Sector La Cuadra, Sector La Piedra, Sector La Pluma, Sector Seburuquillo, Tramo Carretera 111, Urbanización Alturas de Borinquen, Urbanización Campo Alegre, and Urbanización Palmas del Sol.

Sector Seburuquillo waited nearly three weeks to receive aid after Hurricane Maria destroyed infrastructure, leaving 80 families incommunicado and without food and water.

== See also ==
- List of communities in Puerto Rico
- List of barrios and sectors of Lares, Puerto Rico
