= Cerrote =

Barrio of Las Marías, Puerto Rico

- Barrio
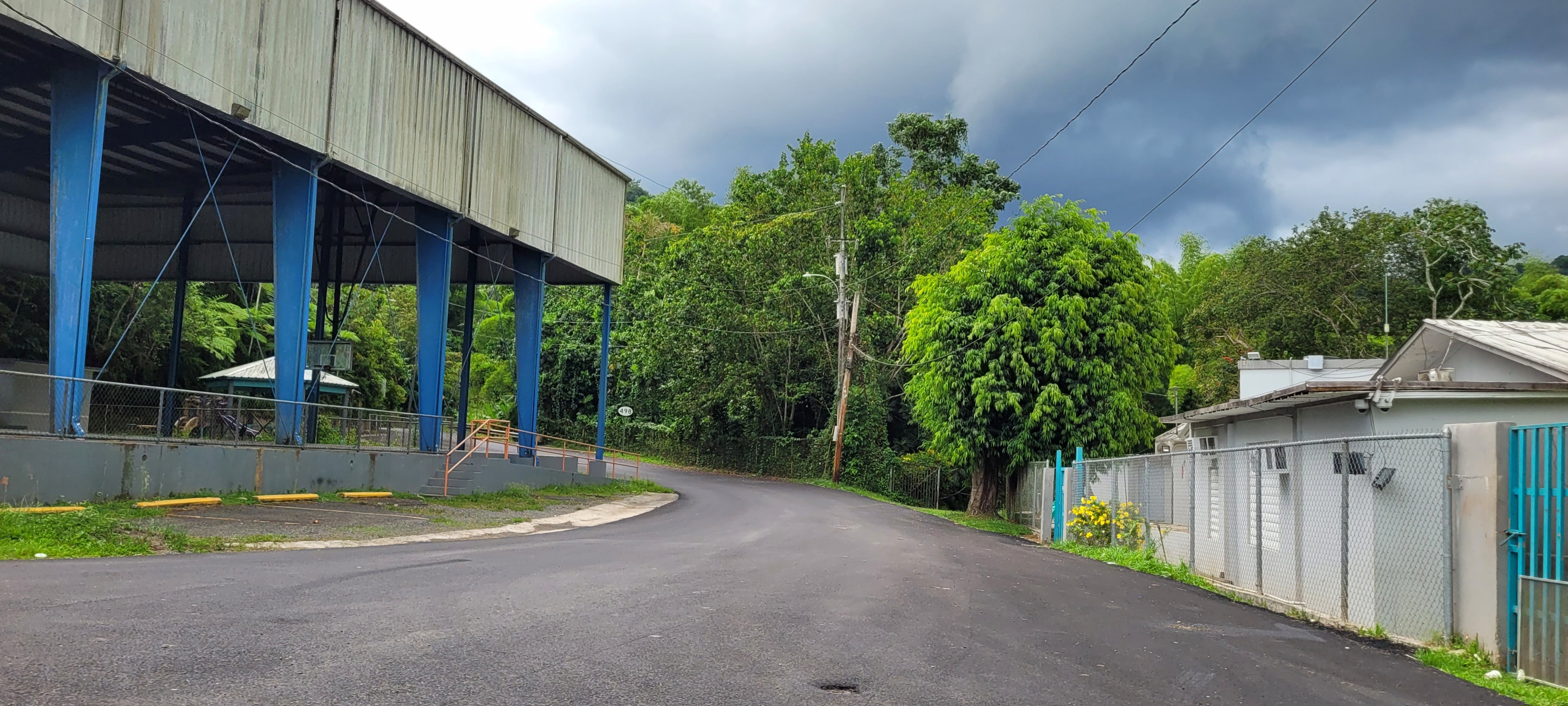
- Puerto Rico Highway 498 in Cerrote

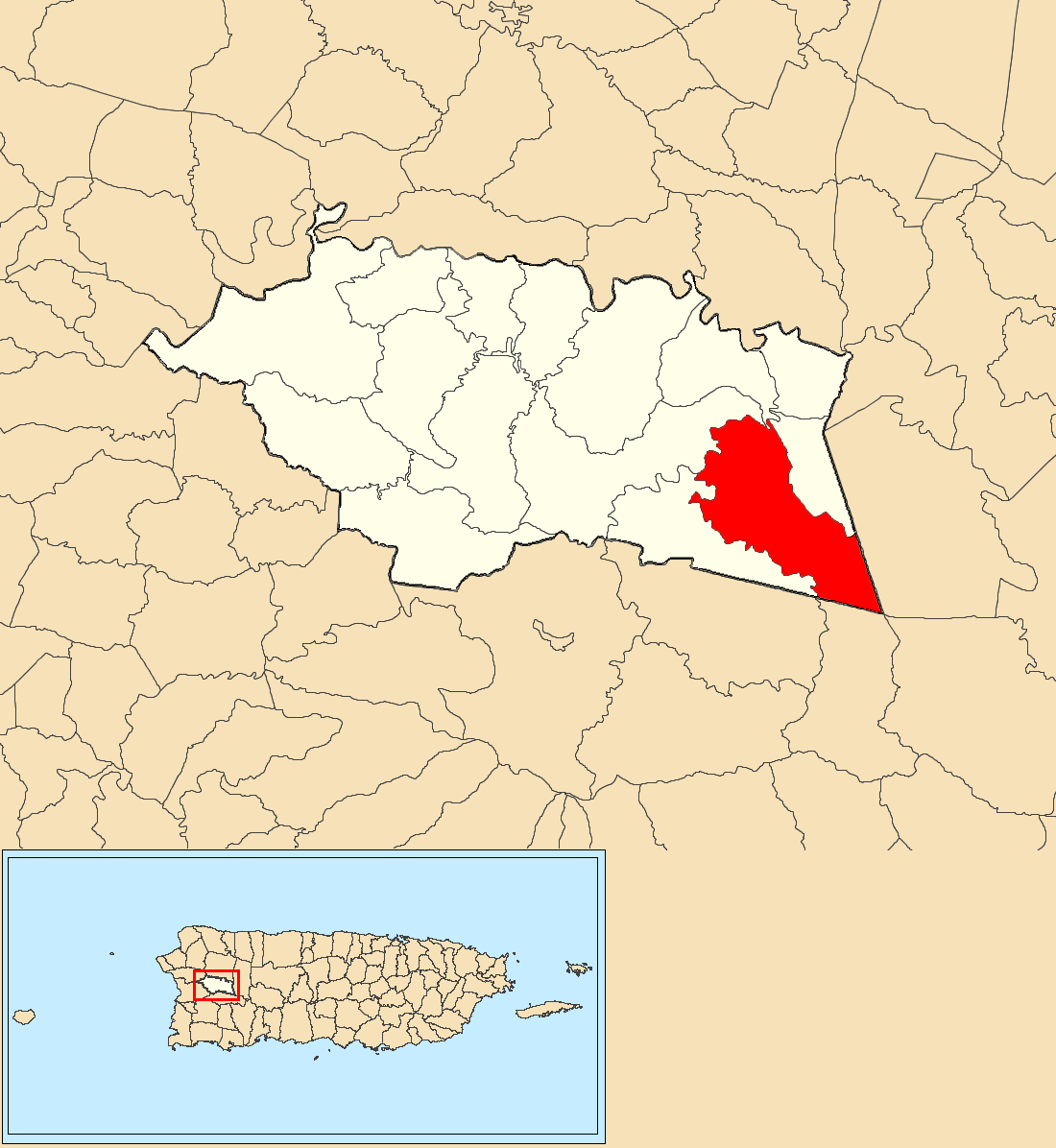
- Location of Cerrote within the municipality of Las Marías shown in red

- Location of Puerto Rico
- Coordinates: 18°12′45″N 66°55′25″W
- Commonwealth: Puerto Rico
- Municipality: Las Marías

Area
  - Total: 4.48 sq mi (11.6 km^{2})
  - Land: 4.48 sq mi (11.6 km^{2})
  - Water: 0 sq mi (0 km^{2})
- Elevation: 1,211 ft (369 m)

Population (2010)
  - Total: 496
  - Density: 110.7/sq mi (42.7/km^{2})
- Source: 2010 Census
- Time zone: UTC−4 (AST)

Cerrote Barrio is a barrio in the municipality of Las Marías, Puerto Rico. Its population in 2010 was 496.

== History ==
Cerrote was in Spain's gazetteers until Puerto Rico was ceded by Spain in the aftermath of the Spanish–American War under the terms of the Treaty of Paris of 1898 and became an unincorporated territory of the United States. In 1899, the United States Department of War conducted a census of Puerto Rico finding that the population of Cerrote barrio was 864.

Historical population
Census	Pop.	Note	%±
1900	864		—
1910	1,056		22.2%
1920	1,262		19.5%
1930	884		−30.0%
1940	1,000		13.1%
1950	1,035		3.5%
1960	979		−5.4%
1970	594		−39.3%
1980	781		31.5%
1990	734		−6.0%
2000	612		−16.6%
2010	496		−19.0%
U.S. Decennial Census; 1899 (shown as 1900) 1910-1930; 1930-1950 1980-2000 2010

== Sectors ==
Barrios (which are, in contemporary times, roughly comparable to minor civil divisions) in turn are further subdivided into smaller local populated place areas/units called sectores (sectors in English). The types of sectores may vary, from normally sector to urbanización to reparto to barriada to residencial, among others.

The following sectors are in Cerrote barrio:

Sector Bryan, Sector Casanova, Sector Guaba, Sector Justiniano, Sector Laguna, and Sector Miraflores.

== See also ==
- List of communities in Puerto Rico
- List of barrios and sectors of Las Marías, Puerto Rico
