= Puerto Rico Highway 129 =

Highway in Puerto Rico

Highway 129
- Ruta 129

Route information
- Maintained by Puerto Rico DTPW
- Length: 43.2 km (26.8 mi)
- Existed: 1953–present

Major junctions
- South end: PR-135 in Yahuecas
- PR-111 in Lares; PR-453 in Piletas; PR-455 in Quebrada; PR-134 in Bayaney; PR-134 in Campo Alegre; PR-130 in Campo Alegre; PR-635 in Campo Alegre; PR-22 in Hato Abajo; PR-651 in Hato Abajo–Arecibo barrio-pueblo; PR-653 in Arecibo barrio-pueblo–Hato Abajo
- North end: PR-2 in Arecibo barrio-pueblo

Location
- Country: United States
- Territory: Puerto Rico
- Municipalities: Adjuntas, Utuado, Lares, Camuy, Hatillo, Arecibo

Highway system
- Roads in Puerto Rico; List
← PR-128	→ PR-130

Puerto Rico Highway 129 (PR-129) is a north–south (actually diagonal) highway in North-Central Puerto Rico, connecting the town of Lares with Arecibo. It crosses the northern karst country of the island. When traveling from the northern coast of Puerto Rico, PR-129 can be used to reach the Arecibo Observatory and the Camuy River Caverns Park.

== Route description ==
It is a four-lane, divided highway in Arecibo, and a super two highway in Hatillo, Camuy and Lares. It then merges with PR-111, being entirely unsigned throughout this section. It then heads south as a narrow, rural road, and ends at PR-135 near Adjuntas. Its speed limit is overall 45 miles per hour (72 km/h) through its highway section. It was originally a narrow, two lane road. Much of the original alignment is now PR-134.

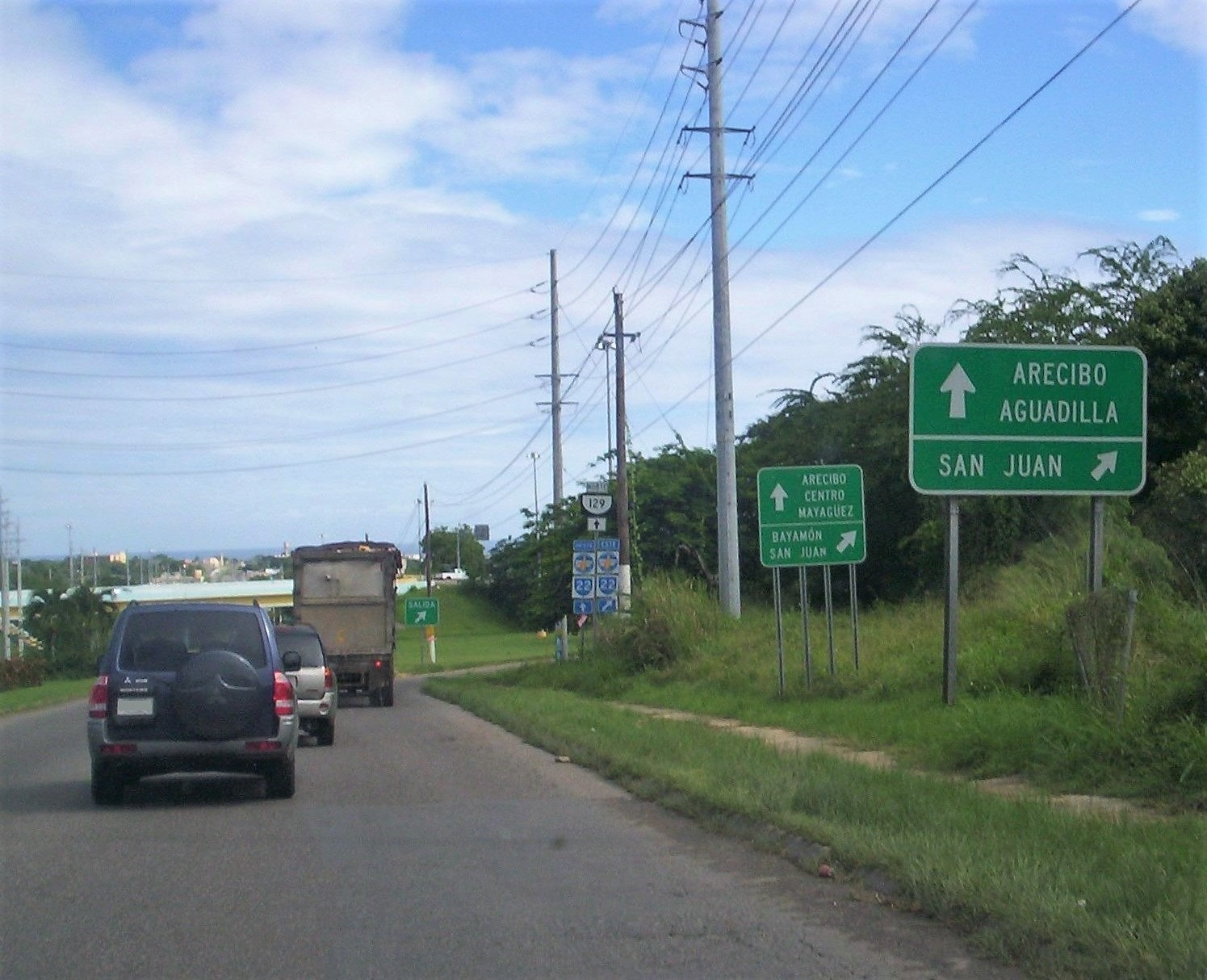
PR-129 north near the interchange with PR-22 in Hato Abajo, Arecibo

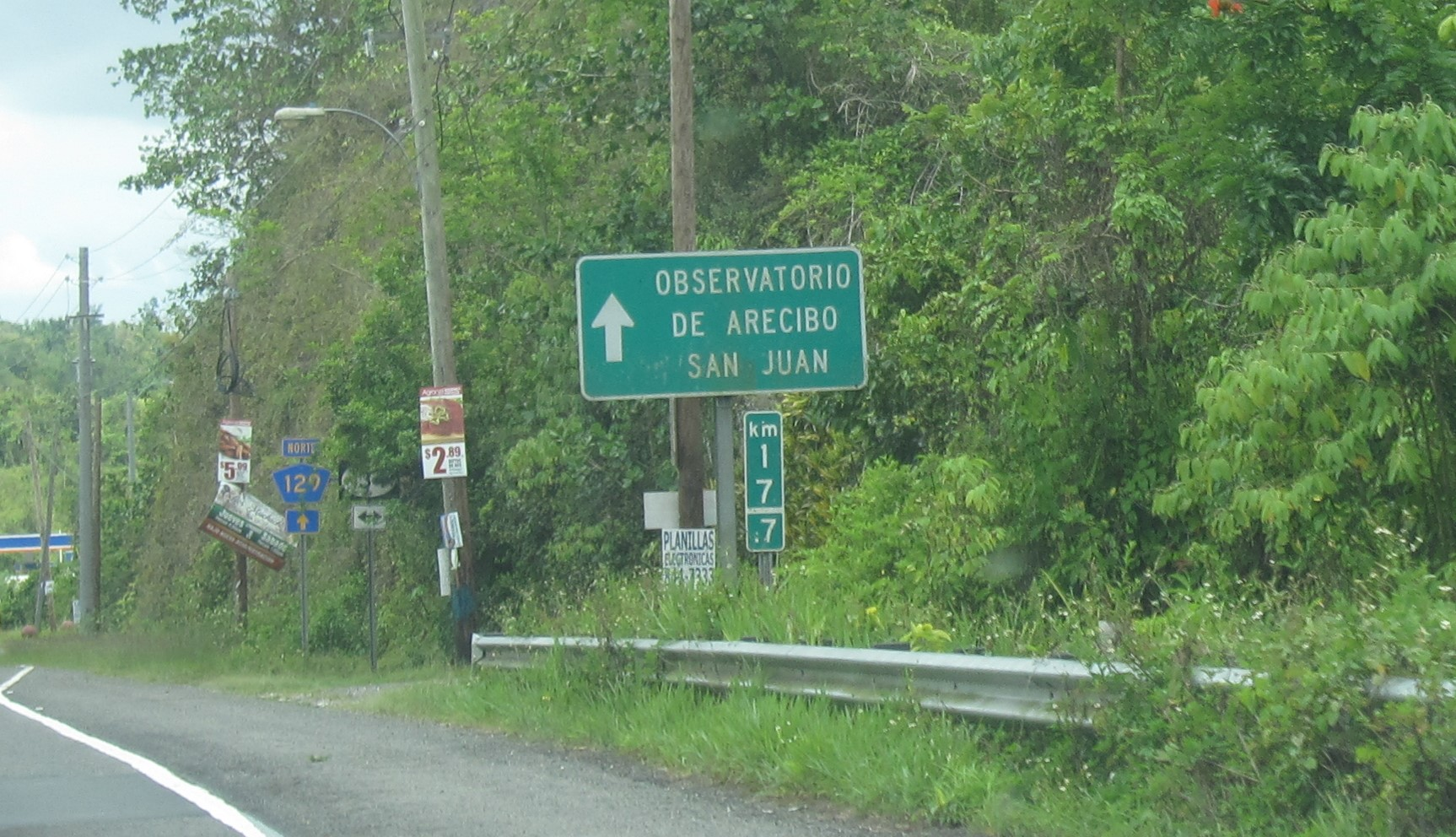
Sign for Arecibo Observatory from PR-129 north

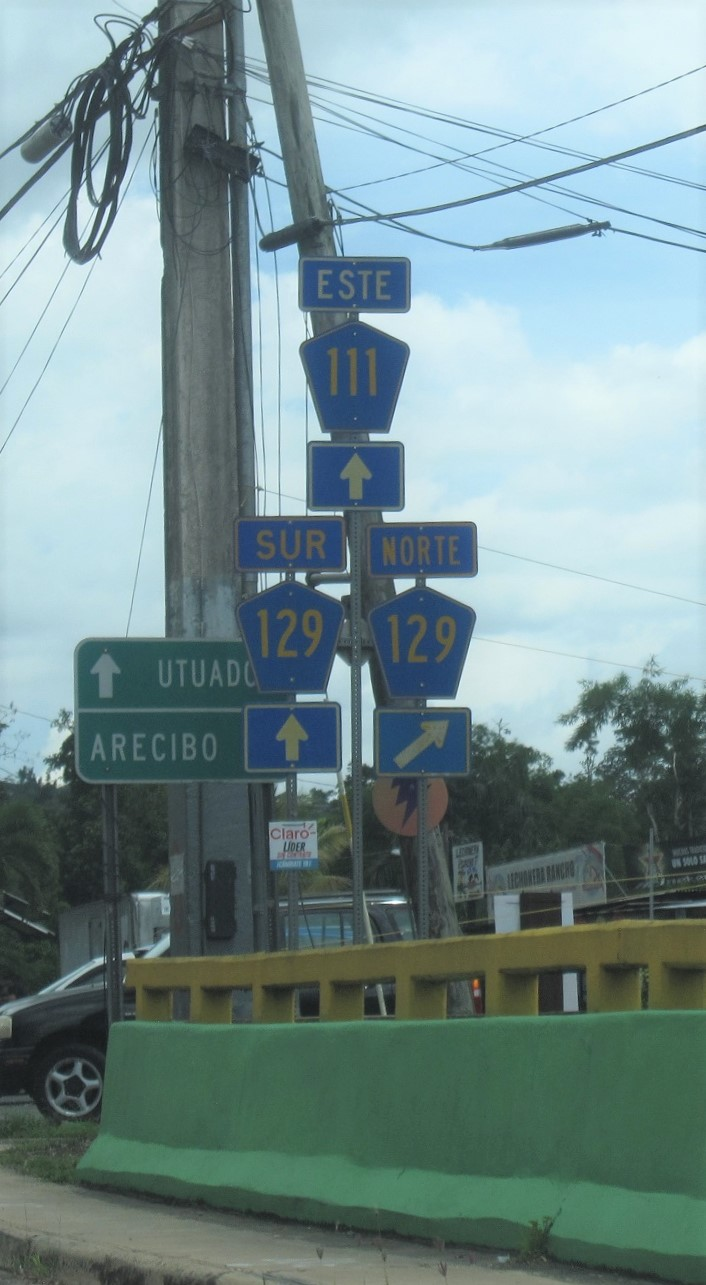
PR-111 and PR-129 junction in Lares

== Major intersections ==
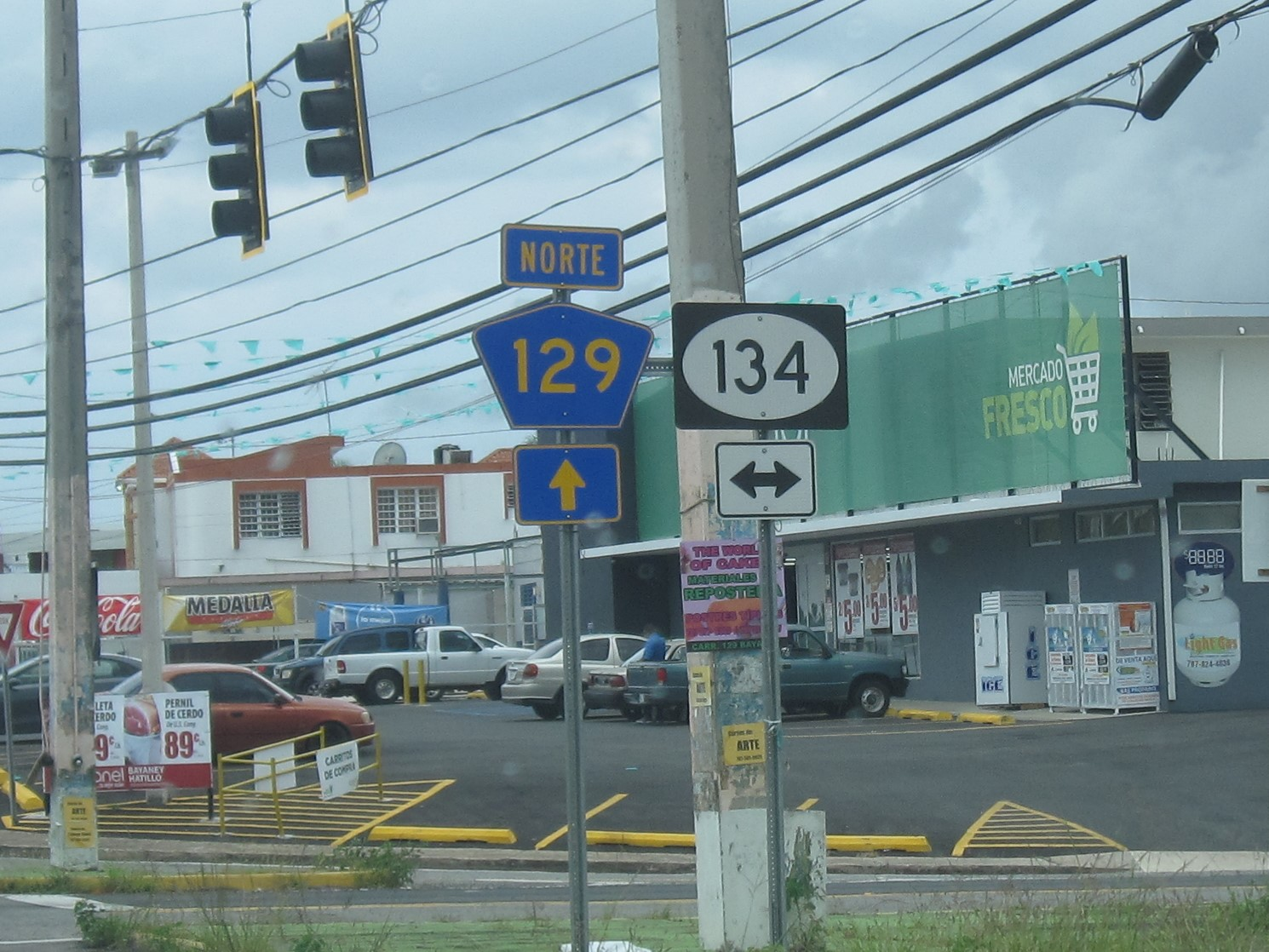
PR-134 junction sign in Bayaney, Hatillo

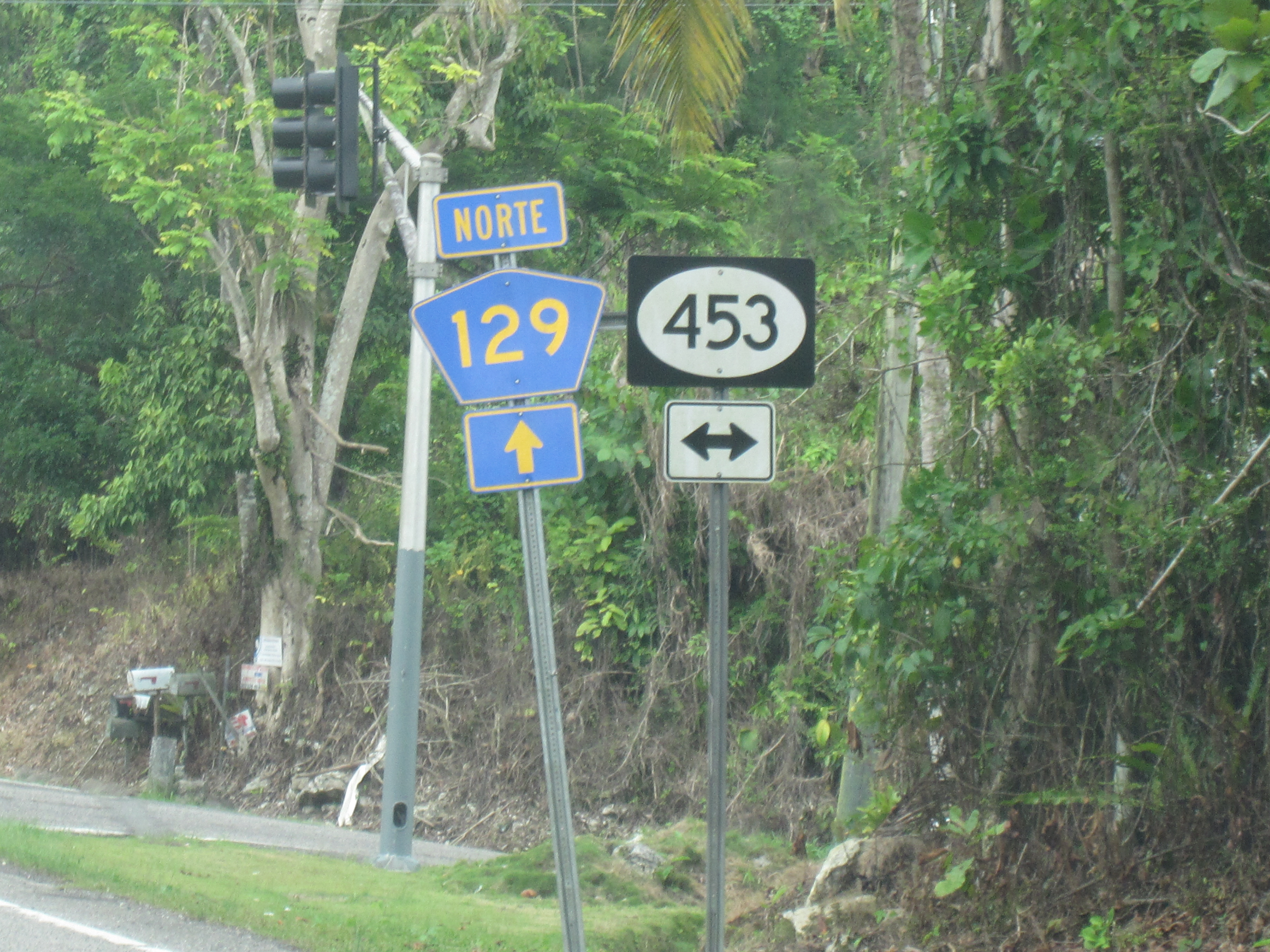
PR-453 junction sign in Lares, Puerto Rico

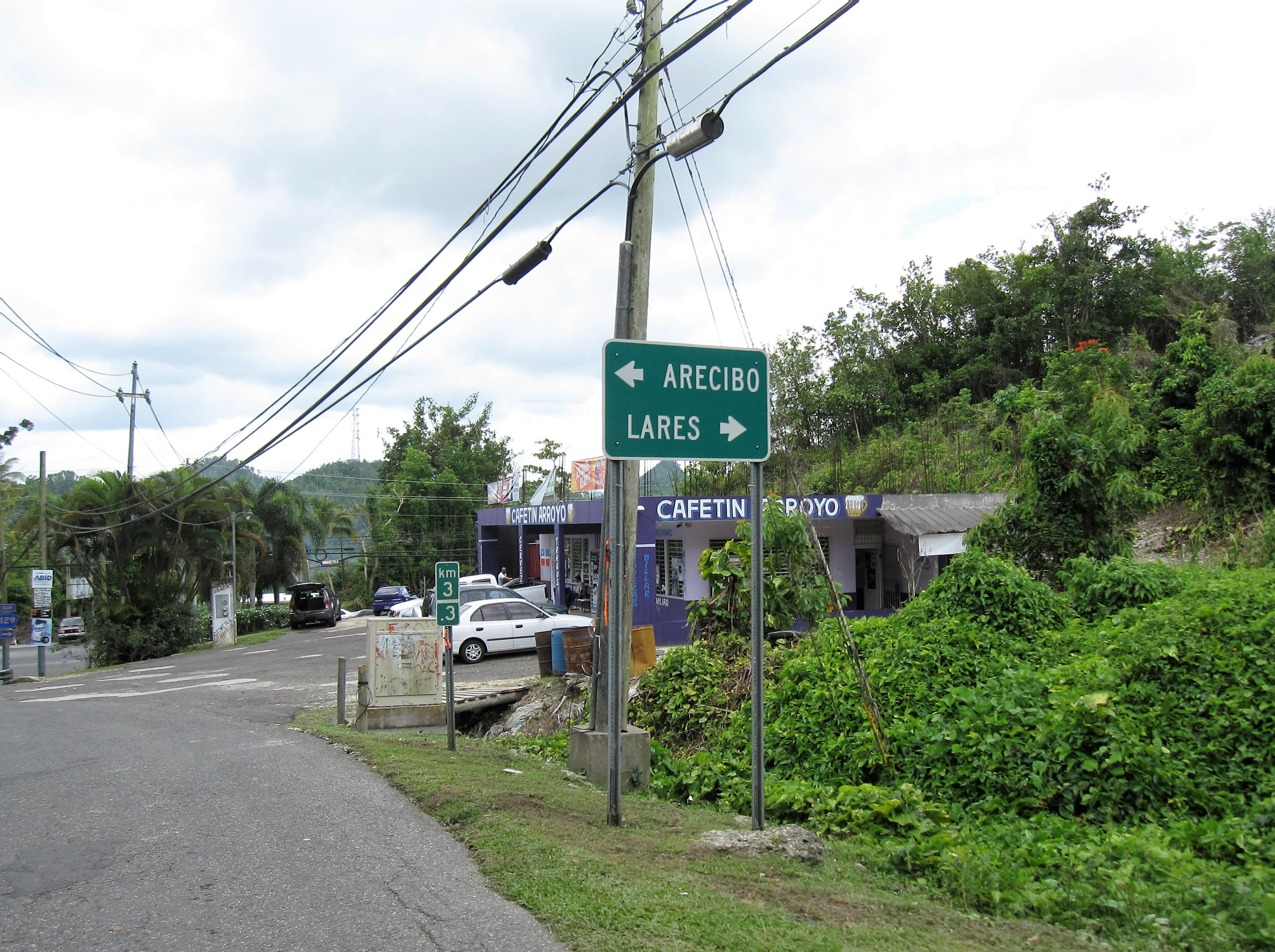
On PR-453 in Piletas approaching PR-129

Municipality	Location	km	mi	Destinations	Notes
Adjuntas	Yahuecas	43.2	26.8	PR-135 (Carretera Francisco L. Báez Cruz) – Adjuntas, Castañer	Southern terminus of PR-129
Adjuntas	Yahuecas–Portillo line	40.5	25.2	PR-526 (Carretera Antonio Portalatín Betancourt) – Tanamá	
Utuado	No major junctions				
Lares	Mirasol–Buenos Aires line	34.6	21.5	PR-415 – Buenos Aires	
Lares	Mirasol–Buenos Aires line	30.5	19.0	To PR-128 / PR-Calle La Torre – Lares, Yauco	
Lares	Buenos Aires	30.2	18.8	PR-415 – Buenos Aires	
Lares	Lares	27.7 38.2 (Note: Kilometer markers represent the distance along PR-111 rather than PR-129.)	17.2 23.7	PR-111 east (Carretera Enrique Laguerre) – Utuado	Eastern terminus of PR-111 concurrency
Lares	Lares	35.2 27.6	21.9 17.1	PR-111 west (Avenida Los Patriotas) – Lares	Western terminus of PR-111 concurrency; diamond interchange
Lares	Lares–Lares barrio-pueblo line	27.6– 27.5	17.1– 17.1	PR-1111 – Lares	
Lares	Piletas	25.5– 25.4	15.8– 15.8	PR-453 – Piletas	
Lares	Piletas	24.4– 24.3	15.2– 15.1	PR-4453 – Piletas, Arce	
Lares	Callejones	21.9	13.6	PR-454 – Callejones	
Camuy	Quebrada	18.8	11.7	PR-455 – Quebrada	
Hatillo	Bayaney	17.6– 17.5	10.9– 10.9	PR-134 – Bayaney	
Hatillo	Bayaney	15.4	9.6	PR-134 – Bayaney	
Hatillo	Bayaney	15.3– 15.2	9.5– 9.4	PR-487 – Buena Vista	
Hatillo	Campo Alegre	10.1– 10.0	6.3– 6.2	PR-134 – Bayaney	
Hatillo	Campo Alegre	9.0	5.6	PR-130 (Carretera Carlos Romero Barceló) – Hatillo	
Hatillo	Campo Alegre	7.3	4.5	PR-635 (Carretera Alcalde Frankie Hernández Jové) – Dominguito	
Arecibo	Hato Abajo–Hato Arriba line	3.7	2.3	PR-490 (Carretera Juan Antonio "Nito" Méndez) – Buena Vista	
Arecibo	Hato Abajo	3.4	2.1	PR-492 – Quemados	
Arecibo	Hato Abajo	3.0	1.9	PR-22 (Autopista José de Diego) – Aguadilla, Mayagüez, Bayamón, San Juan	PR-22 exits 77A and 77B; cloverleaf interchange
Arecibo	Hato Abajo–Arecibo barrio-pueblo line	1.5	0.93	PR-651 (Avenida Esteban Padilla) – Hato Arriba	
Arecibo	Hato Abajo–Arecibo barrio-pueblo line	1.1	0.68	PR-653 (Avenida Universidad) – Hatillo	
Arecibo	Arecibo barrio-pueblo	0.0	0.0	PR-2 (Avenida Miramar) – San Juan, Mayagüez	Northern terminus of PR-129
1.000 mi = 1.609 km; 1.000 km = 0.621 mi: Concurrency terminus

== See also ==
- 1953 Puerto Rico highway renumbering
