= Puerto Rico Highway 134 =

Highway in Puerto Rico

Highway 134
- Ruta 134

Route information
- Maintained by Puerto Rico DTPW
- Length: 17.5 km (10.9 mi)

Major junctions
- South end: PR-111 in Lares
- PR-455 in Bayaney; PR-129 in Bayaney; PR-489 in Aibonito; PR-635 in Aibonito
- North end: PR-129 in Campo Alegre

Location
- Country: United States
- Territory: Puerto Rico
- Municipalities: Lares, Utuado, Hatillo

Highway system
- Roads in Puerto Rico; List
← PR-133	→ PR-135

Puerto Rico Highway 134 (PR-134) is a rural road that travels from Lares, Puerto Rico to Hatillo. This highway begins at its intersection with PR-111 in barrio Lares and ends at its junction with PR-129 in Campo Alegre.

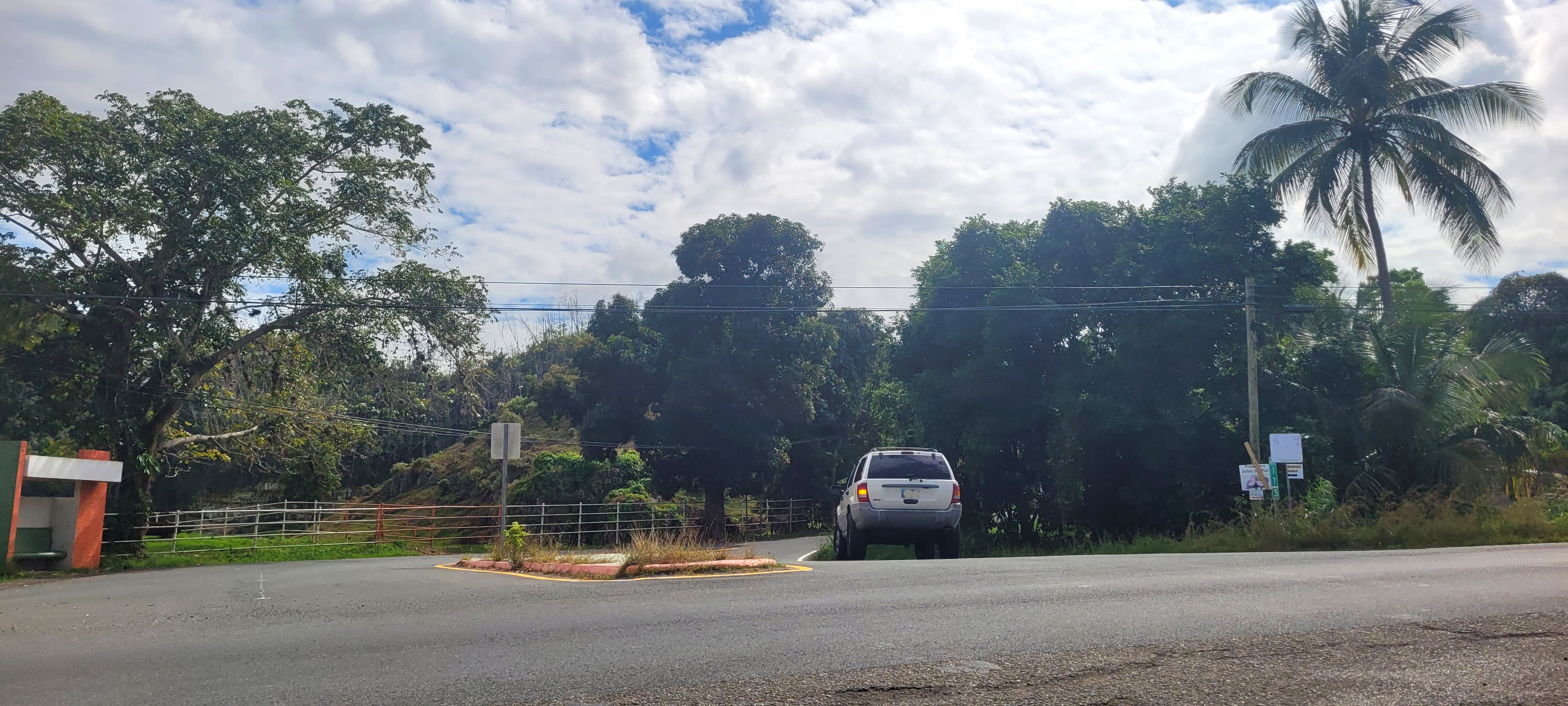
Southbound beginning of PR-134 at PR-129 junction in Campo Alegre, Hatillo

== Major intersections ==
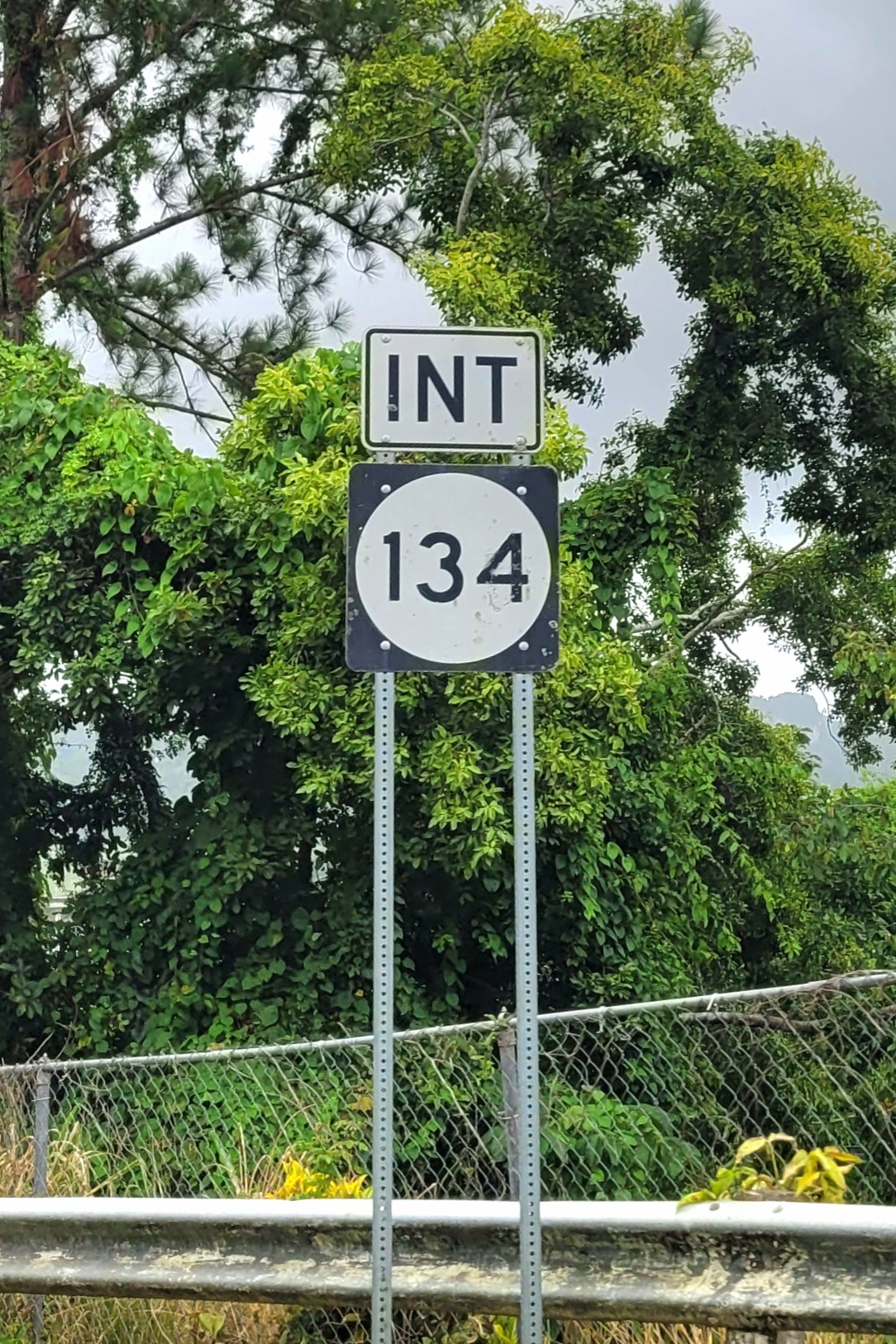
PR-111 east near PR-134 intersection in Lares

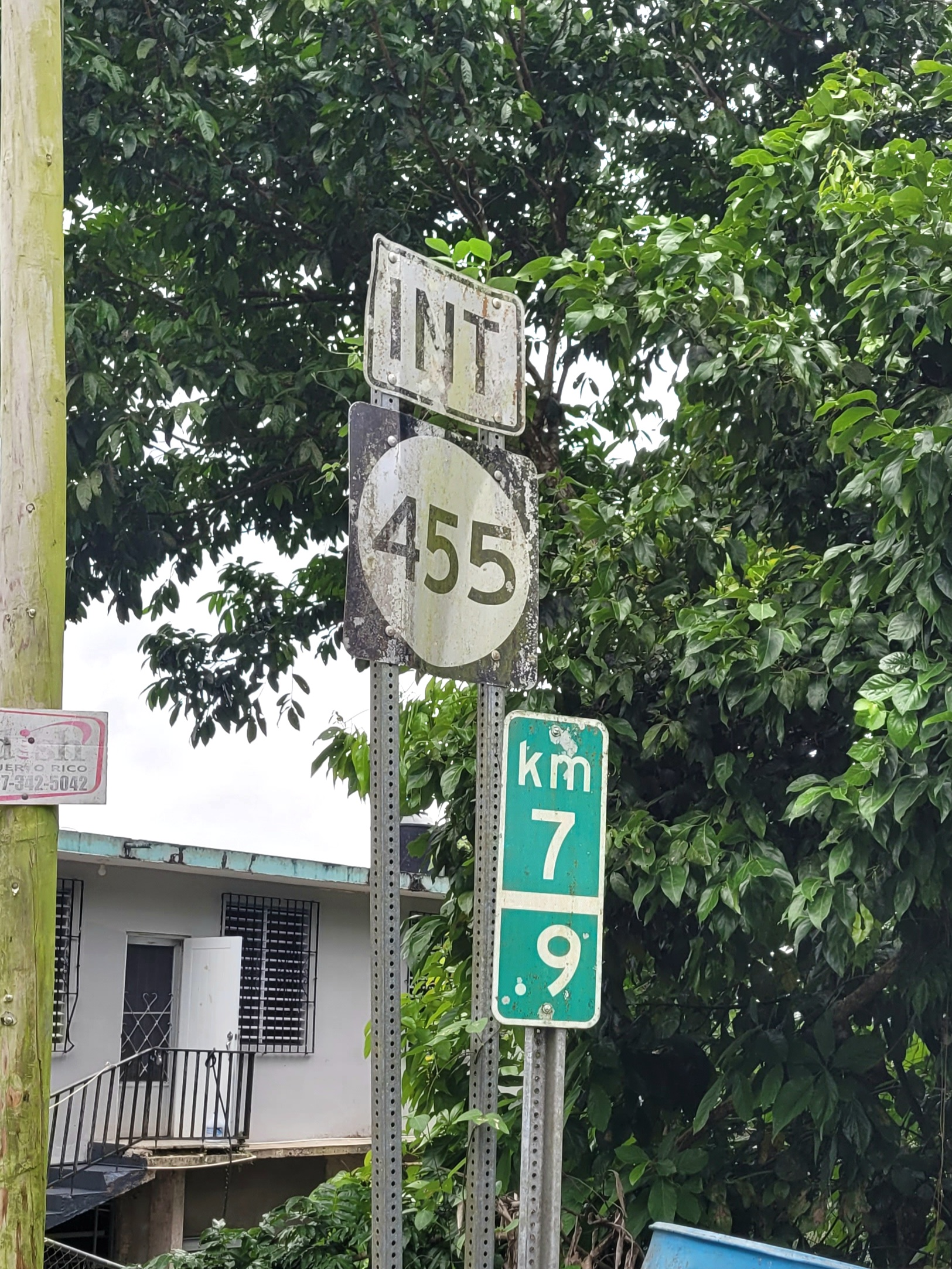
PR-134 south near PR-455 intersection in Bayaney, Hatillo

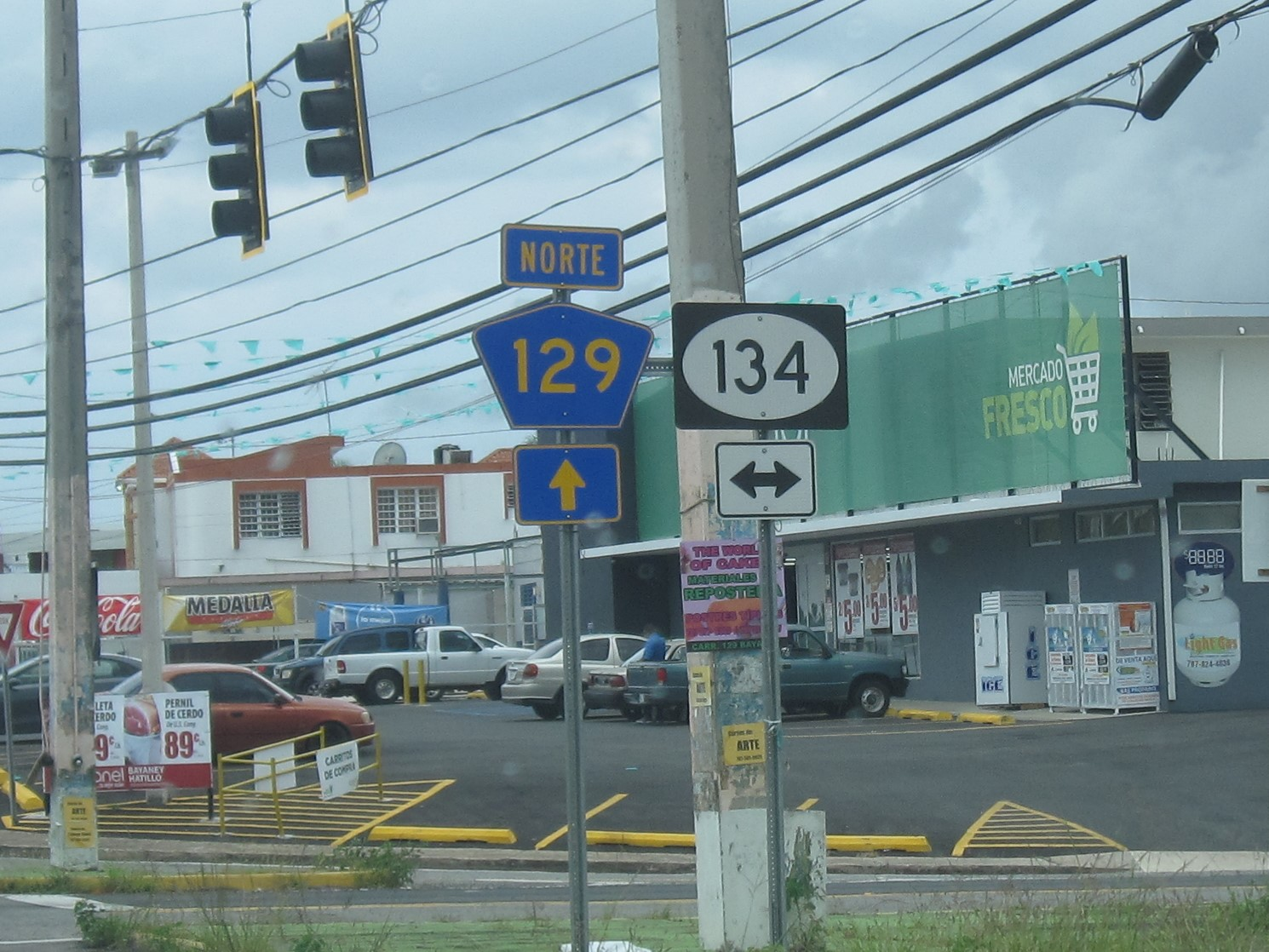
PR-129 north at PR-134 junction in Bayaney, Hatillo

Municipality	Location	km	mi	Destinations	Notes
Lares	Lares	0.0	0.0	PR-111 (Carretera Enrique Laguerre) – Lares, Utuado	Southern terminus of PR-134
Utuado	No major junctions				
Hatillo	No major junctions				
Lares	No major junctions				
Hatillo	Bayaney	7.8– 7.9	4.8– 4.9	PR-455 – Quebrada	
Hatillo	Bayaney	8.3	5.2	PR-129 (Carretera Mariana Bracetti) – Arecibo, Lares	
Hatillo	Bayaney	11.0	6.8	PR-129 (Carretera Mariana Bracetti) – Arecibo, Lares	
Hatillo	Aibonito	13.9	8.6	PR-489 – Aibonito	
Hatillo	Aibonito	14.2	8.8	PR-635 (Carretera Frankie Hernández Jové) – Esperanza	
Hatillo	Campo Alegre	17.5	10.9	PR-129 (Carretera Mariana Bracetti) – Arecibo, Lares	Northern terminus of PR-134
1.000 mi = 1.609 km; 1.000 km = 0.621 mi
