= Piletas =

Barrio of Lares, Puerto Rico

Piletas Piletas Arce
- Barrio
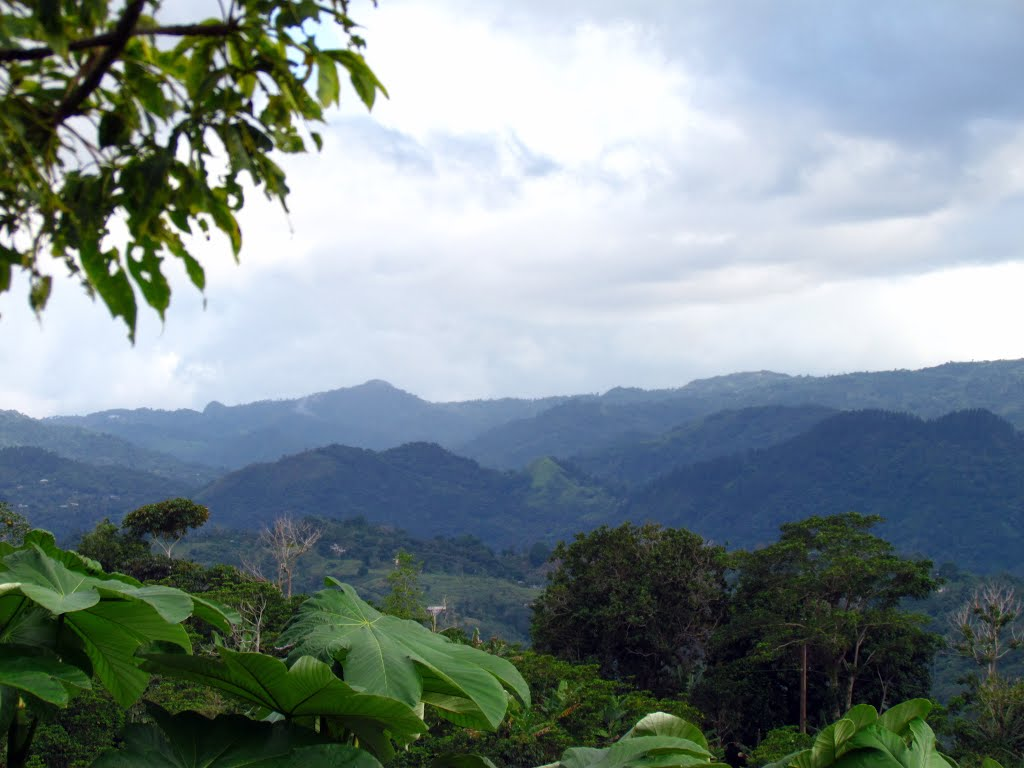
- Mountain view from PR-129 in Piletas, Lares

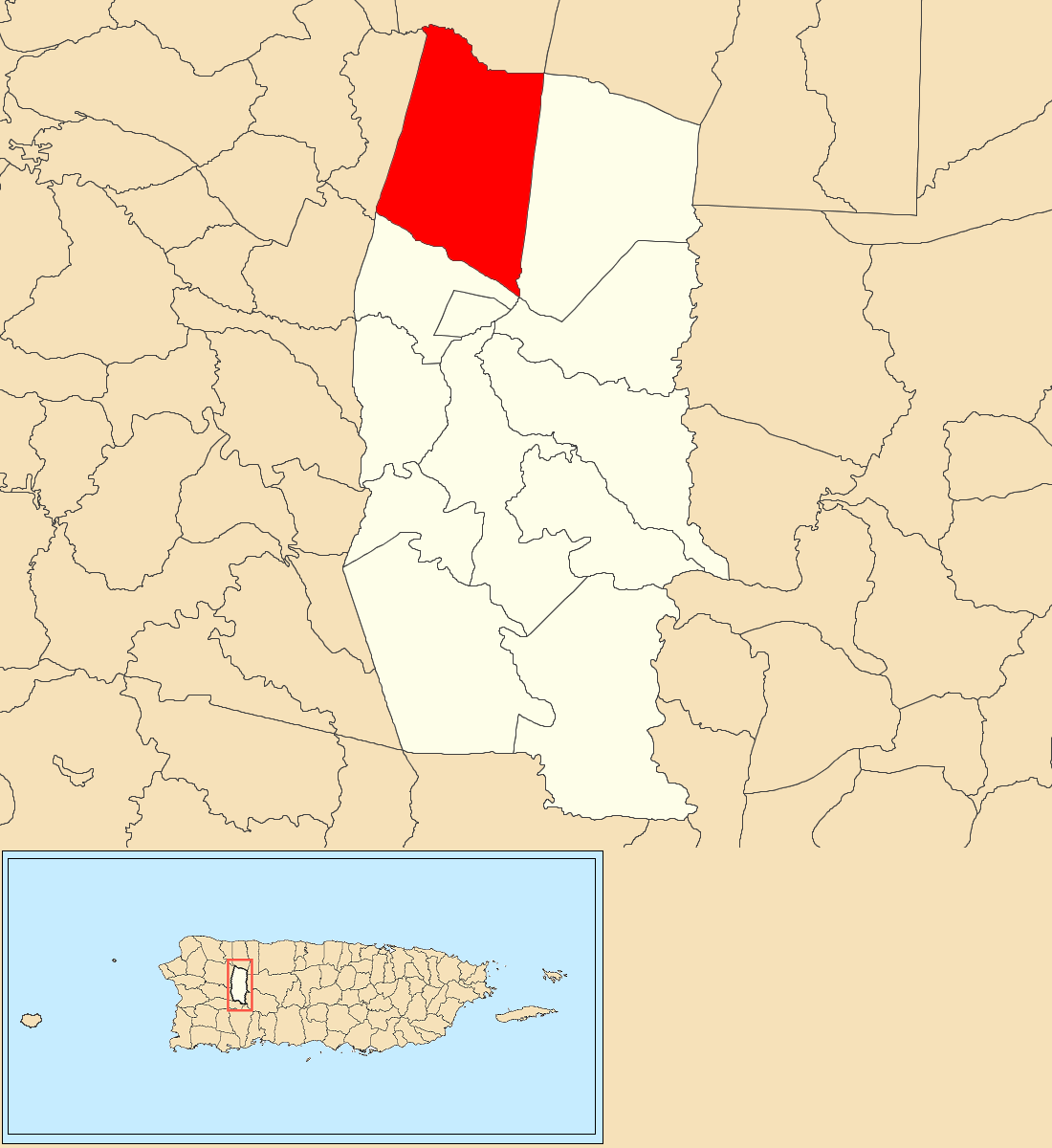
- Location of Piletas barrio within the municipality of Lares shown in red

- Location within the Caribbean
- Coordinates: 18°20′05″N 66°52′56″W
- Commonwealth: Puerto Rico
- Municipality: Lares

Area
  - Total: 7.76 sq mi (20.1 km^{2})
  - Land: 7.76 sq mi (20.1 km^{2})
  - Water: 0 sq mi (0 km^{2})
- Elevation: 1,148 ft (350 m)

Population (2010)
  - Total: 5,671
  - Density: 730.8/sq mi (282.2/km^{2})
- Source: 2010 Census
- Time zone: UTC−4 (AST)

Piletas is a barrio in the municipality of Lares, Puerto Rico. Its population in 2010 was 5,671.

== History ==
Piletas was in Spain's gazetteers until Puerto Rico was ceded by Spain in the aftermath of the Spanish–American War under the terms of the Treaty of Paris of 1898 and became an unincorporated territory of the United States. In 1899, the United States Department of War conducted a census of Puerto Rico finding that the population of Piletas barrio was 2,455.

Historical population
Census	Pop.	Note	%±
1900	2,455		—
1910	2,529		3.0%
1920	3,193		26.3%
1930	3,131		−1.9%
1940	4,416		41.0%
1950	4,659		5.5%
1960	4,090		−12.2%
1970	3,808		−6.9%
1980	3,917		2.9%
1990	4,526		15.5%
2000	5,656		25.0%
2010	5,671		0.3%
U.S. Decennial Census; 1899 (shown as 1900) 1910-1930; 1930-1950 1980-2000 2010

== Places ==
In 2017, as Puerto Rico and Lares continued to struggle economically, community leaders decided that unused public schools, including one in Piletas Arce (on Puerto Rico Highway 129), would be used by the agricultural industry of Lares. The school became a community center for local farmers.

La Piramide de Piletas Restaurant, located in Sector Las Lajas, was featured by the Puerto Rico Department of Tourism Discover Puerto Rico campaign.

== Sectors ==
Barrios (which are, in contemporary times, roughly comparable to minor civil divisions) and subbarrios, in turn, are further subdivided into smaller local populated place areas/units called sectores (sectors in English). The types of sectores may vary, from normally sector to urbanización to reparto to barriada to residencial, among others.

The following sectors are in Piletas barrio:

Lito Ramos, Palo Pana, Sector Aquino, Sector Arroyo, Sector Bayón, Sector Borges, Sector Cabán, Sector Castro, Sector Catalino Rodríguez, Sector Club Rotario, Sector Coquí, Sector Escuela 1, Sector Juan Sosa, Sector La Pista, Sector Las Casetas, Sector Los López Segarra, Sector Núñez, Sector Olavarría, Sector Pedro Molina, Sector Ramón Román, Sector Reyes Lugo, Sector Segunda Unidad, Sector Soller, and Tramo Carretera 453.

== Gallery ==
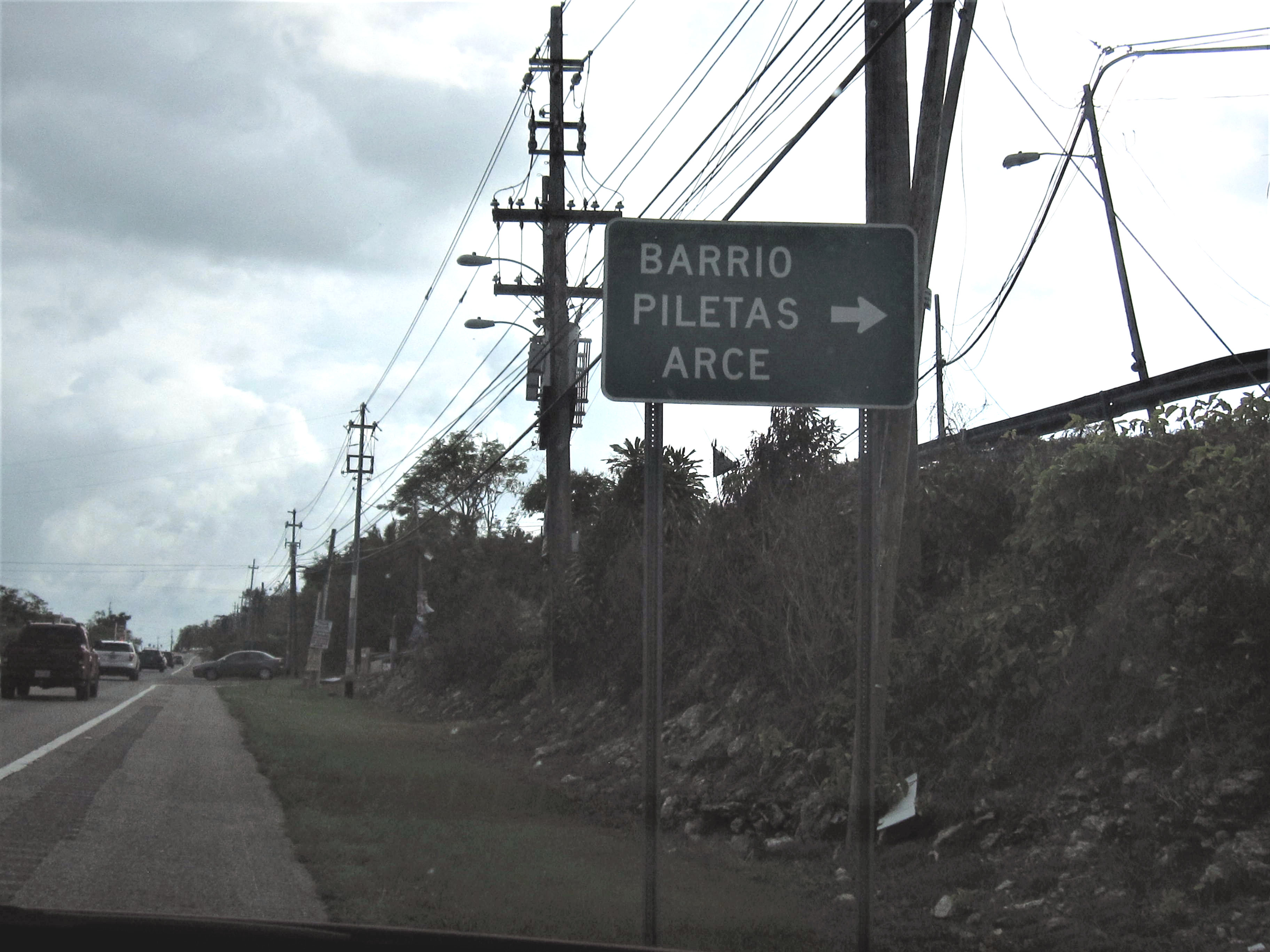
Sign for entrance to Piletas Arce

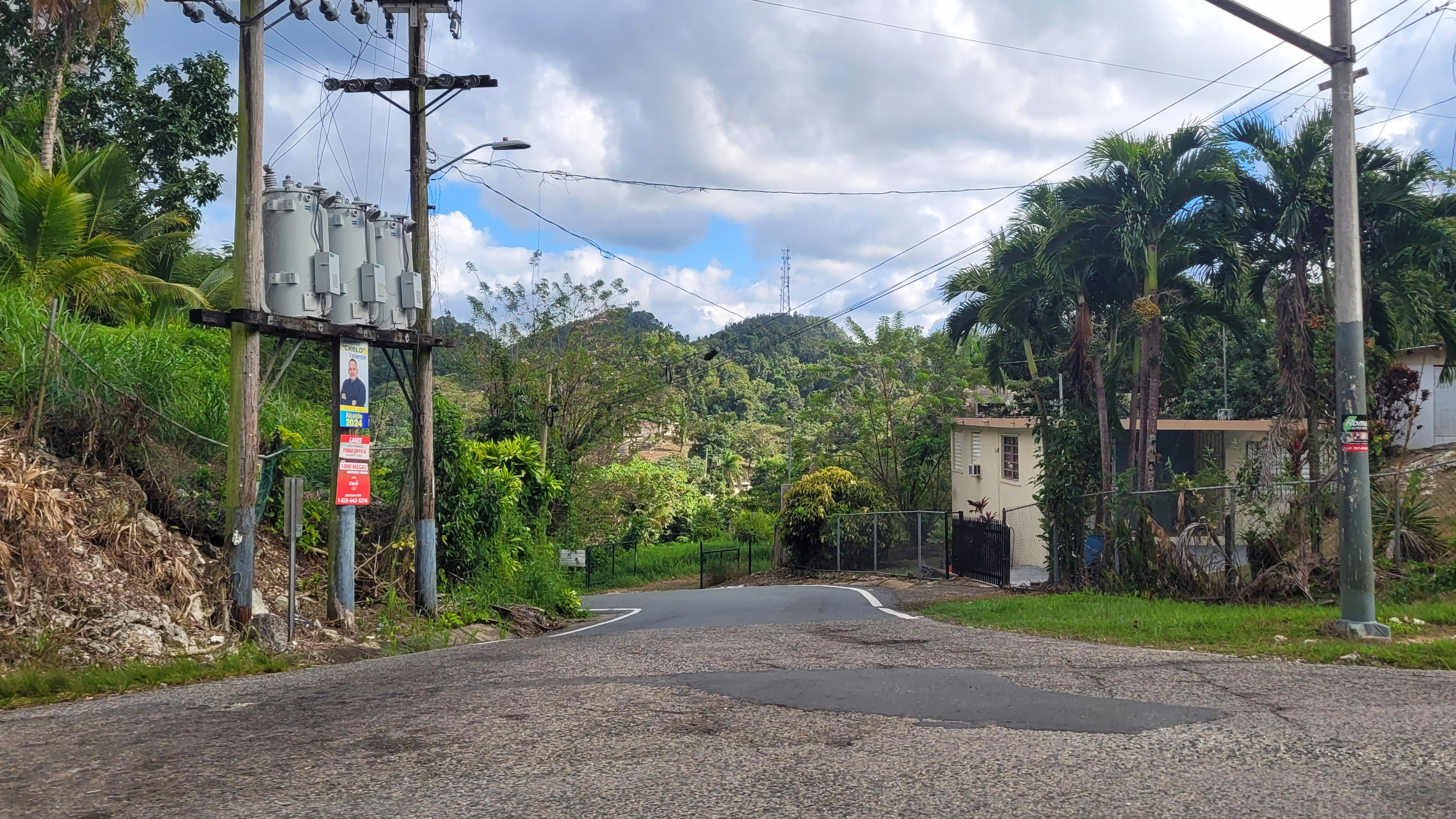
Puerto Rico Highway 453 in Piletas

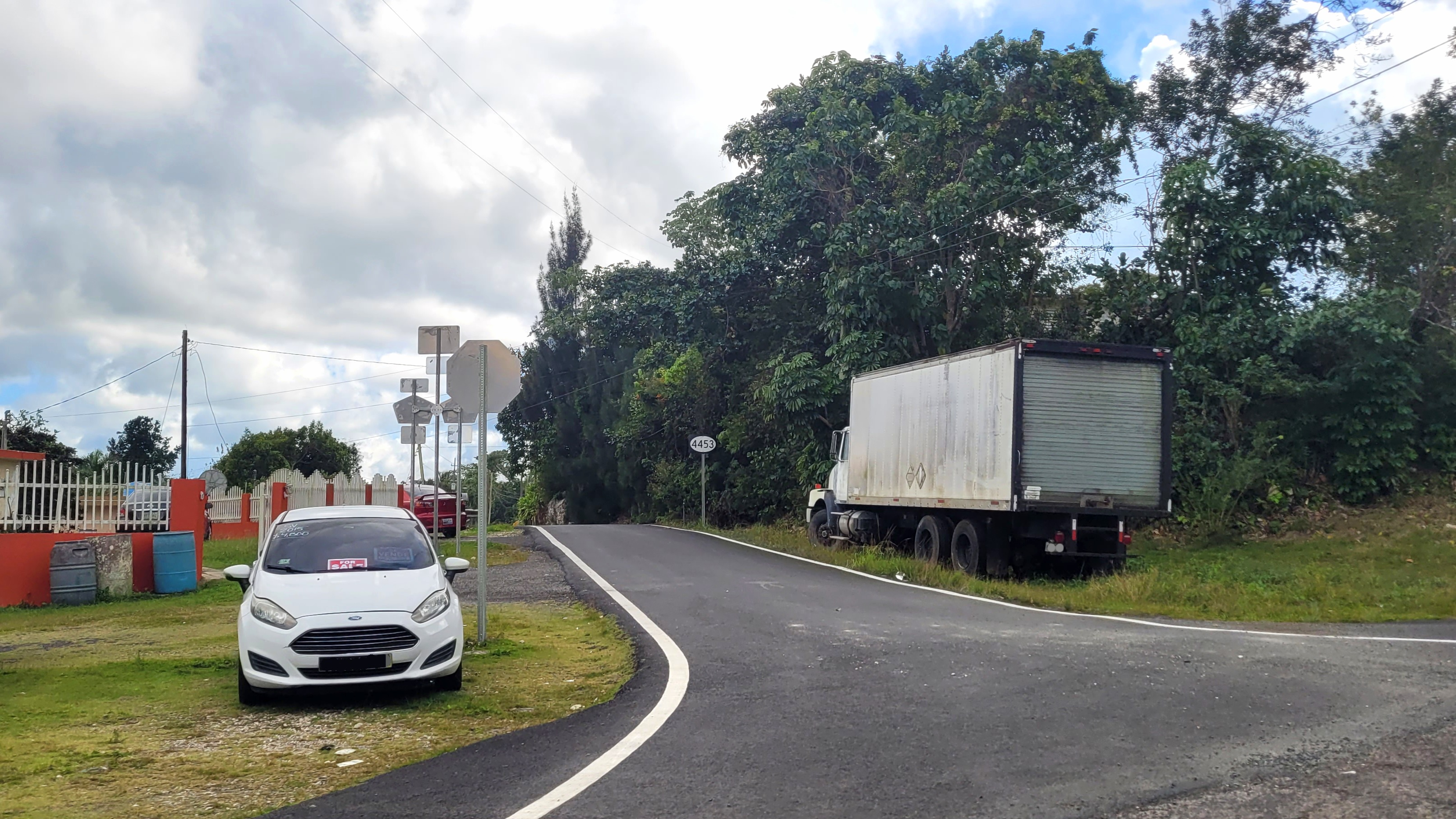
Puerto Rico Highway 4453 in Piletas

== See also ==
- List of communities in Puerto Rico
- List of barrios and sectors of Lares, Puerto Rico
