= Campo Alegre, Hatillo, Puerto Rico =

Barrio of Puerto Rico

Campo Alegre
- Barrio
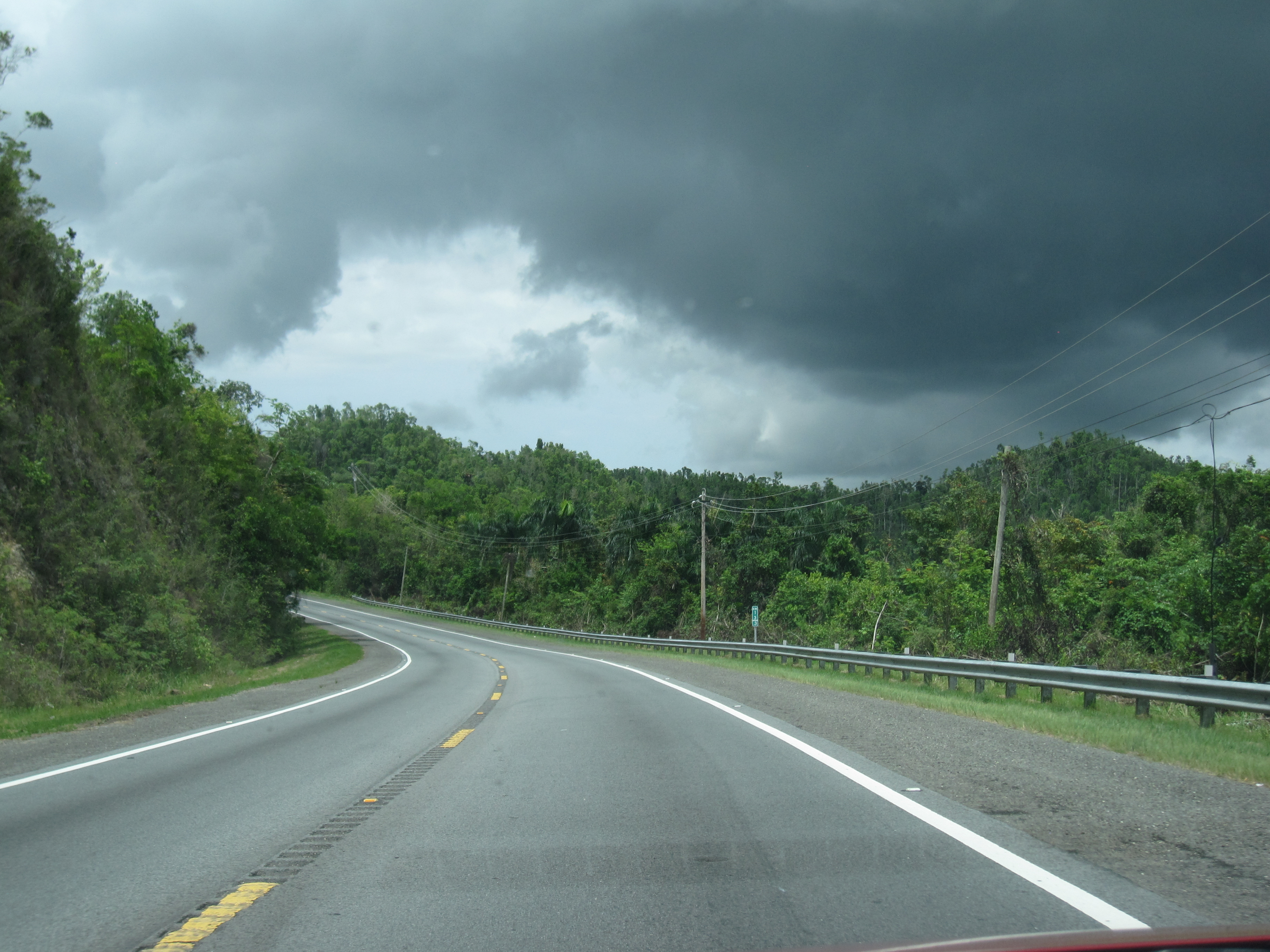
- On PR-129 near Campo Alegre

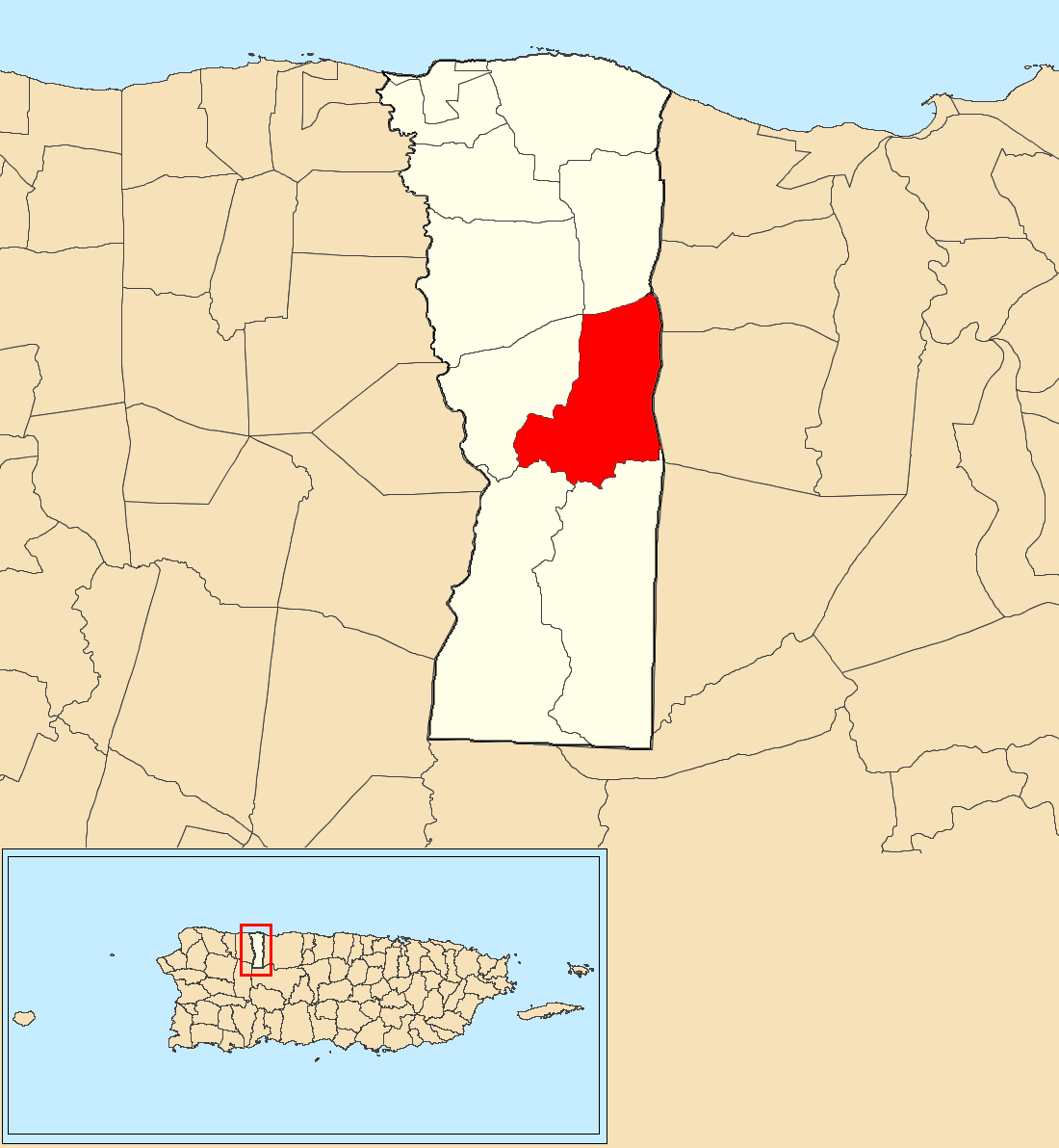
- Location of Campo Alegre within the municipality of Hatillo shown in red

- Location of Puerto Rico
- Coordinates: 18°24′59″N 66°47′08″W
- Commonwealth: Puerto Rico
- Municipality: Hatillo

Area
  - Total: 4.64 sq mi (12.0 km^{2})
  - Land: 4.62 sq mi (12.0 km^{2})
  - Water: 0.02 sq mi (0.052 km^{2})
- Elevation: 591 ft (180 m)

Population (2010)
  - Total: 5,210
  - Density: 1,125.3/sq mi (434.5/km^{2})
- Source: 2010 Census
- Time zone: UTC−4 (AST)

Campo Alegre is a rural barrio in the municipality of Hatillo, Puerto Rico. Its population in 2010 was 5,210.

Historical population
Census	Pop.	Note	%±
1900	995		—
1910	1,037		4.2%
1920	1,311		26.4%
1930	1,591		21.4%
1940	1,653		3.9%
1950	2,718		64.4%
1960	2,734		0.6%
1970	2,913		6.5%
1980	3,781		29.8%
1990	4,214		11.5%
2000	4,829		14.6%
2010	5,210		7.9%
U.S. Decennial Census; 1899 (shown as 1900) 1910-1930; 1930-1950 1980-2000 2010

== Gallery ==
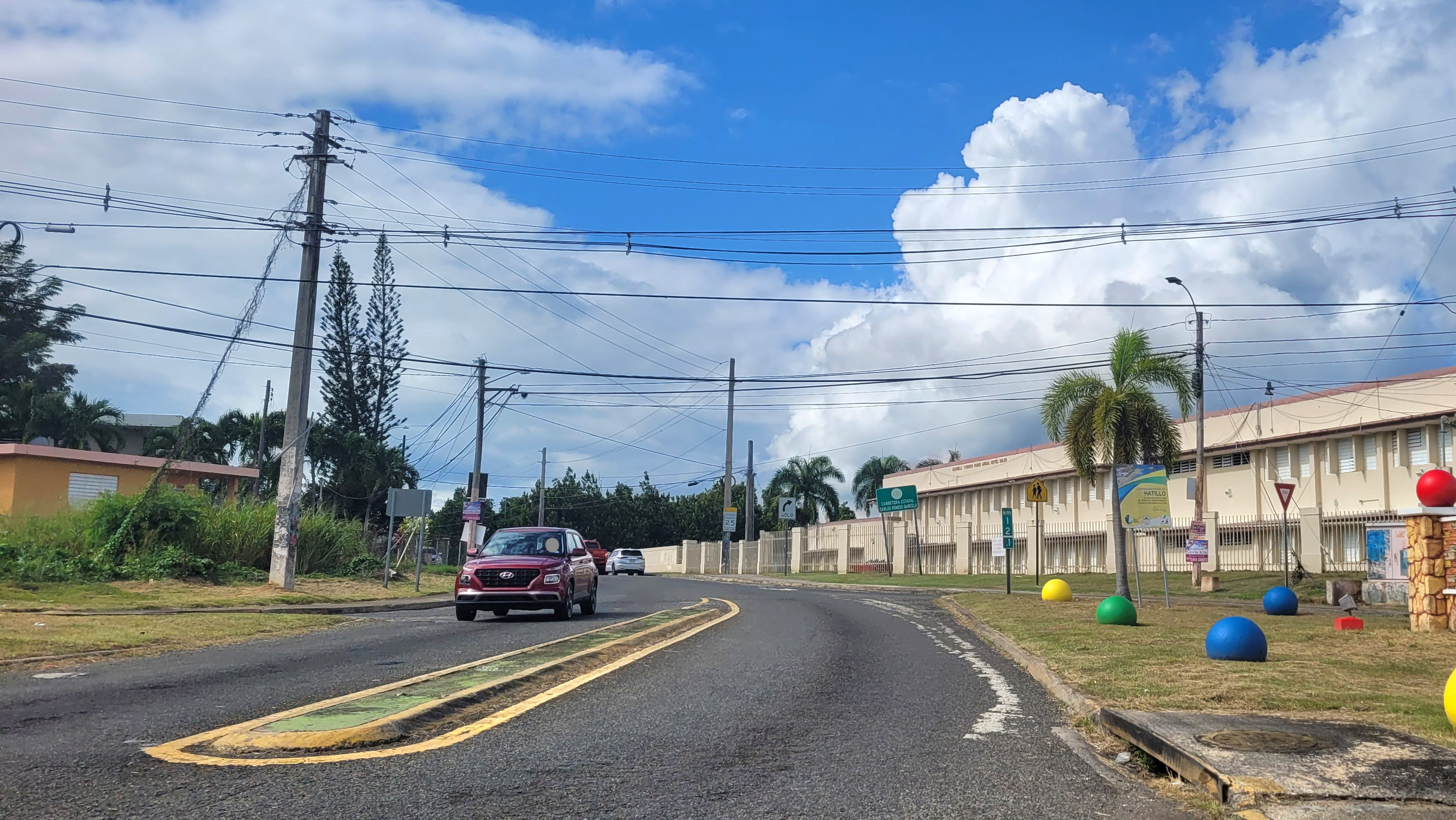
Puerto Rico Highway 130 in Campo Alegre

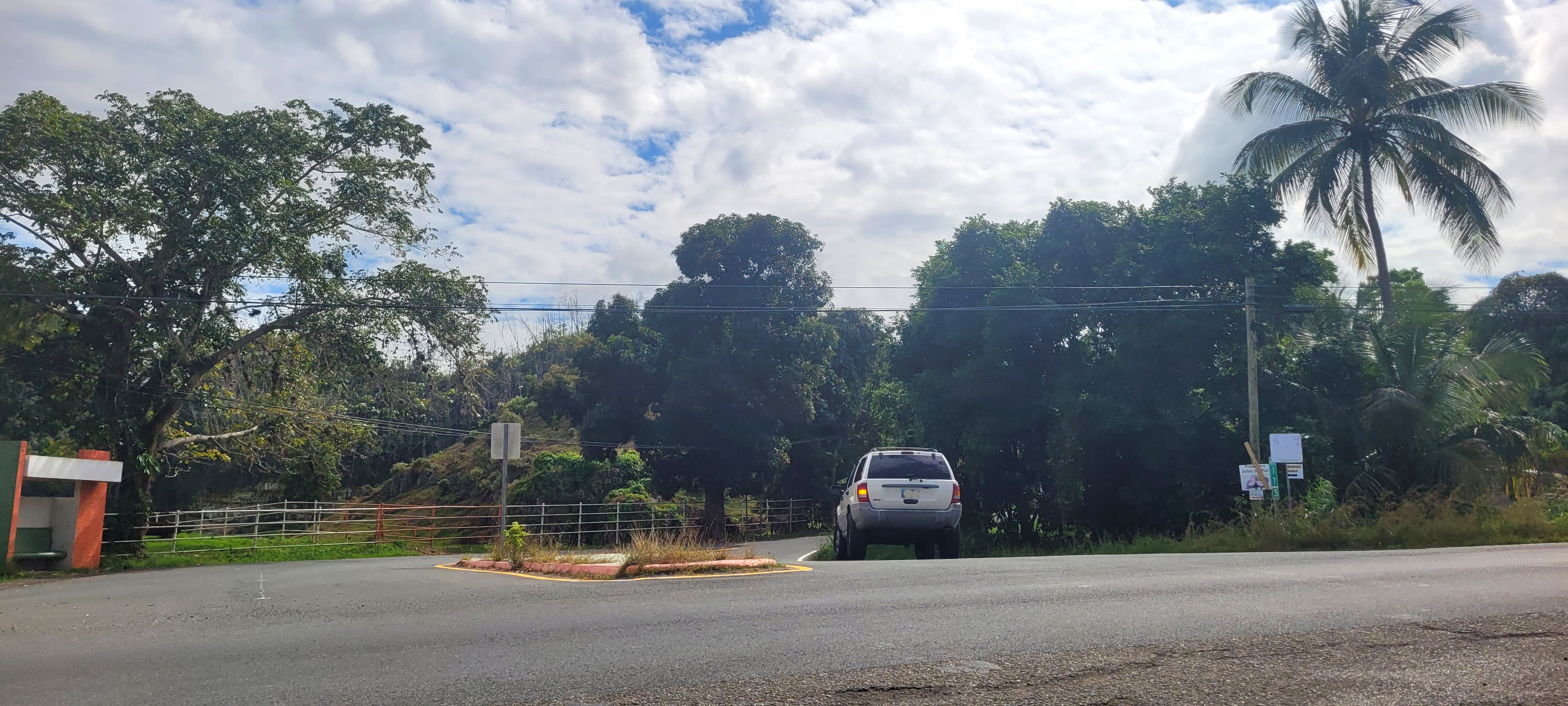
Puerto Rico Highway 134 in Campo Alegre

== See also ==
- List of communities in Puerto Rico
