= Hato Abajo, Arecibo, Puerto Rico =

Barrio of Puerto Rico

Hato Abajo
- Barrio
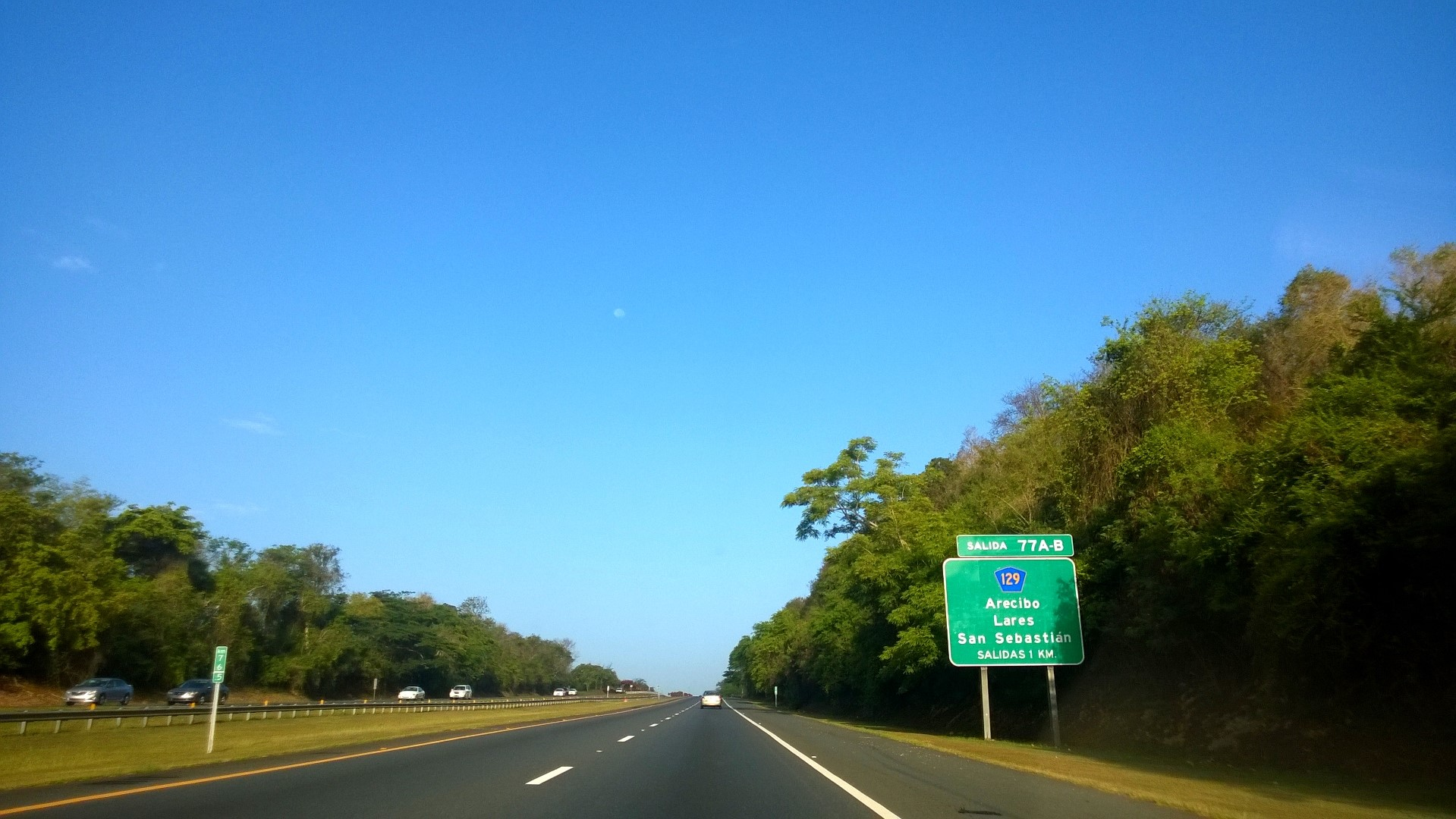
- Puerto Rico Highway 22 in Hato Abajo

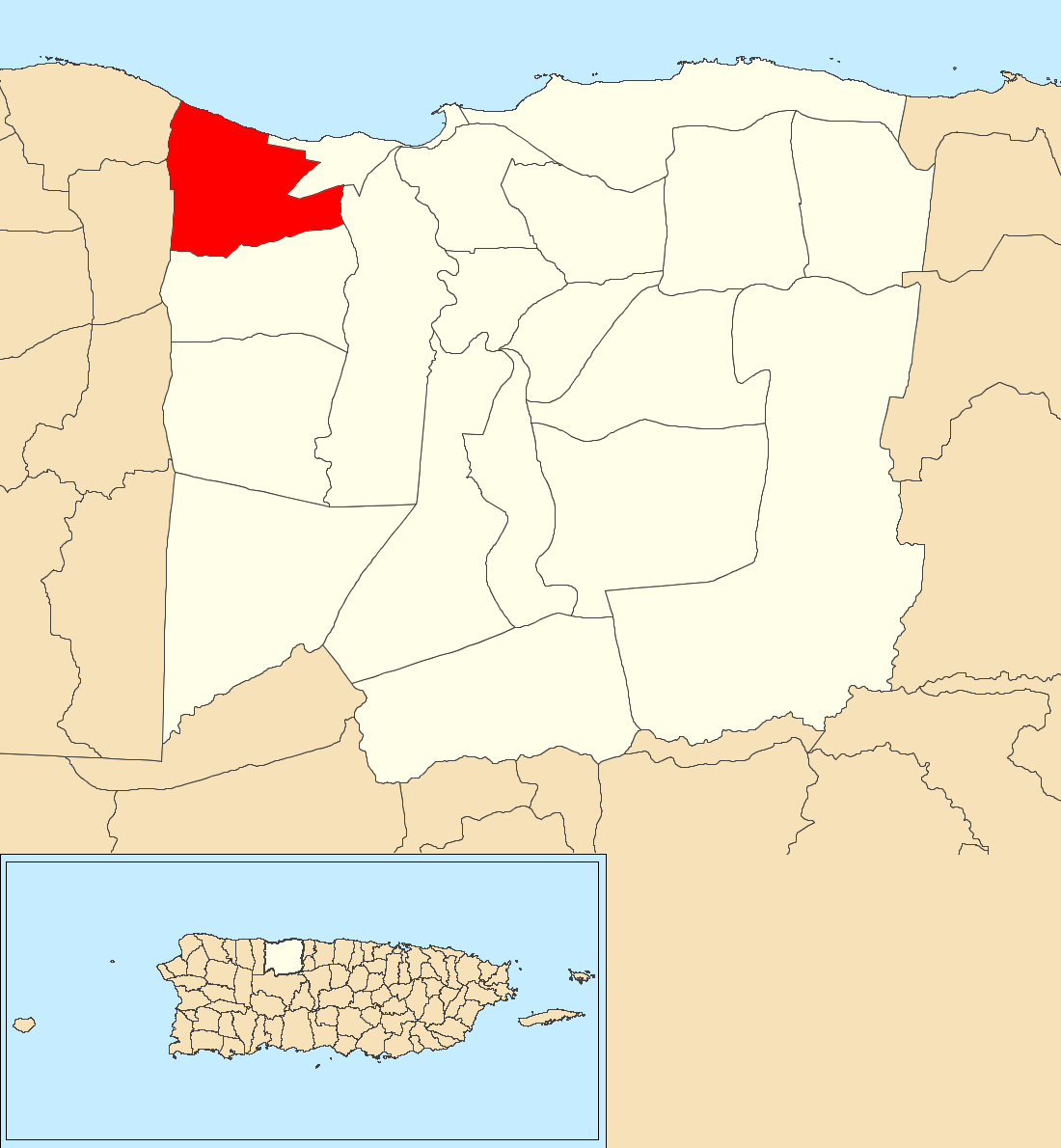
- Location of Hato Abajo within the municipality of Arecibo shown in red

- Location of Puerto Rico
- Coordinates: 18°27′58″N 66°45′02″W
- Commonwealth: Puerto Rico
- Municipality: Arecibo

Area
  - Total: 5.42 sq mi (14.0 km^{2})
  - Land: 4.82 sq mi (12.5 km^{2})
  - Water: 0.60 sq mi (1.6 km^{2})
- Elevation: 98 ft (30 m)

Population (2010)
  - Total: 19,699
  - Density: 4,095.4/sq mi (1,581.2/km^{2})
- Source: 2010 Census
- Time zone: UTC−4 (AST)

Hato Abajo is a barrio in the municipality of Arecibo, Puerto Rico. Its population in 2010 was 19,699.

== History ==
Hato Abajo was in Spain's gazetteers until Puerto Rico was ceded by Spain in the aftermath of the Spanish–American War under the terms of the Treaty of Paris of 1898 and became an unincorporated territory of the United States. In 1899, the United States Department of War conducted a census of Puerto Rico finding that the population of Hato Abajo barrio was 1,869.

Historical population
Census	Pop.	Note	%±
1900	1,869		—
1910	2,684		43.6%
1920	2,670		−0.5%
1930	4,533		69.8%
1940	2,271		−49.9%
1950	2,599		14.4%
1960	990		−61.9%
1970	0		−100.0%
1980	21,779		—
1990	22,505		3.3%
2000	22,597		0.4%
2010	19,699		−12.8%
U.S. Decennial Census; 1899 (shown as 1900) 1910-1930; 1930-1950 1980-2000 2010

== Sectors ==
Barrios (which are, in contemporary times, roughly comparable to minor civil divisions) in turn are further subdivided into smaller local populated place areas/units called sectores (sectors in English). The types of sectores may vary, from normally sector to urbanización to reparto to barriada to residencial, among others.

The following sectors are in Hato Abajo barrio:

Apartamentos Hermano Durán, Apartamentos La Paz, Avenida San Daniel, Avenida San Luis, Calle Anita Vázquez, Callejon Los Ávila, Camino Los García, Comunidad Mora, Comunidad Navas, Comunidad Nuevas Hato Arriba, Comunidad Víctor Rojas 1, Comunidad Víctor Rojas 2, Condominios Terrazul, Égida Adolfo Martínez, Jardines de Hato Arriba, Monte Brisas, Paseo La Esmeralda, Paseo los Húcares, Reparto Colina Verde, Reparto Glorivee, Reparto Luribet, Reparto Pérez Abreu, Reparto San Jorge, Reparto San Miguel, Residencial La Meseta, Sector Barrancas, Sector Combate, Sector Cunetas, Sector Denton, Sector El Rosario, Sector El Tamarindo, Sector El Tanque, Sector El Tres, Sector Iglesia, Sector Jayuya, Sector Juncos, Sector Korea, Sector La Ceiba, Sector Las Canelas, Sector Los Delgado, Sector Los Mora, Sector Luis Delgado Hernández, Sector San Daniel, Sector Tamarindo, Urbanización Reparto Edna, Urbanización Alturas de San Daniel, Urbanización Alturas del Atlántico, Urbanización Alturas del Paraíso, Urbanización Campo Real, Urbanización Ciudad Atlantis, Urbanización Colinas de Palmarito, Urbanización Colinas de Villa Toledo, Urbanización El Paraíso, Urbanización Ermelinda Estate, Urbanización Estancias del Norte, Urbanización Estancias El Verde, Urbanización Extensión Villa Los Santos II, Urbanización Hacienda de Juncos, Urbanización Hacienda del Mar, Urbanización Hacienda Toledo, Urbanización Jardines de Arecibo, Urbanización Jardines de Juncos, Urbanización Jardines de San Rafael, Urbanización Las Brisas, Urbanización Los Corozos, Urbanización Parque de Jardines, Urbanización Paseo del Prado, Urbanización Paseo Los Robles, Urbanización Valle Escondido, Urbanización Villa Delgado, Urbanización Villa Gloria, Urbanización Villa Rubí, Urbanización Villa Toledo, Urbanización Villas de Altamira, Urbanización Vista Azul, Urbanización Vista Hermosa, Urbanización y Extensión Marisol, Villa Iris, Villa Los Ángeles, Villa Rosa, and Villas del Remanso.

== Gallery ==
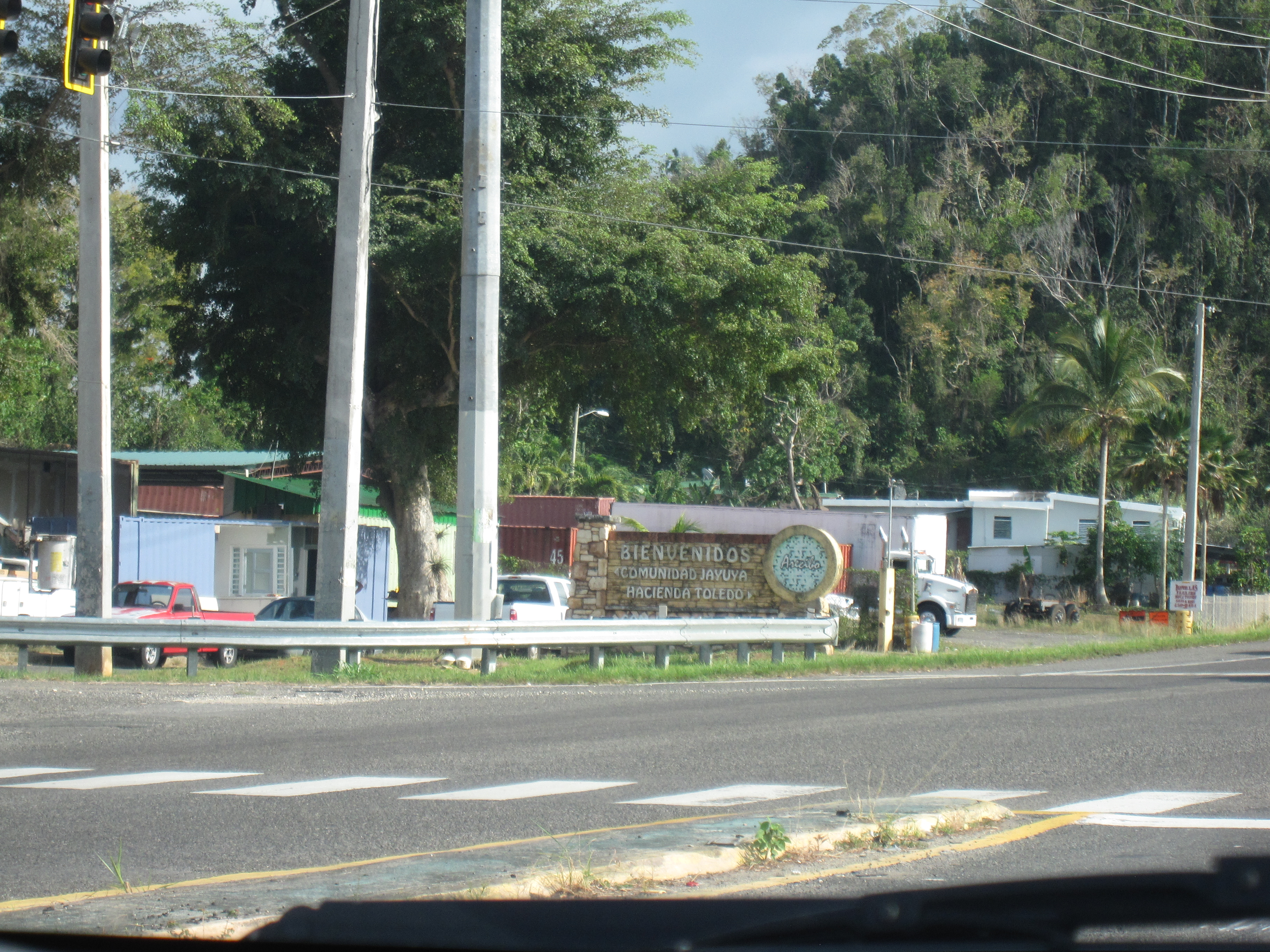
Hacienda Toledo in Hato Abajo

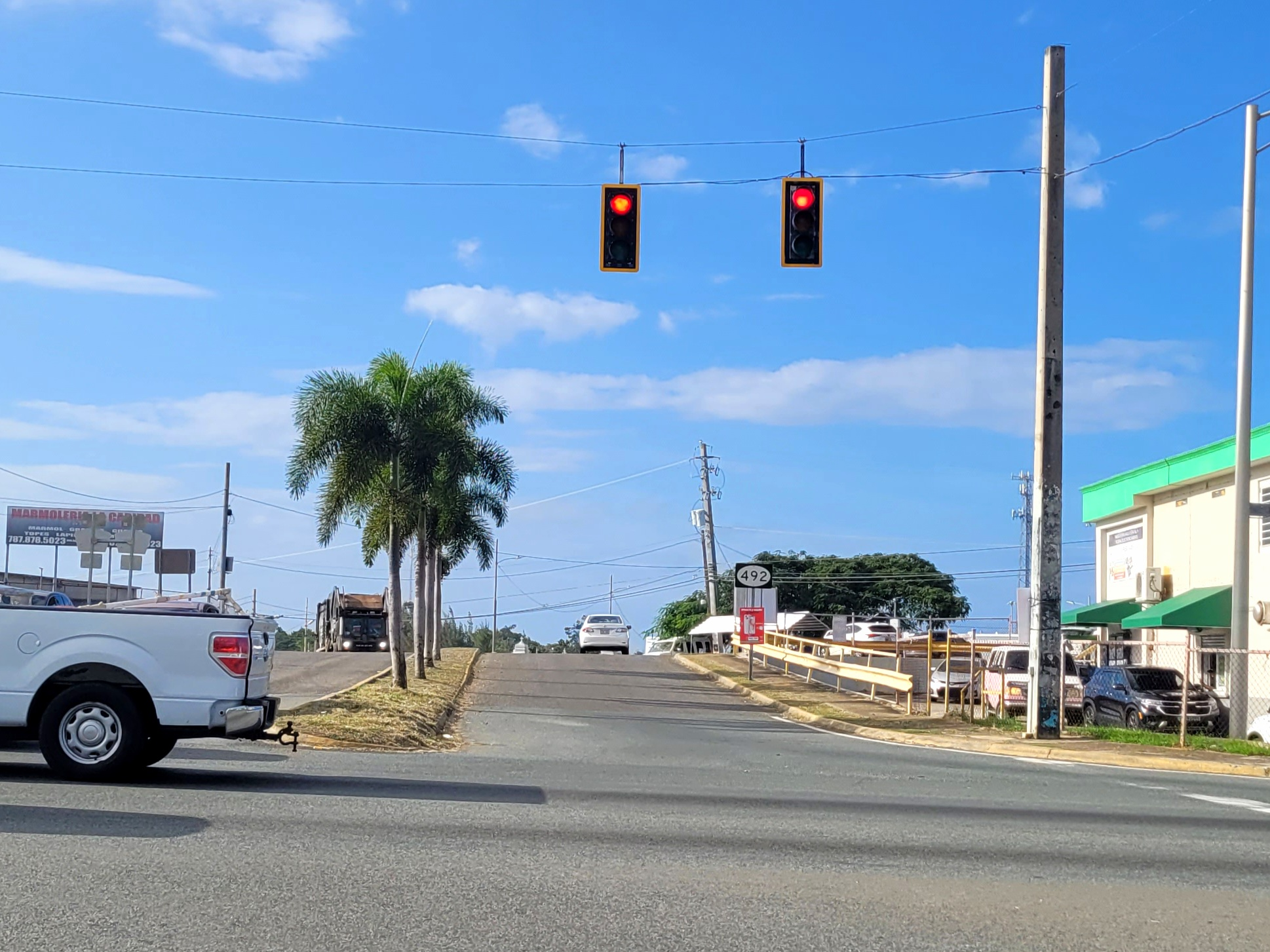
Puerto Rico Highway 492 in Hato Abajo

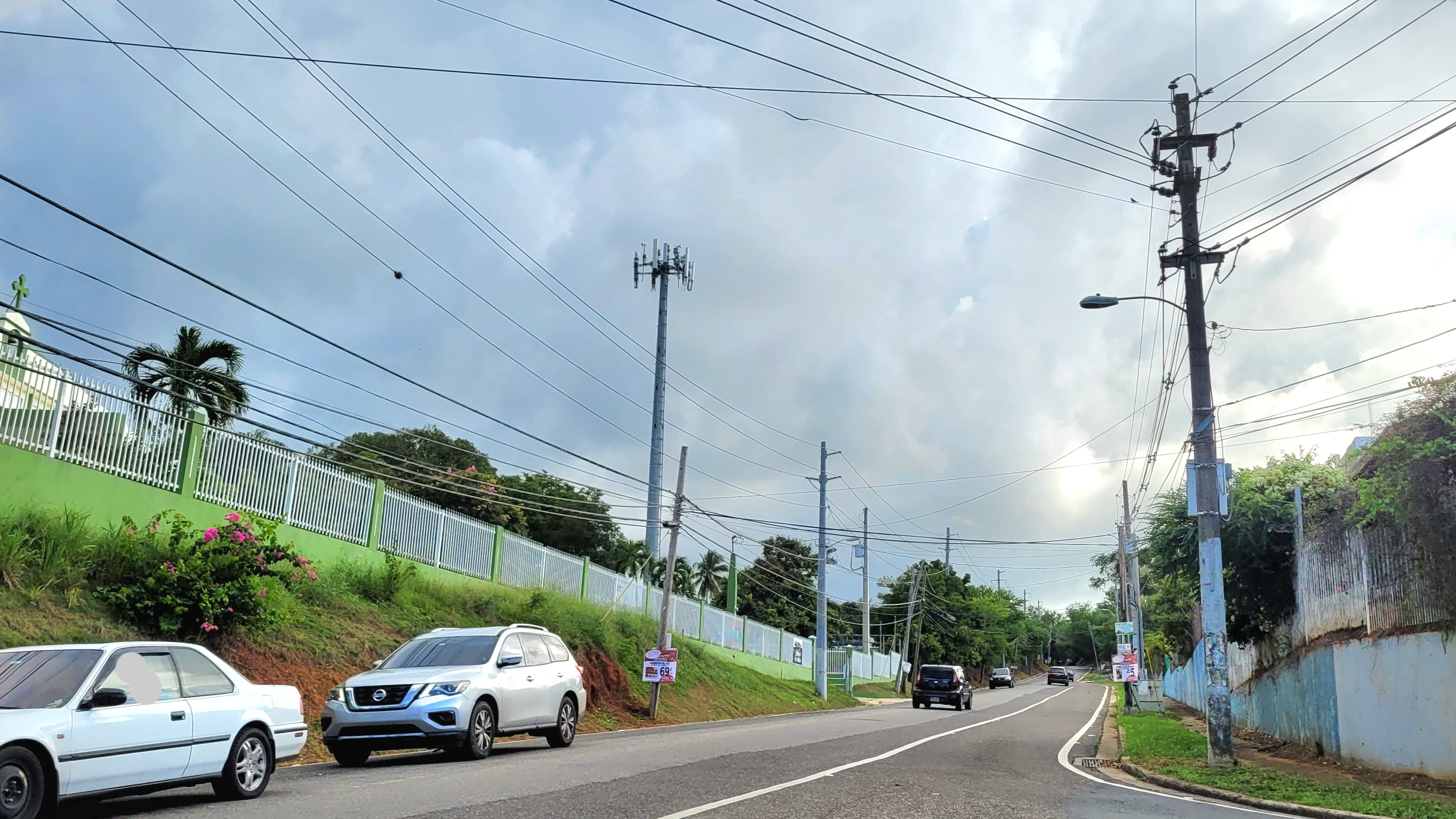
Puerto Rico Highway 651 in Hato Abajo

== See also ==
- List of communities in Puerto Rico
- List of barrios and sectors of Arecibo, Puerto Rico
