= Quebrada, Camuy, Puerto Rico =

Barrio of Puerto Rico

Quebrada
- Barrio
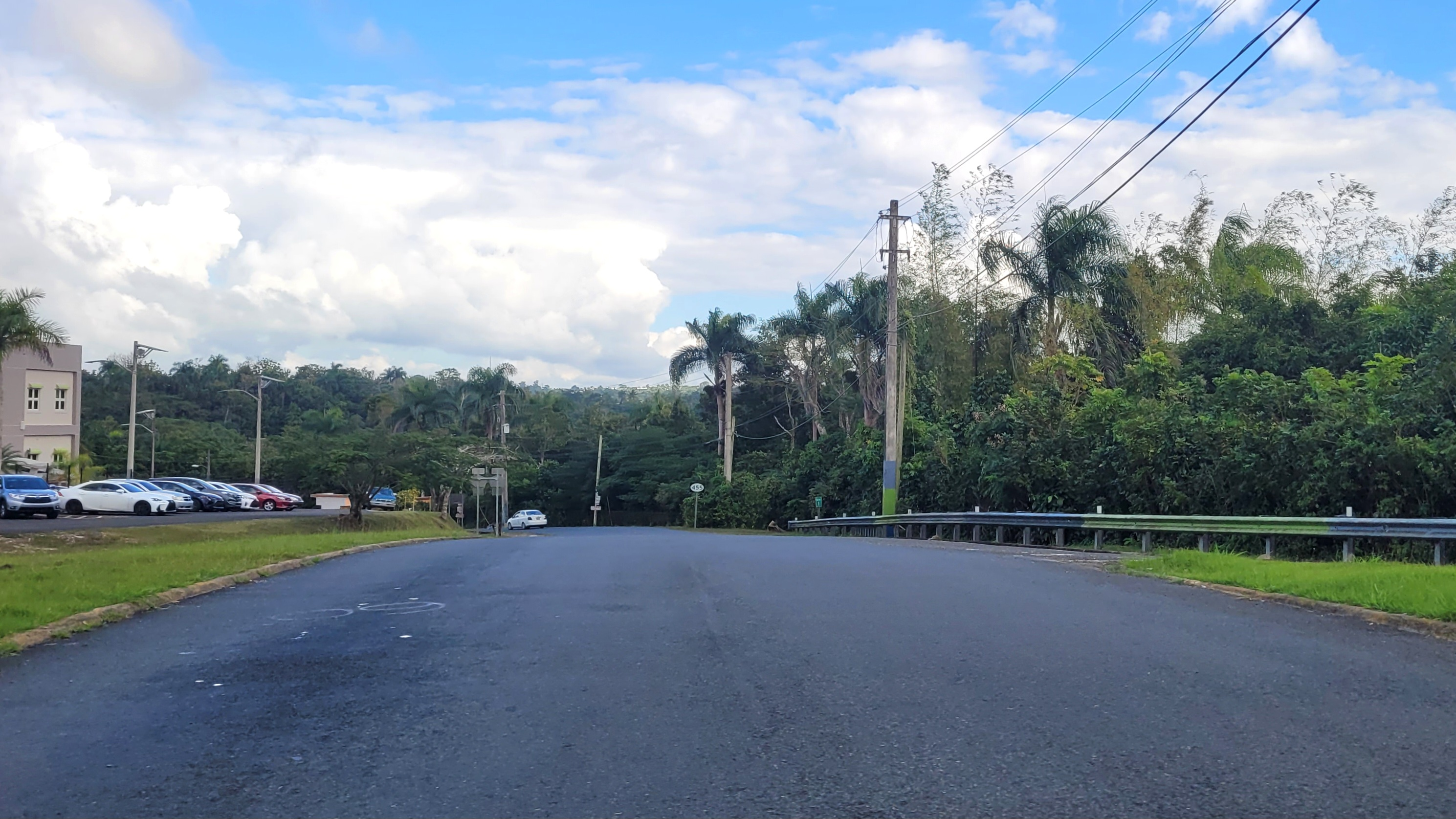
- Puerto Rico Highway 455 in Quebrada

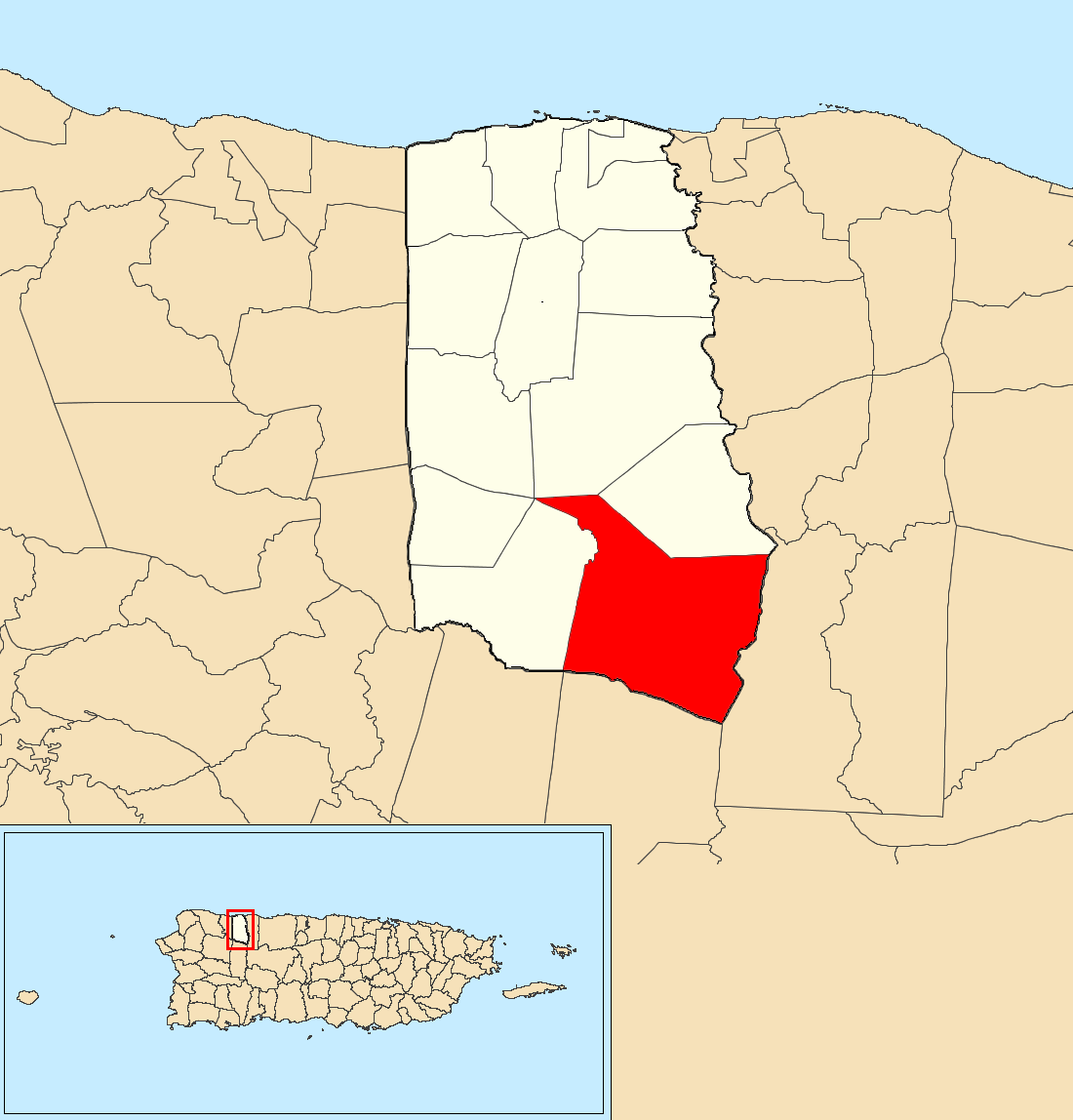
- Location of Quebrada within the municipality of Camuy shown in red

- Location of Puerto Rico
- Coordinates: 18°22′12″N 66°50′20″W
- Commonwealth: Puerto Rico
- Municipality: Camuy

Area
  - Total: 7.7 sq mi (20 km^{2})
  - Land: 7.7 sq mi (20 km^{2})
  - Water: 0 sq mi (0 km^{2})
- Elevation: 948 ft (289 m)

Population (2010)
  - Total: 3,813
  - Density: 495.2/sq mi (191.2/km^{2})
- Source: 2010 Census
- Time zone: UTC−4 (AST)

Quebrada is a barrio in the municipality of Camuy, Puerto Rico. Its population in 2010 was 3,813.

== History ==
Quebrada was in Spain's gazetteers until Puerto Rico was ceded by Spain in the aftermath of the Spanish–American War under the terms of the Treaty of Paris of 1898 and became an unincorporated territory of the United States. In 1899, the United States Department of War conducted a census of Puerto Rico finding that the population of Quebrada barrio was 1,213.

Historical population
| Census | Pop. | Note | %± |
|---|---|---|---|
| 1900 | 1,213 | | — |
| 1910 | 895 | | −26.2% |
| 1920 | 1,744 | | 94.9% |
| 1930 | 2,192 | | 25.7% |
| 1940 | 3,121 | | 42.4% |
| 1950 | 2,793 | | −10.5% |
| 1960 | 2,409 | | −13.7% |
| 1970 | 2,224 | | −7.7% |
| 1980 | 2,935 | | 32.0% |
| 1990 | 3,272 | | 11.5% |
| 2000 | 3,952 | | 20.8% |
| 2010 | 3,813 | | −3.5% |
U.S. Decennial Census; 1899 (shown as 1900) 1910-1930; 1930-1950 1980-2000 2010

== Gallery ==
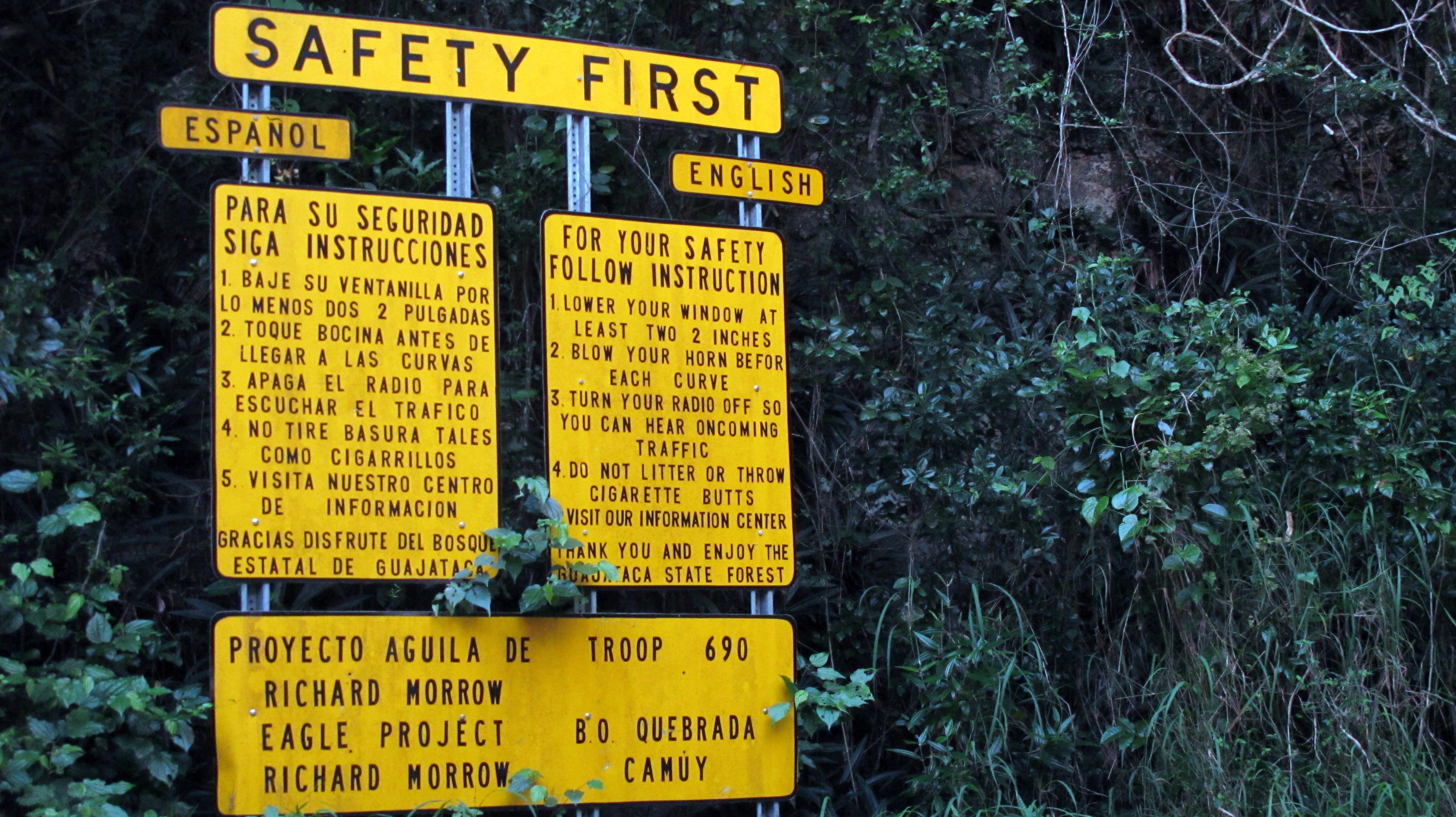
"For your safety" sign in Quebrada by Boy Scout Troup 690

== See also ==
- List of communities in Puerto Rico
