= Bayaney, Hatillo, Puerto Rico =

Barrio of Puerto Rico

Bayaney
- Barrio
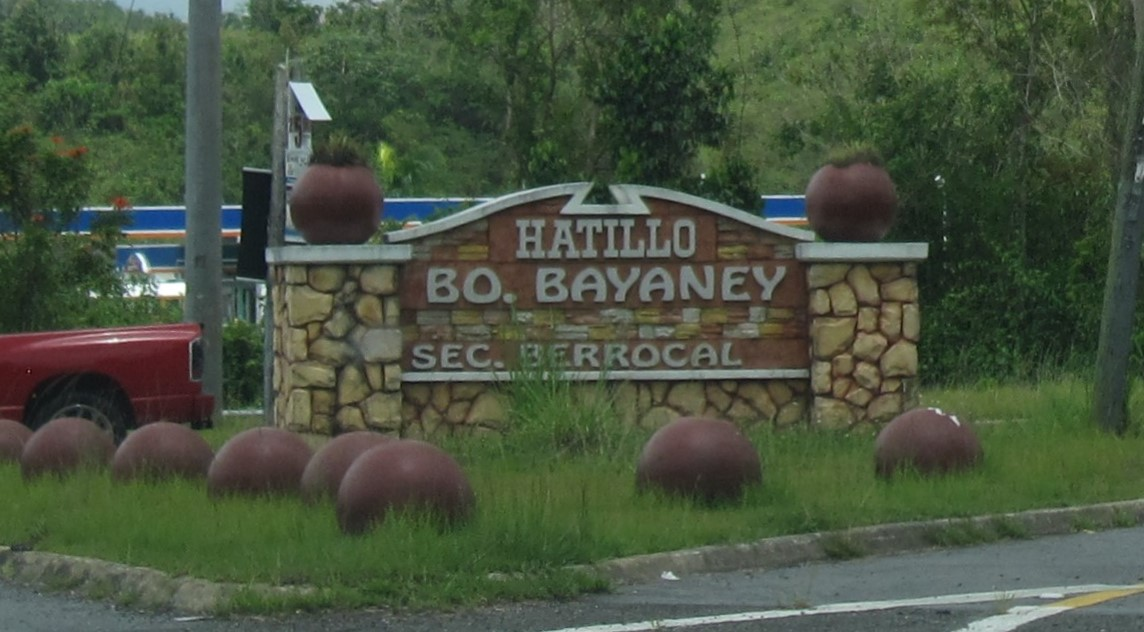
- Rock wall at entrance to Bayaney

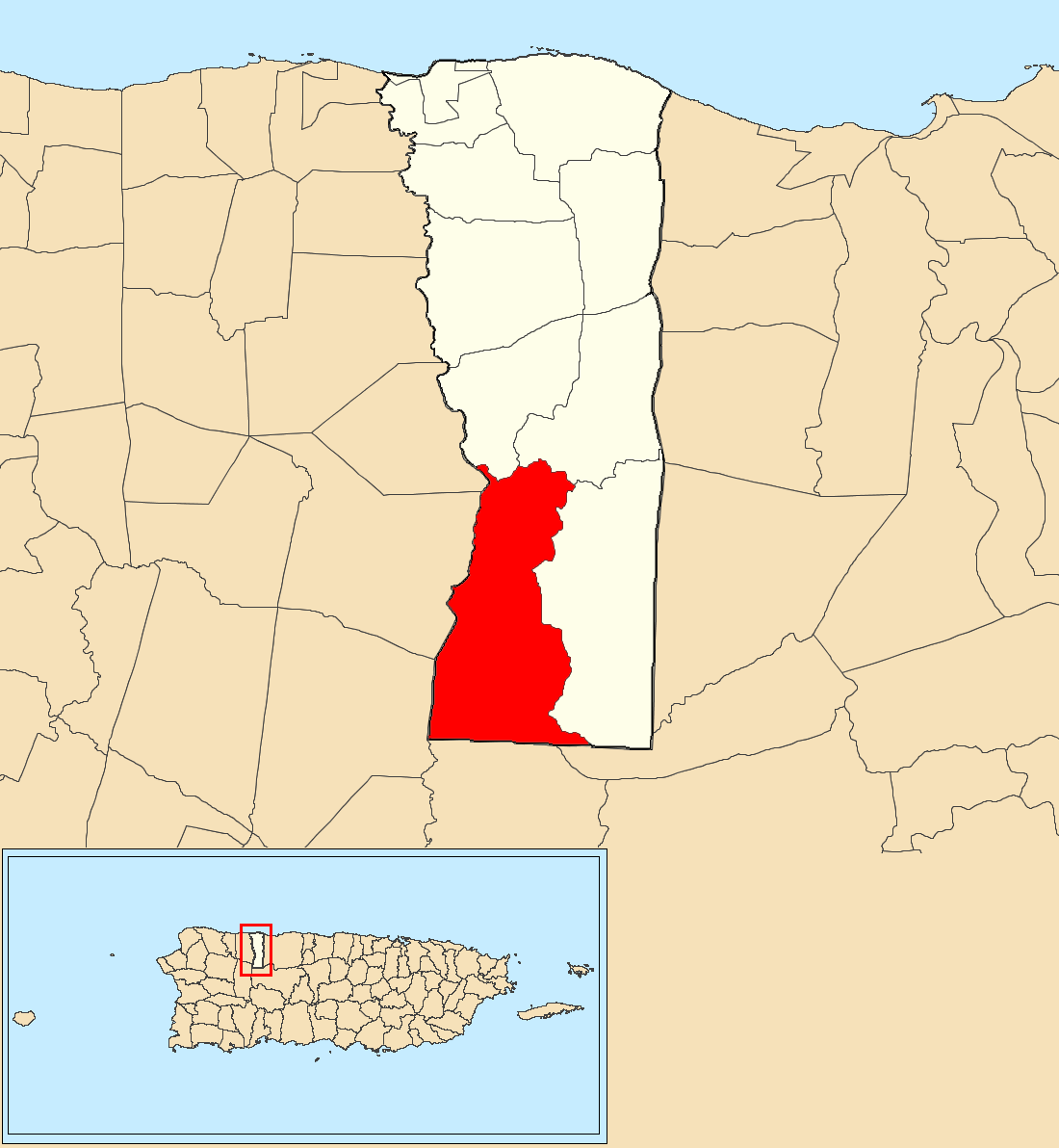
- Location of Bayaney within the municipality of Hatillo shown in red

- Location of Puerto Rico
- Coordinates: 18°21′09″N 66°48′24″W
- Commonwealth: Puerto Rico
- Municipality: Hatillo

Area
  - Total: 7.78 sq mi (20.2 km^{2})
  - Land: 7.78 sq mi (20.2 km^{2})
  - Water: 0 sq mi (0 km^{2})
- Elevation: 1,083 ft (330 m)

Population (2010)
  - Total: 3,550
  - Density: 456.3/sq mi (176.2/km^{2})
- Source: 2010 Census
- Time zone: UTC−4 (AST)

Bayaney is a rural barrio in the municipality of Hatillo, Puerto Rico. Its population in 2010 was 3,550.

Historical population
Census	Pop.	Note	%±
1900	1,394		—
1910	1,547		11.0%
1920	2,603		68.3%
1930	2,883		10.8%
1940	3,063		6.2%
1950	3,542		15.6%
1960	2,709		−23.5%
1970	2,068		−23.7%
1980	2,382		15.2%
1990	2,840		19.2%
2000	3,373		18.8%
2010	3,550		5.2%
U.S. Decennial Census; 1899 (shown as 1900) 1910-1930; 1930-1950 1980-2000 2010

== Description ==
Puerto Rico Highway 487 travels through Bayaney.

== History ==
Bayaney was in Spain's gazetteers until Puerto Rico was ceded by Spain in the aftermath of the Spanish–American War under the terms of the Treaty of Paris of 1898 and became an unincorporated territory of the United States. In 1899, the United States Department of War conducted a census of Puerto Rico finding that the population of Bayaney barrio was 1,394.

== Gallery ==
Homes and street as one is traveling south to north on PR-487 in Bayaney:

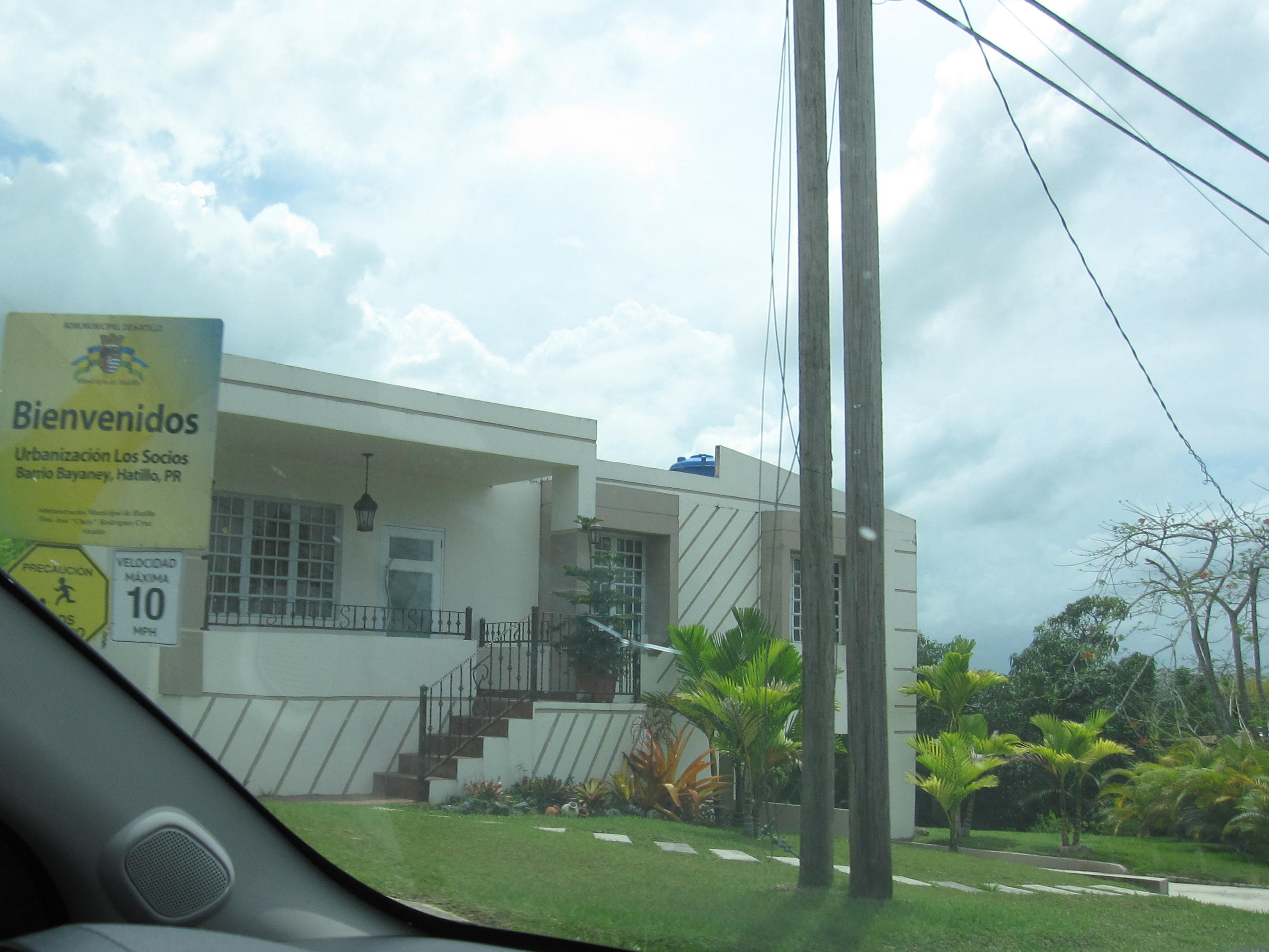

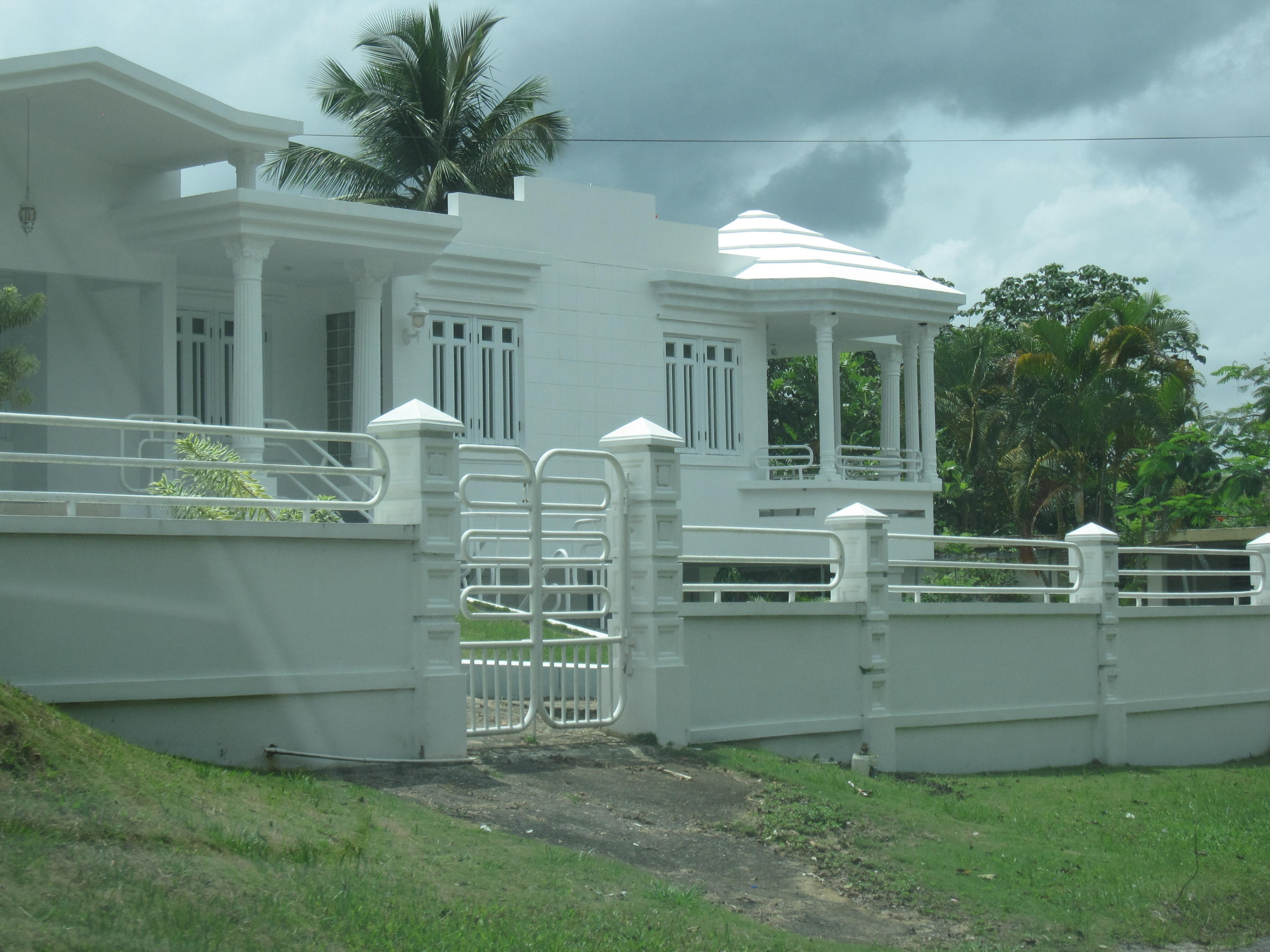

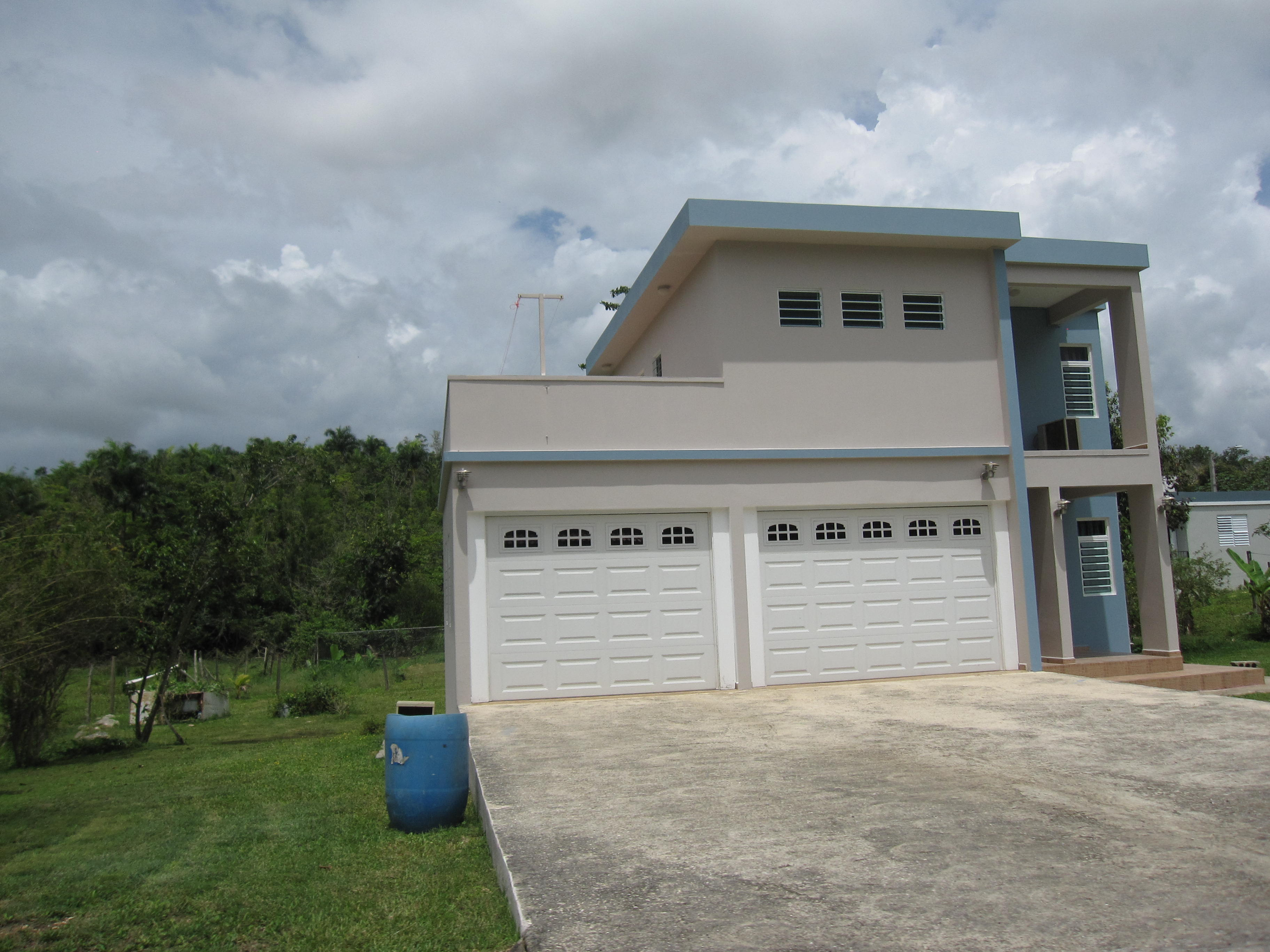

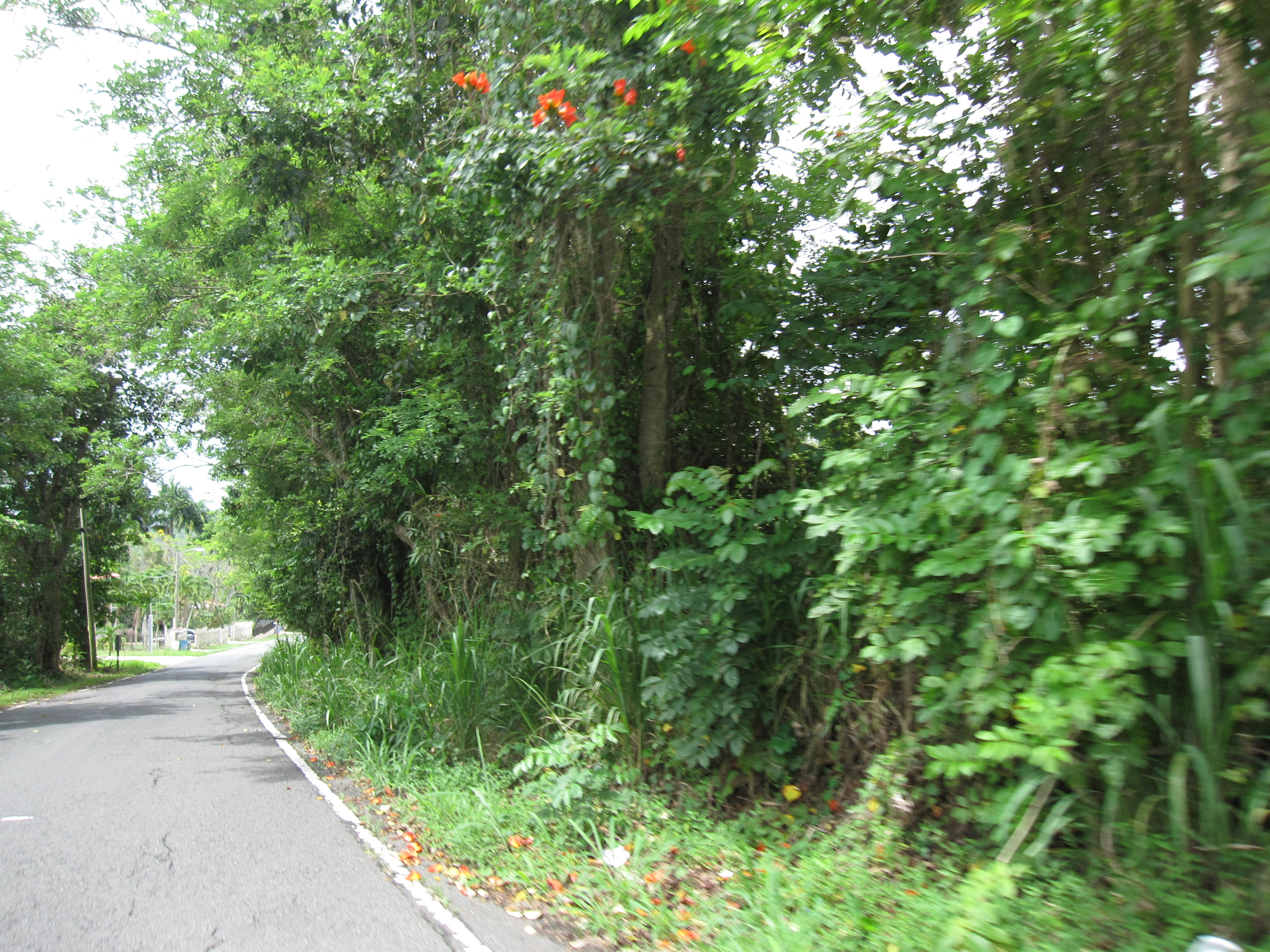

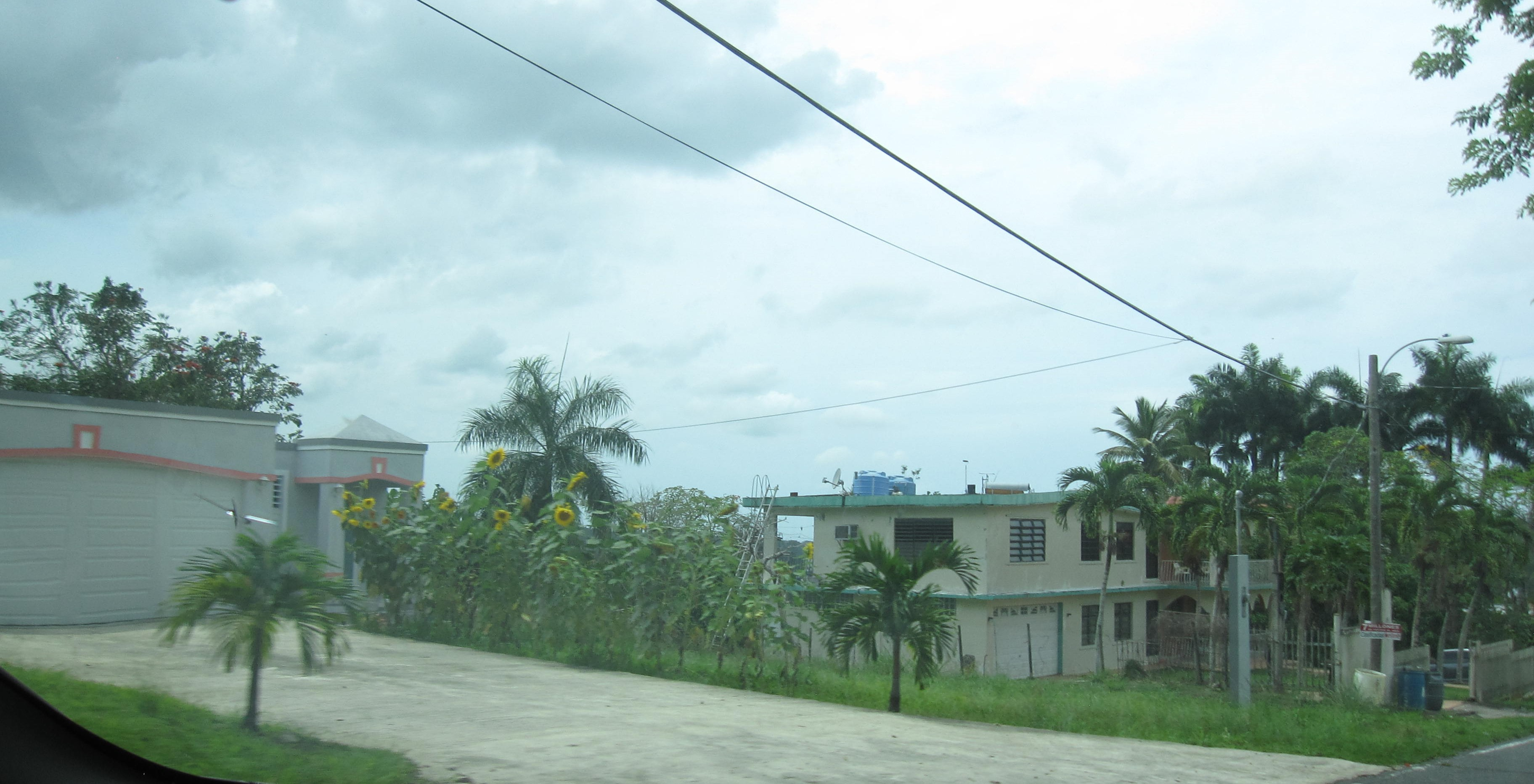

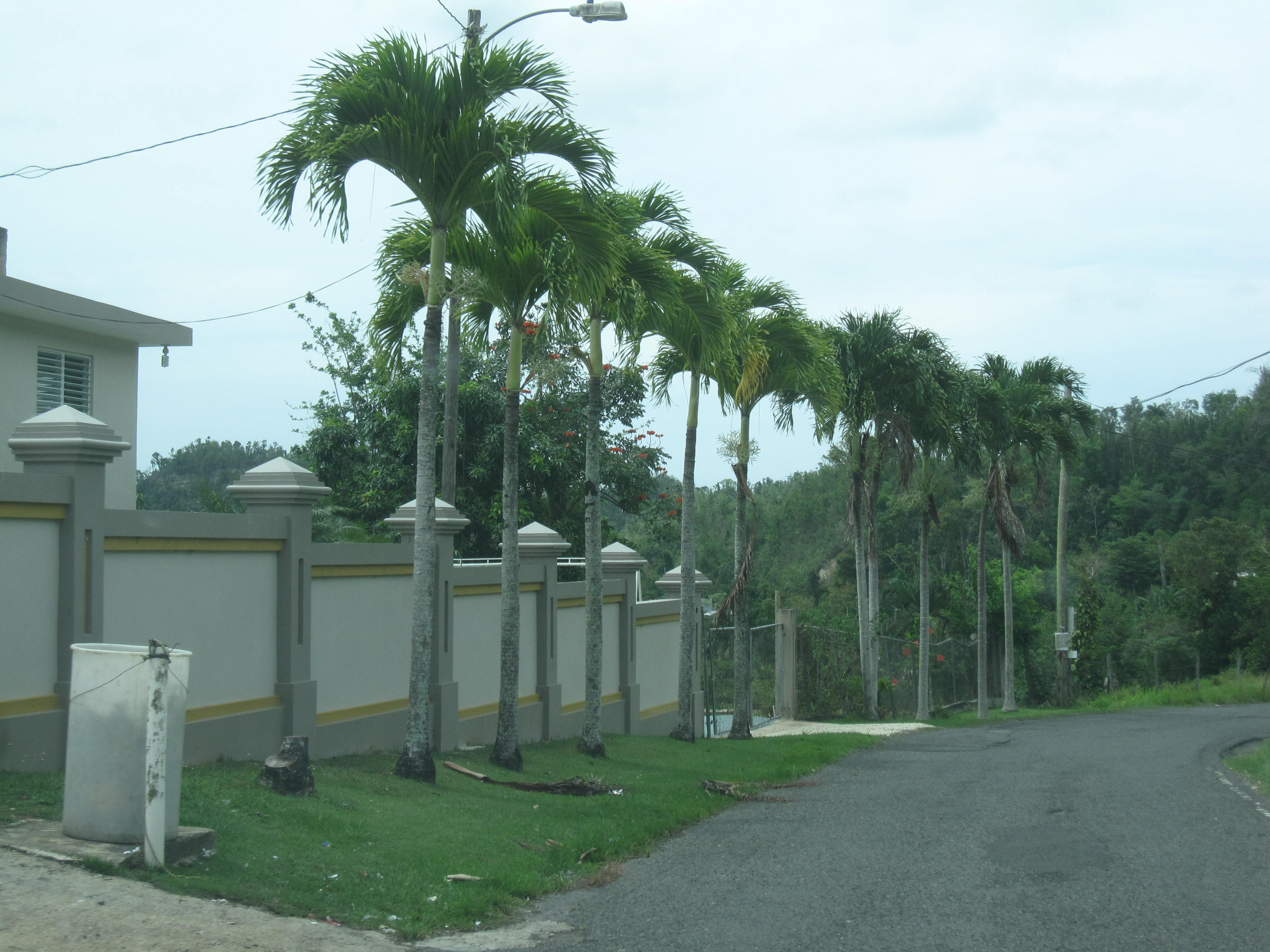

== See also ==
- List of communities in Puerto Rico
