= Buenos Aires, Lares, Puerto Rico =

Barrio of Puerto Rico

Buenos Aires
- Barrio
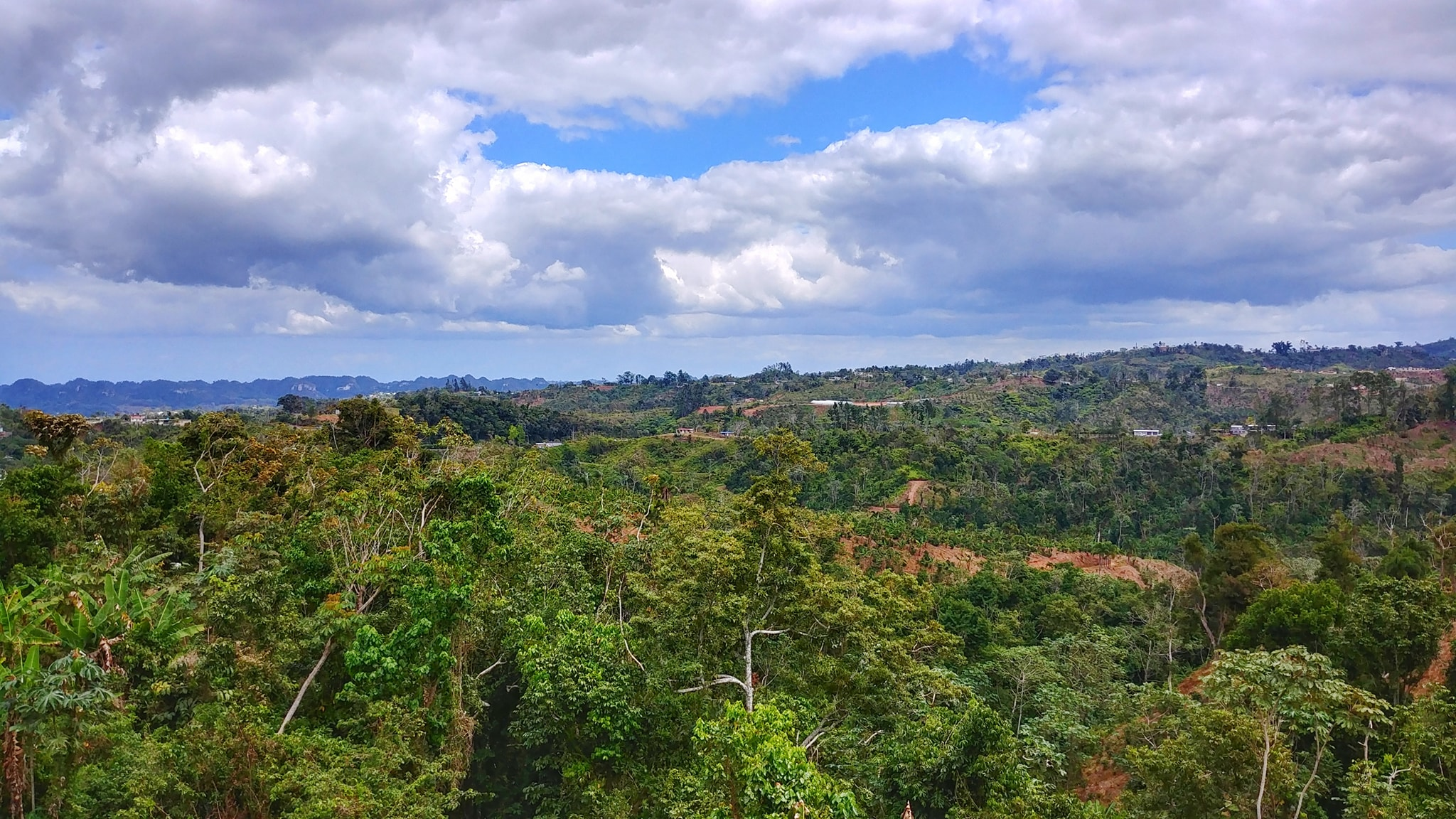
- Hills in Buenos Aires

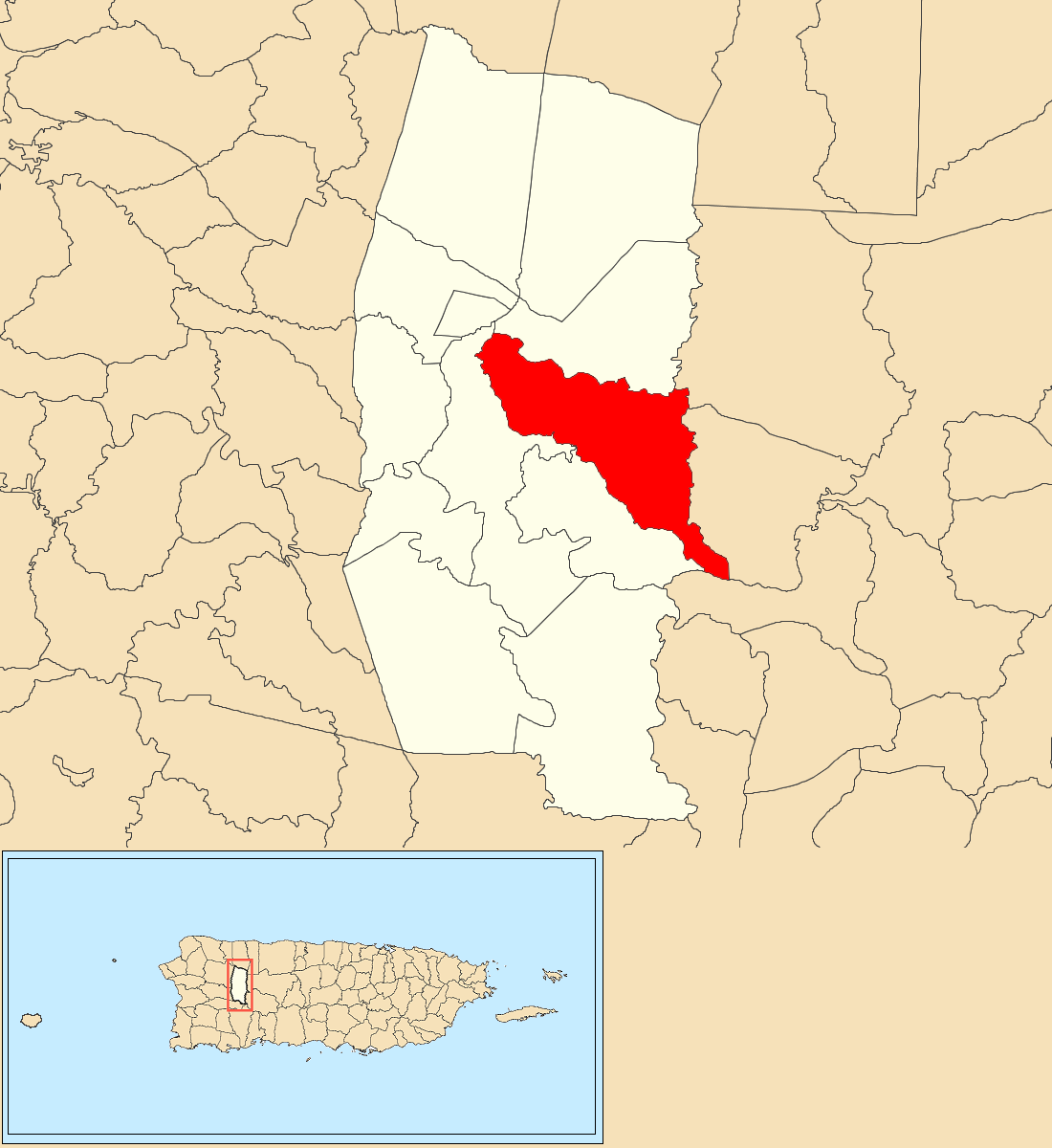
- Location of Buenos Aires barrio within the municipality of Lares shown in red

- Location of Puerto Rico
- Coordinates: 18°15′51″N 66°50′42″W
- Commonwealth: Puerto Rico
- Municipality: Lares

Area
  - Total: 6 sq mi (16 km^{2})
  - Land: 6 sq mi (16 km^{2})
  - Water: 0 sq mi (0 km^{2})
- Elevation: 1,516 ft (462 m)

Population (2010)
  - Total: 2,291
  - Density: 381.8/sq mi (147.4/km^{2})
- Source: 2010 Census
- Time zone: UTC−4 (AST)

Buenos Aires is a barrio in the municipality of Lares, Puerto Rico. Its population in 2010 was 2,291.

== History ==
Buenos Aires was in Spain's gazetteers until Puerto Rico was ceded by Spain in the aftermath of the Spanish–American War under the terms of the Treaty of Paris of 1898 and became an unincorporated territory of the United States. In 1899, the United States Department of War conducted a census of Puerto Rico finding that the population of Buenos Aires barrio was 1,449.

Historical population
Census	Pop.	Note	%±
1900	1,449		—
1910	1,430		−1.3%
1920	1,918		34.1%
1930	1,599		−16.6%
1940	1,909		19.4%
1950	1,815		−4.9%
1960	1,865		2.8%
1970	1,944		4.2%
1980	2,158		11.0%
1990	2,344		8.6%
2000	3,060		30.5%
2010	2,291		−25.1%
U.S. Decennial Census; 1899 (shown as 1900) 1910-1930; 1930-1950 1980-2000 2010

== Sectors ==
Barrios (which are, in contemporary times, roughly comparable to minor civil divisions) and subbarrios, in turn, are further subdivided into smaller local populated place areas/units called sectores (sectors in English). The types of sectores may vary, from normally sector to urbanización to reparto to barriada to residencial, among others.

The following sectors are in Buenos Aires barrio:

Carretera Acueducto, Finca Magraner, Hacienda Delgado, La Pepa, Sector Alto Grande, Sector Jobos Mario, Sector Jobos, Sector La América, Sector La Gloria, Sector La Matilde, Sector Matías, Sector Miján, Sector Morell, Sector Palmasola, Sector Tostero, Tramo Carretera 128, and Tramo Carretera 129.

== Gallery ==
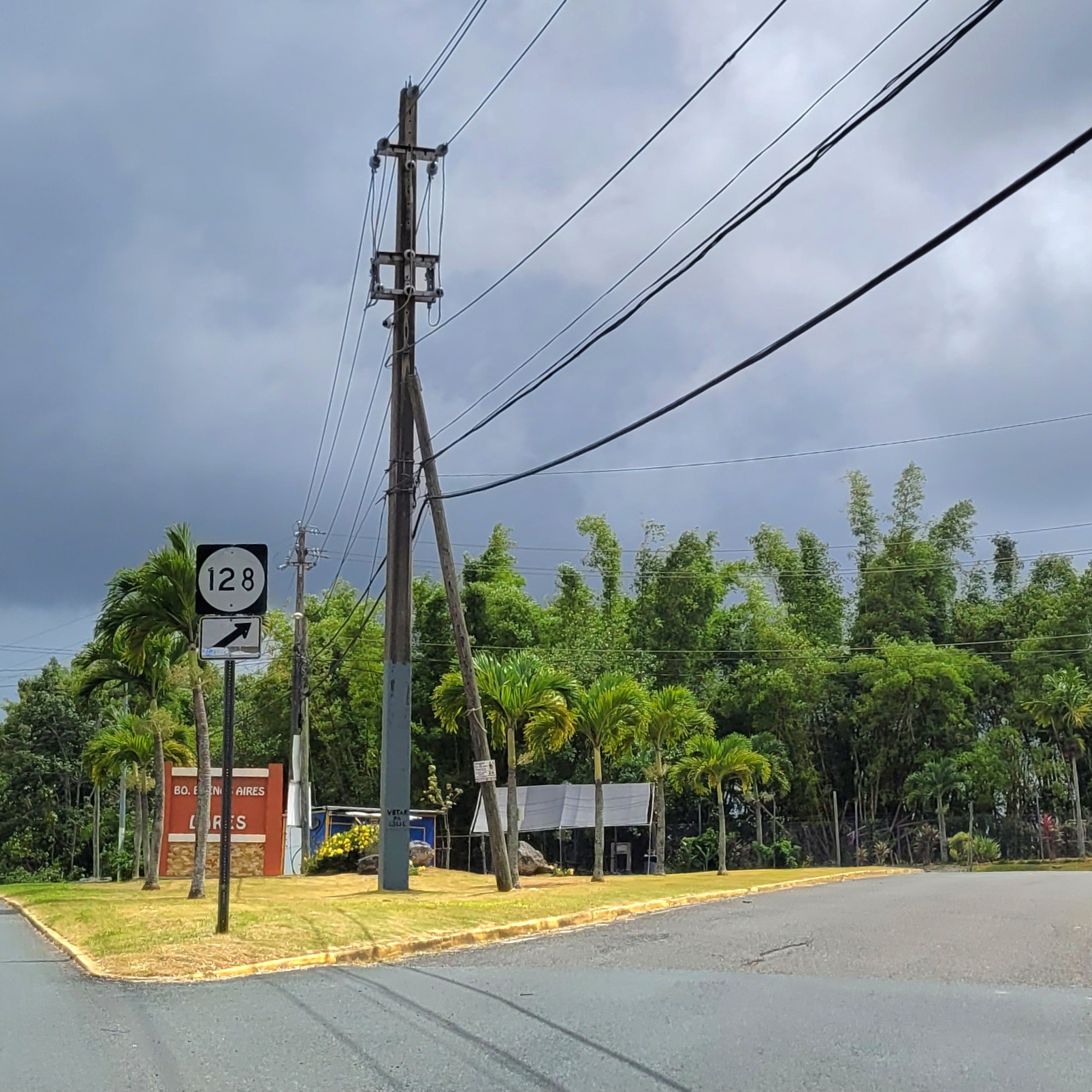
PR-129 at PR-128 intersection between Buenos Aires and Mirasol barrios

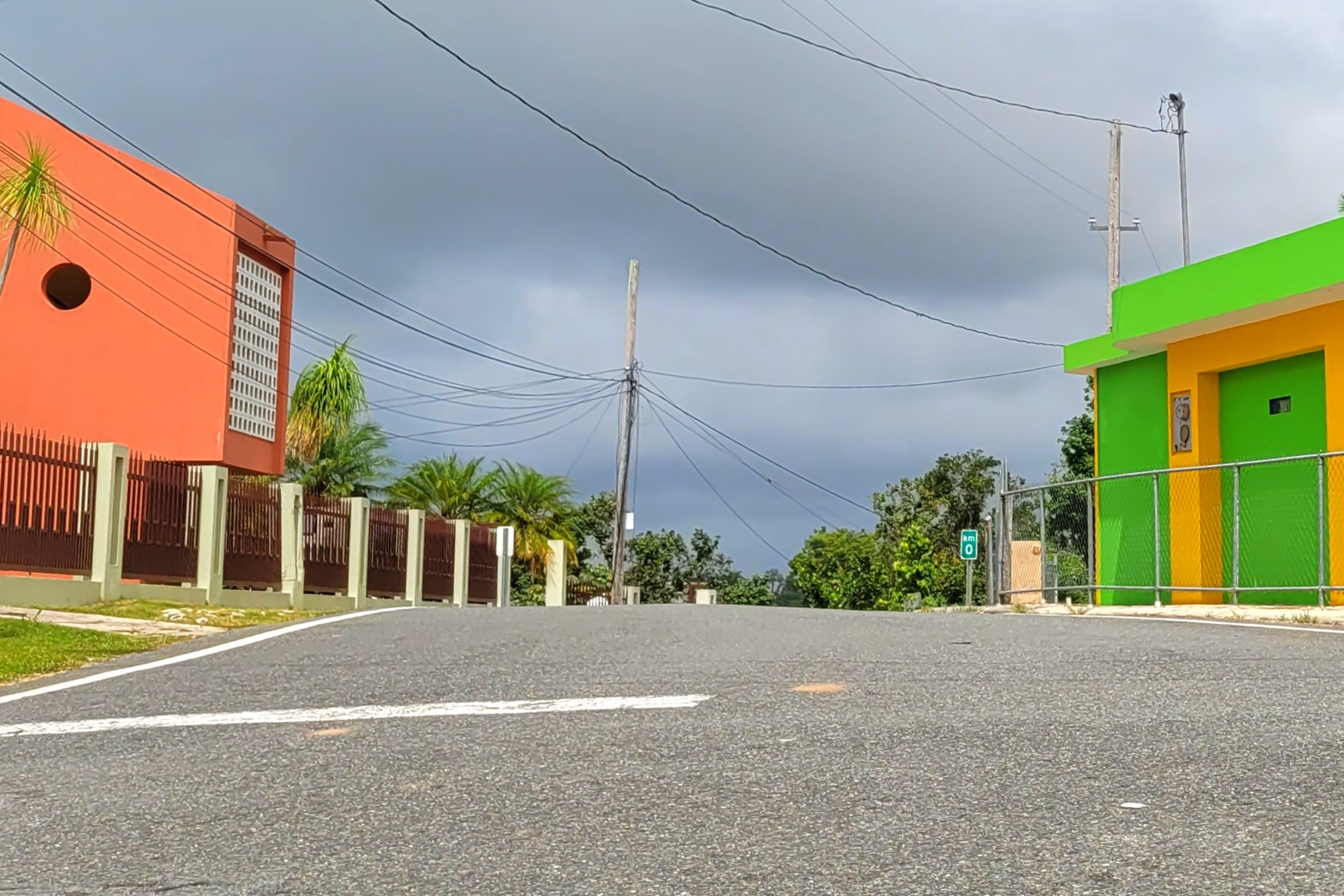
PR-415 in Buenos Aires

== See also ==
- List of communities in Puerto Rico
- List of barrios and sectors of Lares, Puerto Rico
