= Lares Ice Cream Parlor =

Legendary ice cream shop in Lares, Puerto Rico

Coordinates: 18.294965°N 66.877387°W

Heladería de Lares

The Lares Ice Cream Parlor (Spanish: Heladería de Lares) is an ice cream store located in the town of Lares, Puerto Rico.

The ice cream store was founded in 1968 by Salvador Barreto (known as "Yinyo") and has created over 200 flavors.

The ice cream store is located in front of the town square of Lares. It closed at the end of February 2014, due to the death of its founder and re-opened in March 2017. It is open 7 days a week and offers around 50 different ice cream flavors on a regular basis.

== Influence ==
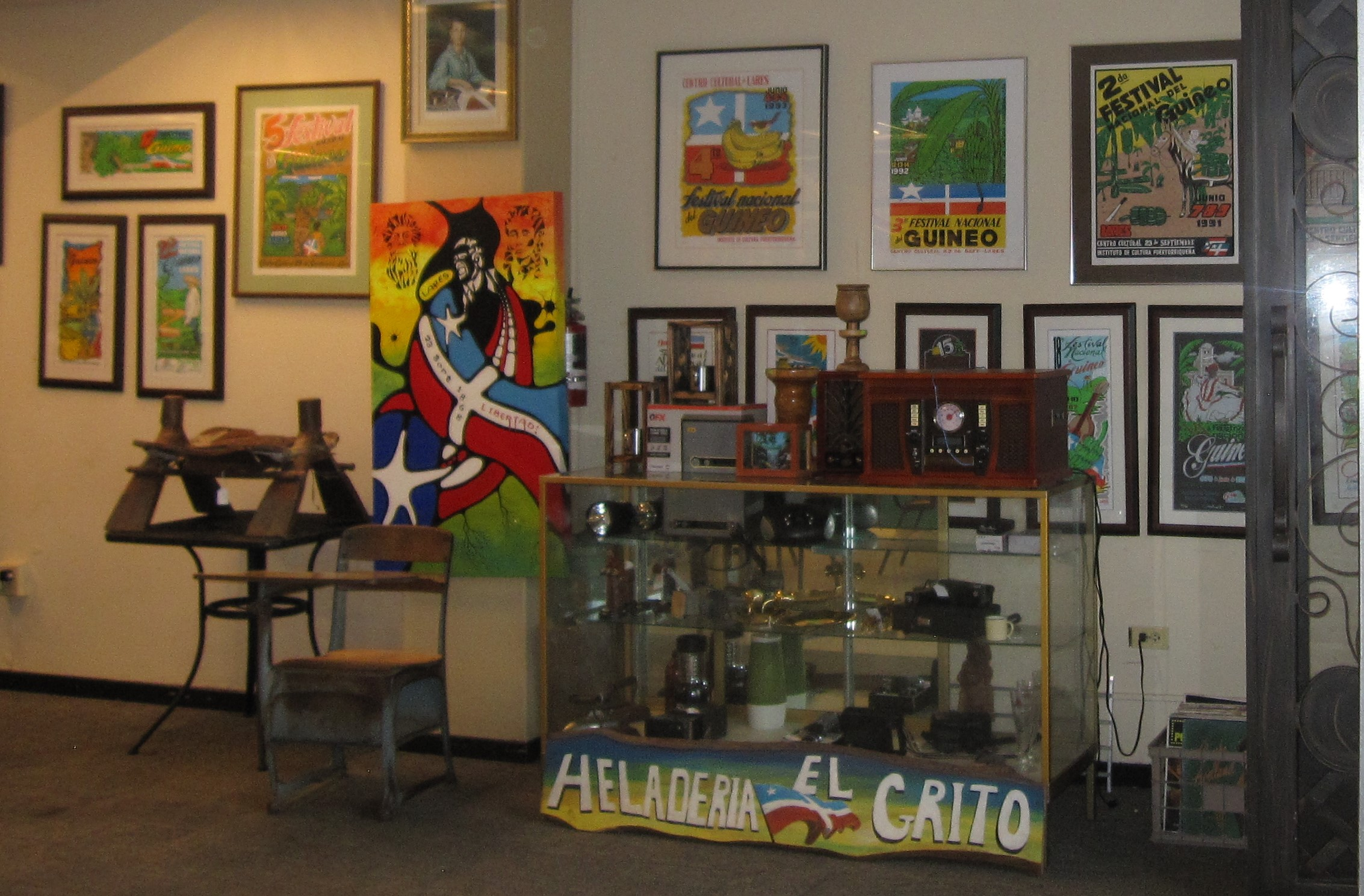
Heladería El Grito, owned by José Rodríguez Ruiz (2019 Mayor of Lares), is next to Heladería de Lares.

Another ice cream shop, Heladería El Grito, is next door. After Hurricane Maria, some Puerto Rican expatriates opened similar shops in Central Florida.

== See also ==
- List of Puerto Rico landmarks
