= Río Prieto, Lares, Puerto Rico =

Barrio of Puerto Rico

Río Prieto
- Barrio
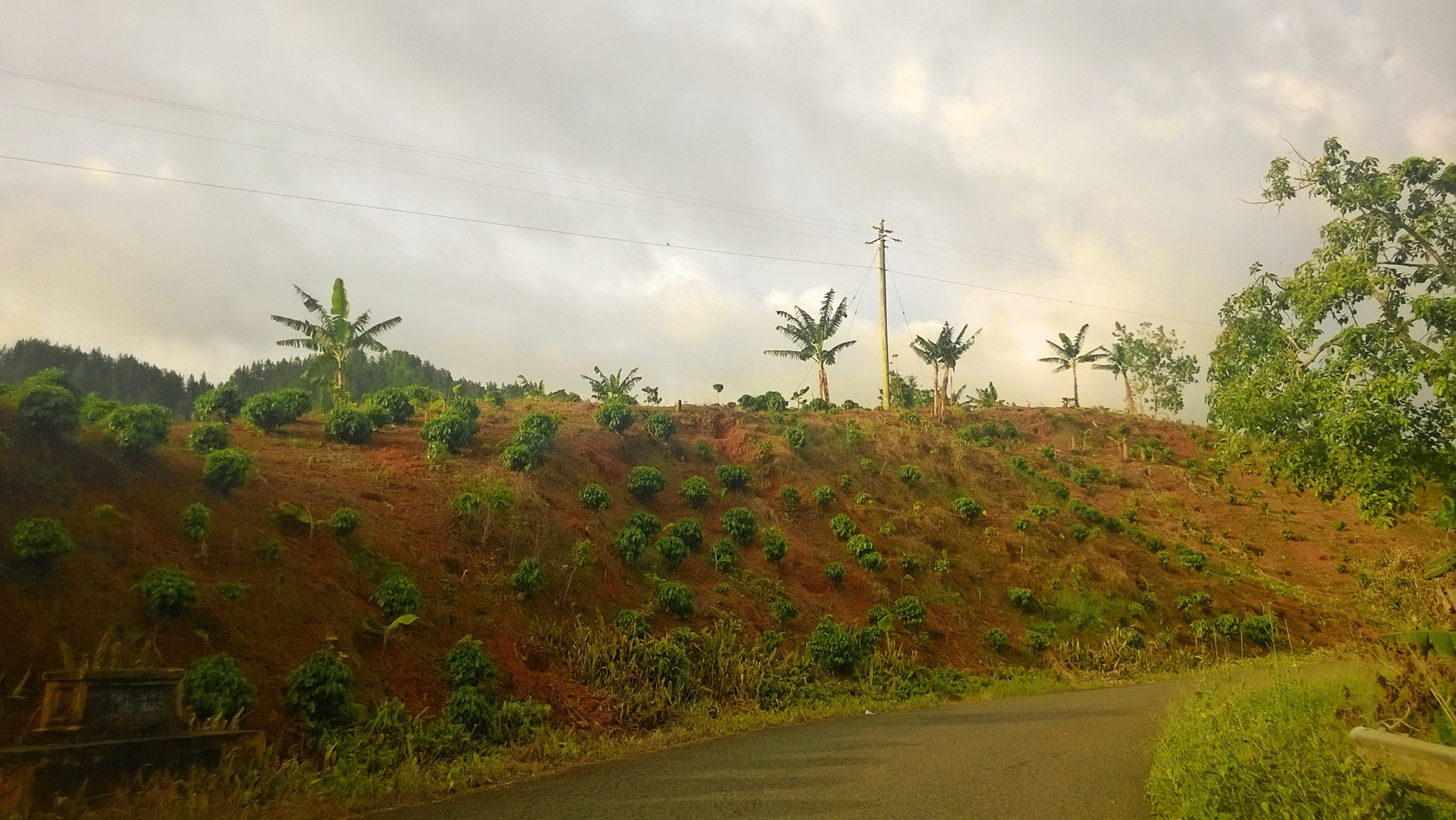
- Puerto Rico Highway 431 in Río Prieto

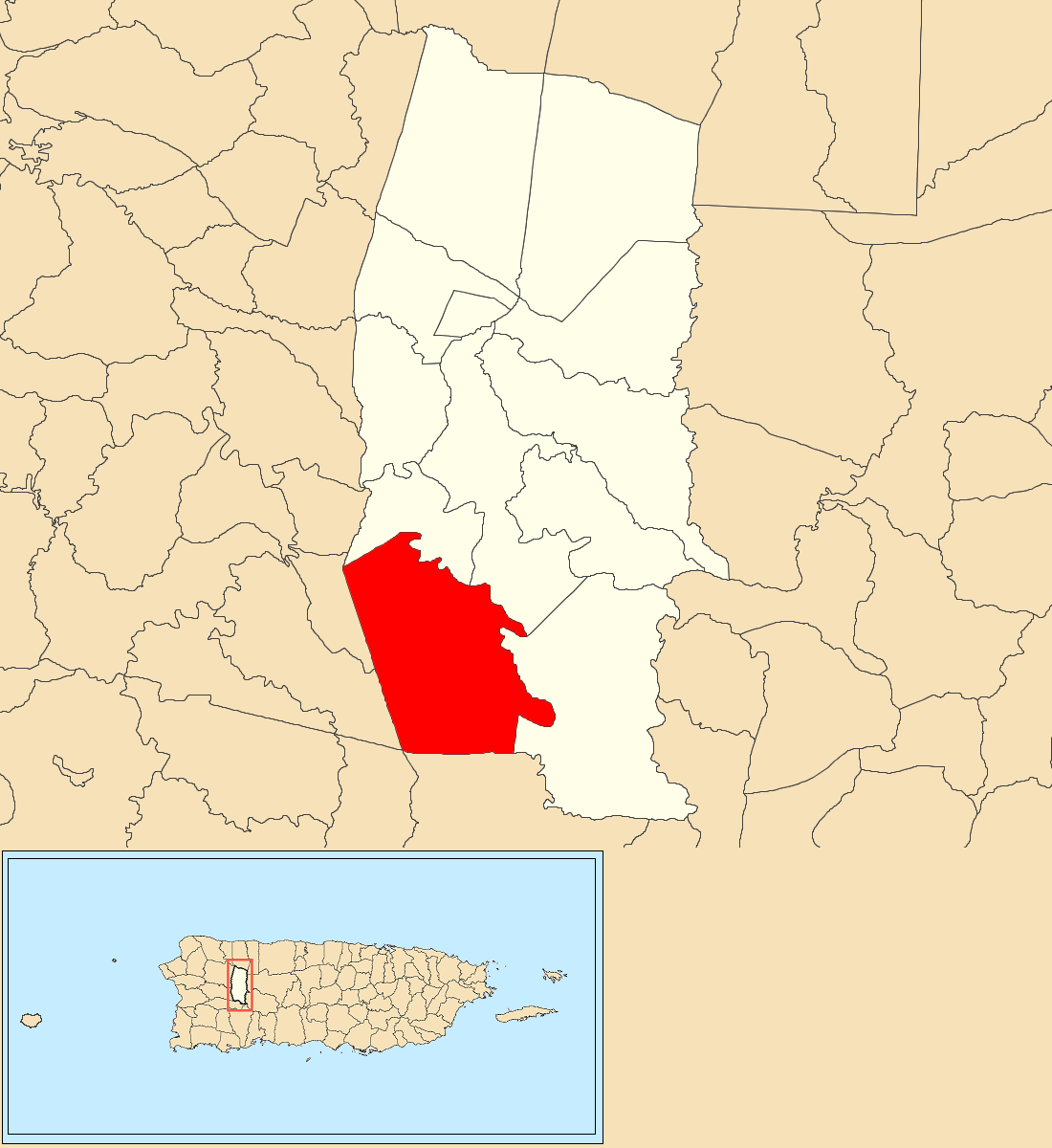
- Location of Río Prieto barrio within the municipality of Lares shown in red

- Location of Puerto Rico
- Coordinates: 18°12′43″N 66°53′20″W
- Commonwealth: Puerto Rico
- Municipality: Lares

Area
  - Total: 7.62 sq mi (19.7 km^{2})
  - Land: 7.62 sq mi (19.7 km^{2})
  - Water: 0 sq mi (0 km^{2})
- Elevation: 1,552 ft (473 m)

Population (2010)
  - Total: 567
  - Density: 74.4/sq mi (28.7/km^{2})
- Source: 2010 Census
- Time zone: UTC−4 (AST)

Río Prieto is a barrio in the municipality of Lares, Puerto Rico. Its population in 2010 was 567.

== History ==
Río Prieto was in Spain's gazetteers until Puerto Rico was ceded by Spain in the aftermath of the Spanish–American War under the terms of the Treaty of Paris of 1898 and became an unincorporated territory of the United States. In 1899, the United States Department of War conducted a census of Puerto Rico finding that the population of Río Prieto barrio was 1,931.

Historical population
Census	Pop.	Note	%±
1900	1,931		—
1910	2,068		7.1%
1920	2,077		0.4%
1930	1,800		−13.3%
1940	1,688		−6.2%
1950	1,400		−17.1%
1960	1,127		−19.5%
1970	1,014		−10.0%
1980	935		−7.8%
1990	863		−7.7%
2000	559		−35.2%
2010	567		1.4%
U.S. Decennial Census; 1899 (shown as 1900) 1910-1930; 1930-1950 1980-2000 2010

== Sectors ==
Barrios (which are, in contemporary times, roughly comparable to minor civil divisions) and subbarrios, in turn, are further subdivided into smaller local populated place areas/units called sectores (sectors in English). The types of sectores may vary, from normally sector to urbanización to reparto to barriada to residencial, among others.

The following sectors are in Río Prieto barrio:

Camino Ballester Camino Rullán, Cerro Malo, Sector Boquilla, Sector La Monserrate, Sector Los Márquez, Sector Vélez, Sector Vilella and Tramo Carretera 431.

== See also ==
- List of communities in Puerto Rico
- List of barrios and sectors of Lares, Puerto Rico
