= Callejones =

Barrio of Lares, Puerto Rico

- Barrio
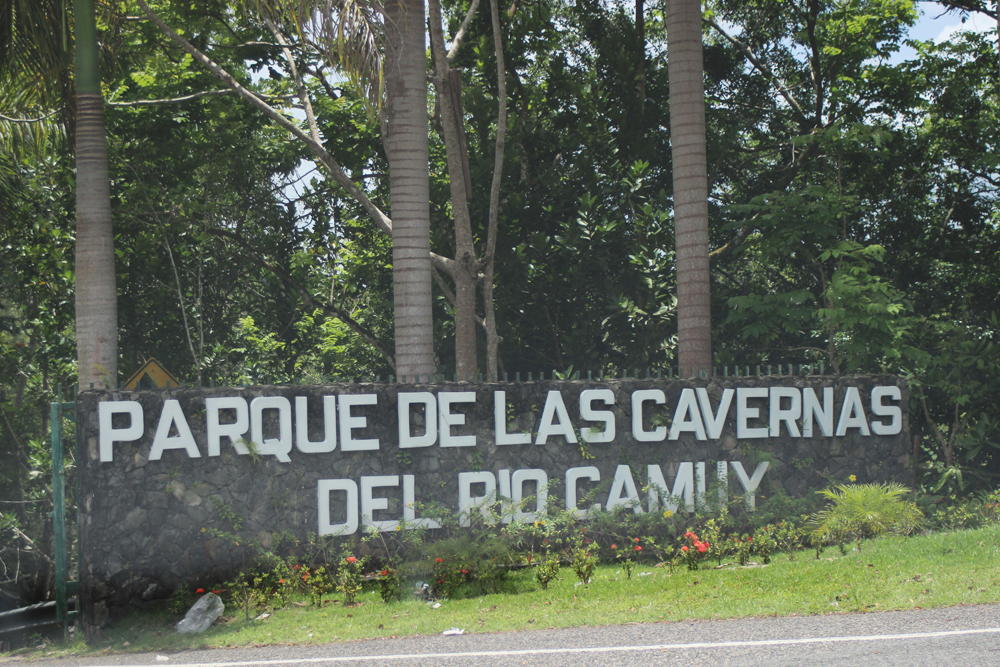
- An entrance to the Camuy River Cave Park in Callejones

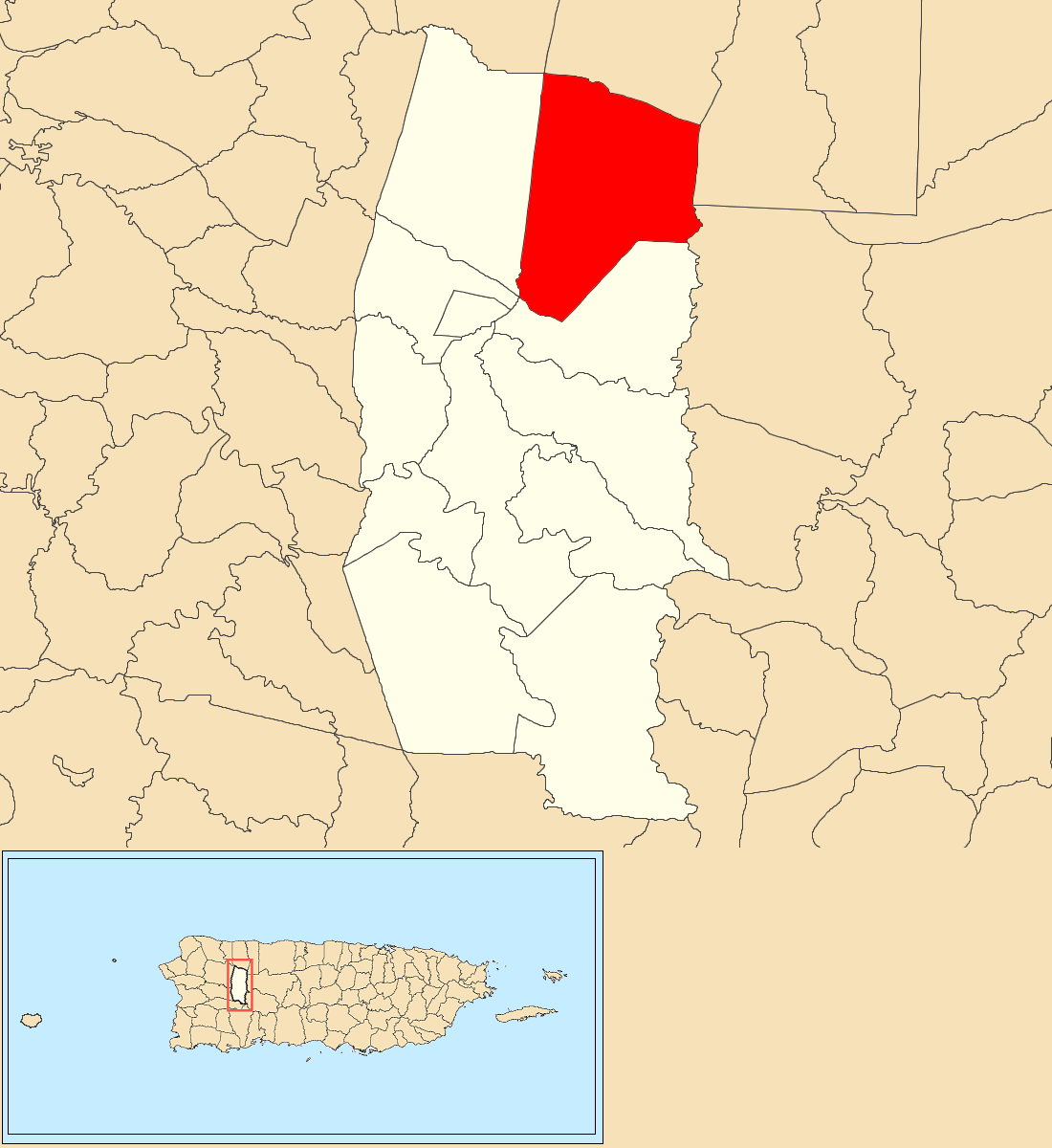
- Location of Callejones barrio within the municipality of Lares shown in red

- Location of Puerto Rico
- Coordinates: 18°19′38″N 66°50′56″W
- Commonwealth: Puerto Rico
- Municipality: Lares

Area
  - Total: 8.39 sq mi (21.7 km^{2})
  - Land: 8.39 sq mi (21.7 km^{2})
  - Water: 0 sq mi (0 km^{2})
- Elevation: 1,207 ft (368 m)

Population (2010)
  - Total: 4,575
  - Density: 545.3/sq mi (210.5/km^{2})
- Source: 2010 Census
- Time zone: UTC−4 (AST)

Callejones is a barrio in the municipality of Lares, Puerto Rico. Its population in 2010 was 4,575. Machos Cave (Spanish: Cueva Machos) and Pajita Cave (Spanish: Cueva Pajita) are located in Callejones.

== History ==
Callejones was in Spain's gazetteers until Puerto Rico was ceded by Spain in the aftermath of the Spanish–American War under the terms of the Treaty of Paris of 1898 and became an unincorporated territory of the United States. In 1899, the United States Department of War conducted a census of Puerto Rico finding that the population of Callejones barrio was 2,152.

Historical population
Census	Pop.	Note	%±
1900	2,152		—
1910	2,351		9.2%
1920	2,411		2.6%
1930	2,855		18.4%
1940	3,357		17.6%
1950	3,798		13.1%
1960	2,958		−22.1%
1970	2,412		−18.5%
1980	2,765		14.6%
1990	3,584		29.6%
2000	4,361		21.7%
2010	4,575		4.9%
U.S. Decennial Census; 1899 (shown as 1900) 1910-1930; 1930-1950 1980-2000 2010

== Sectors ==
Barrios (which are, in contemporary times, roughly comparable to minor civil divisions) and subbarrios, in turn, are further subdivided into smaller local populated place areas/units called sectores (sectors in English). The types of sectores may vary, from normally sector to urbanización to reparto to barriada to residencial, among others.

The following sectors are in Callejones barrio:

Arco Iris, Berrocal, Camino Emau, Camino Julito Nieves, Carmelo Mercado, Copa de Oro, Demetrio Otaño, El Maná, Las Lajas, Los Adames, Los Chayotes, Los Luciano, Los Otaño, Miro Torres, Monchín Rivera, Sector Crematorio, Sector Cueva Pajita, Sector El 21, Sector El Taino, Sector Gregorio Rivera, Sector La Gallera, Sector La Pista, Sector La Sierra, Sector Las Campanas, Sector León Vega, Sector Los Nieves, Sector Los Santiago, Sector Pagán, Sector Pedro Colón, Sector Zenón Rivera, Sico Torres, Tramo Carretera 129, Tramo Carretera 134, and Tramo Carretera 454.

== Archeological site ==
An archeological site consisting of a batey (a large clearing where ceremonies took place) is located in Callejones. It is of the Early Ostionoid (pre-Taino) (AD 600–1200) and Late Ostionoid (Taino) (AD 1200–1500) prehistoric eras and has been researched by Jose Oliver, a researcher from Yale University, and Samuel Kirkland Lothrop.

== Gallery ==
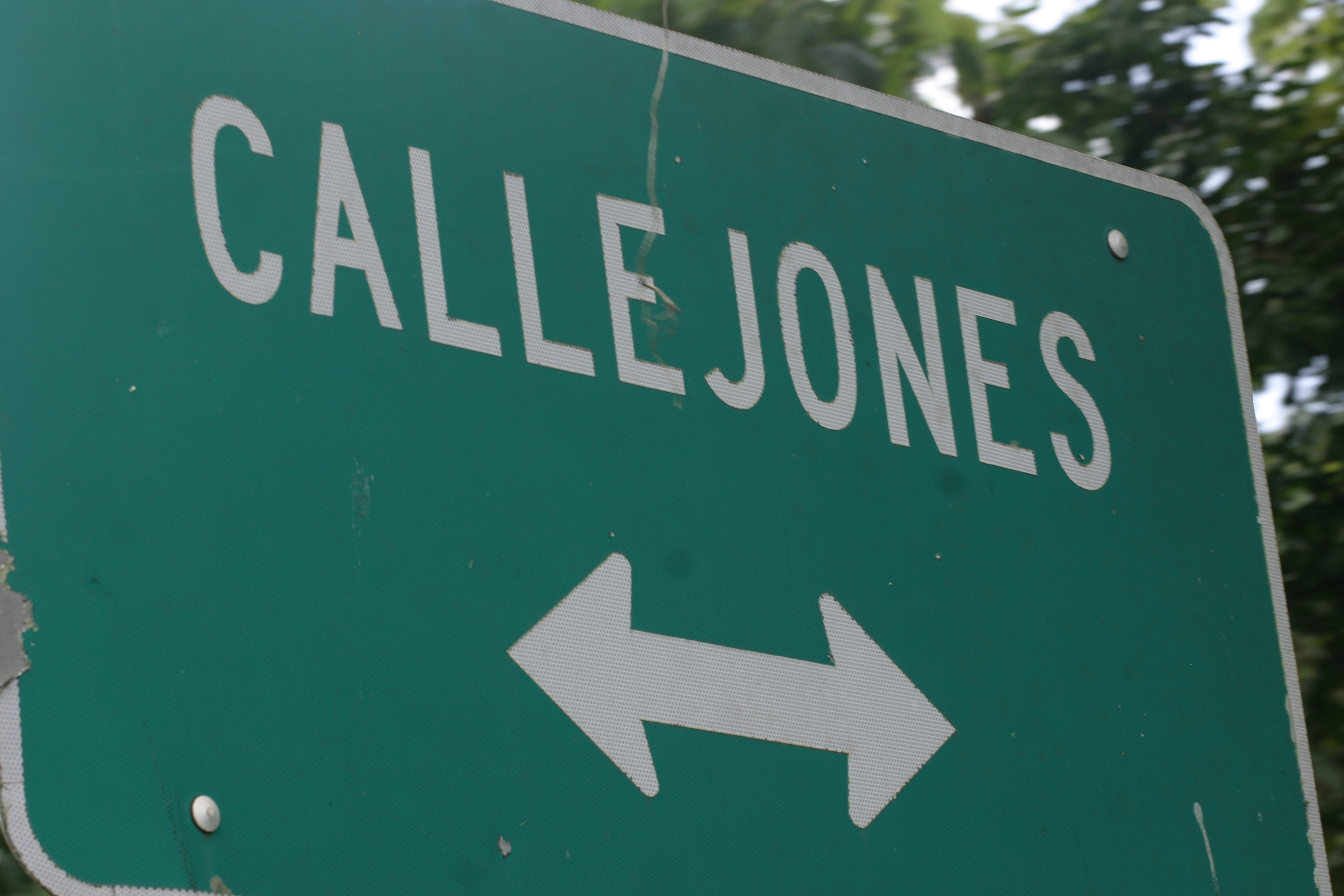
Sign for Callejones

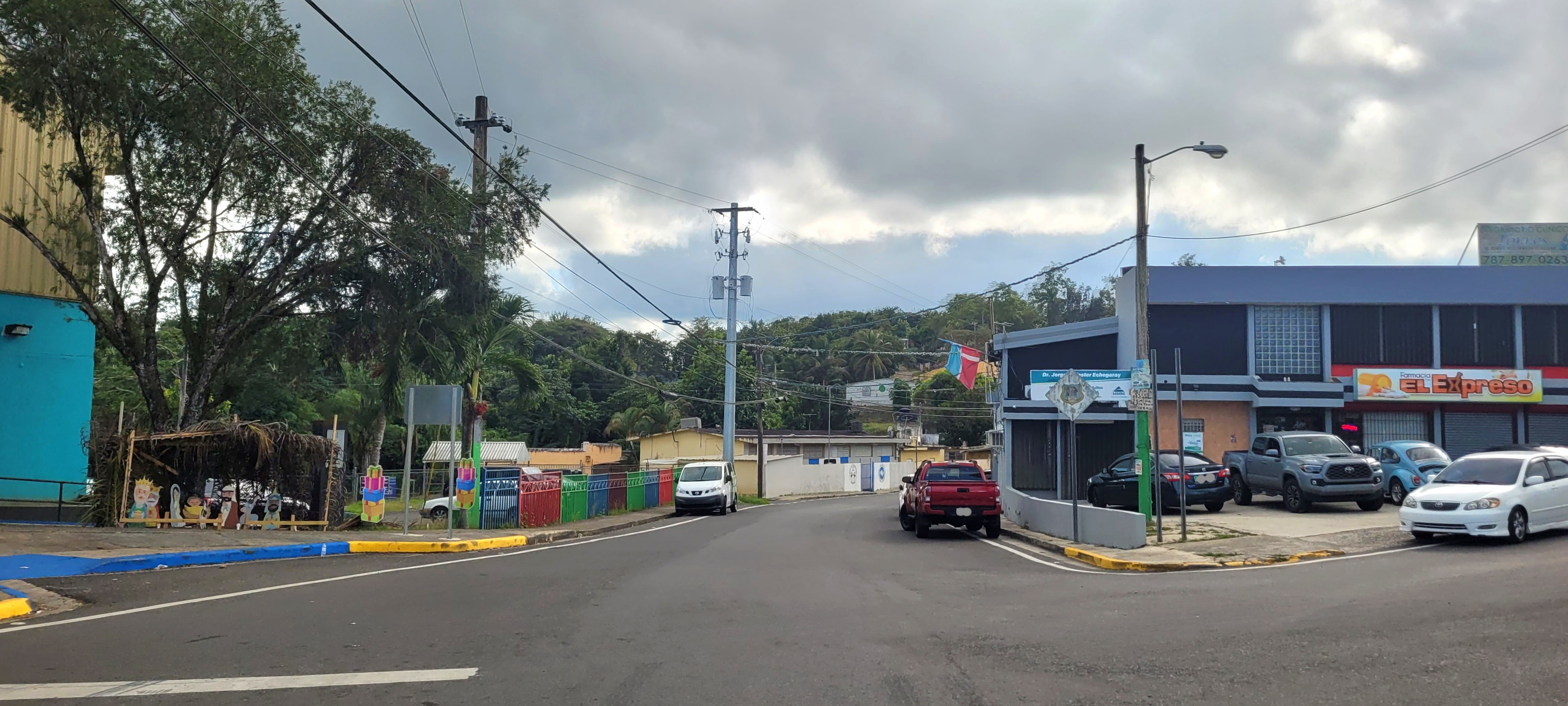
Puerto Rico Highway 454 in Callejones

== See also ==
- List of communities in Puerto Rico
- List of barrios and sectors of Lares, Puerto Rico
