= Lares, Lares, Puerto Rico =

Barrio of Puerto Rico

Lares
- Barrio
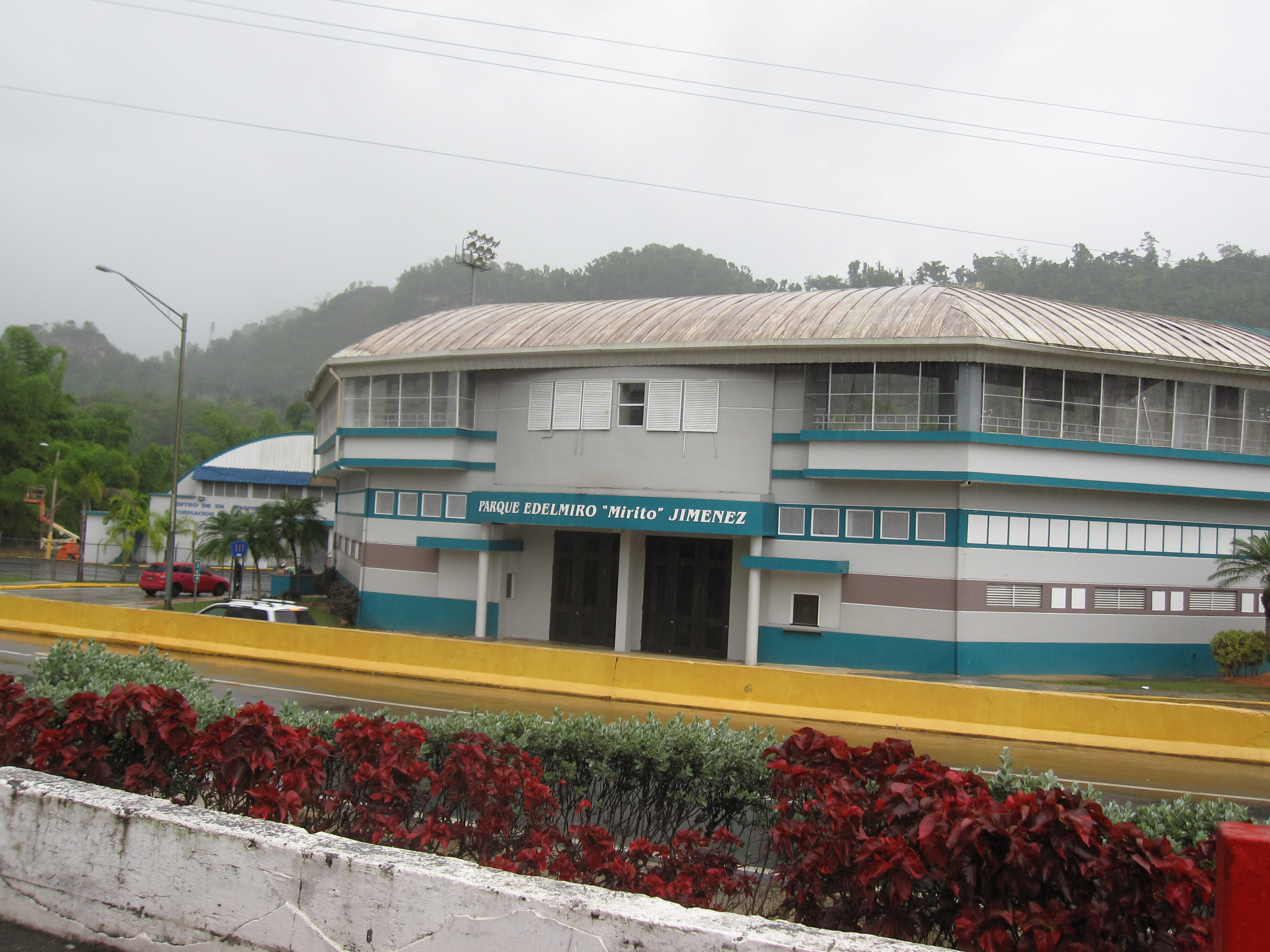
- Ballpark Edelmiro “Mirito” Jiménez in Lares barrio

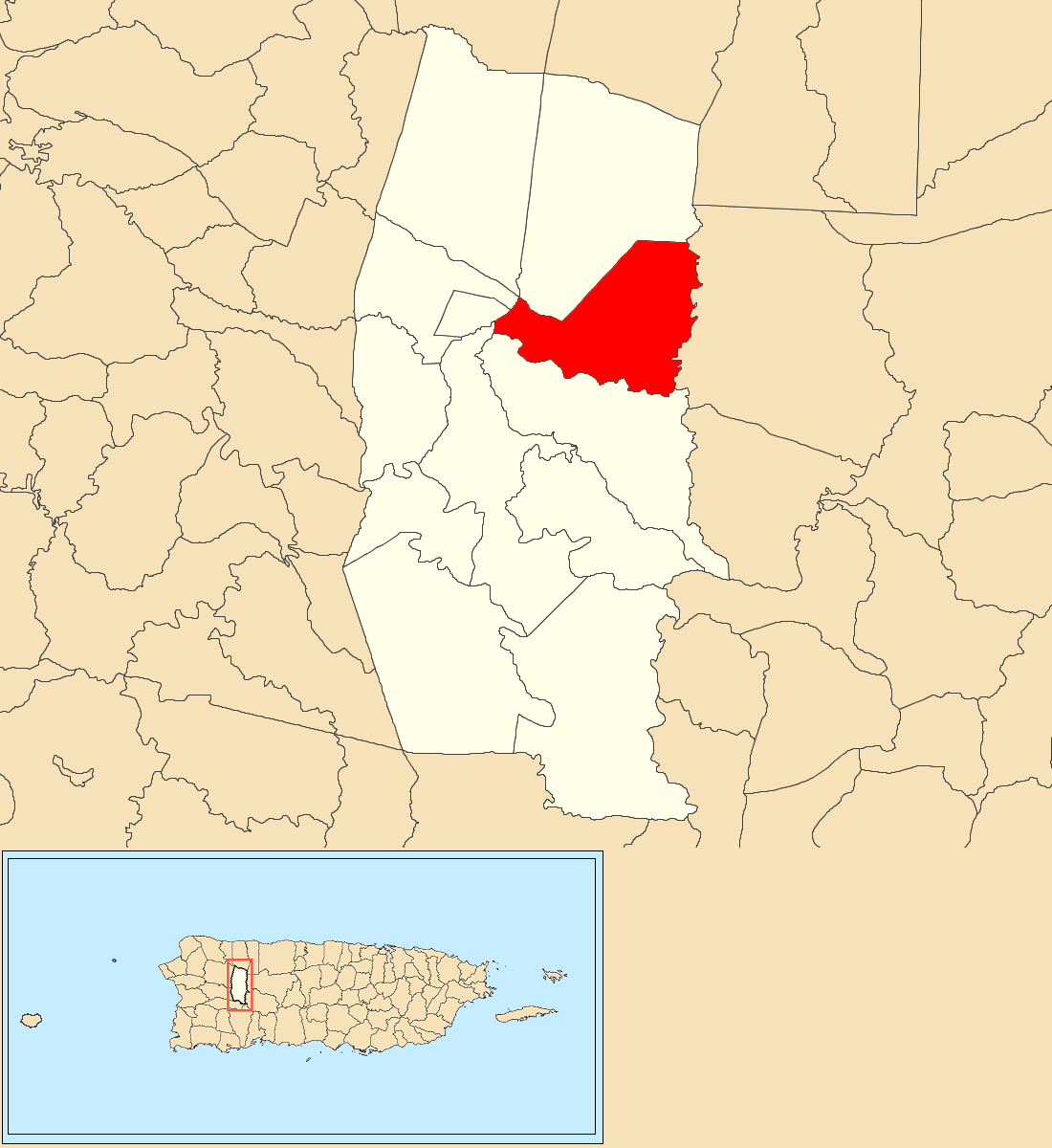
- Location of Lares barrio within the municipality of Lares shown in red

- Location within the Caribbean
- Coordinates: 18°17′39″N 66°50′39″W
- Commonwealth: Puerto Rico
- Municipality: Lares

Area
  - Total: 4.94 sq mi (12.8 km^{2})
  - Land: 4.94 sq mi (12.8 km^{2})
  - Water: 0 sq mi (0 km^{2})
- Elevation: 1,447 ft (441 m)

Population (2010)
  - Total: 3,405
  - Density: 689.3/sq mi (266.1/km^{2})
- Source: 2010 Census
- Time zone: UTC−4 (AST)

Lares is a barrio in the municipality of Lares, Puerto Rico. Its population in 2010 was 3,405.

== History ==
Lares was in Spain's gazetteers until Puerto Rico was ceded by Spain in the aftermath of the Spanish–American War under the terms of the Treaty of Paris of 1898 and became an unincorporated territory of the United States. In 1899, the United States Department of War conducted a census of Puerto Rico finding that the population of Lares barrio was 1,954.

Historical population
Census	Pop.	Note	%±
1900	1,954		—
1910	2,256		15.5%
1920	2,343		3.9%
1930	2,824		20.5%
1940	3,141		11.2%
1950	2,966		−5.6%
1960	2,149		−27.5%
1970	0		−100.0%
1980	3,351		—
1990	3,458		3.2%
2000	3,807		10.1%
2010	3,405		−10.6%
U.S. Decennial Census; 1899 (shown as 1900) 1910-1930; 1930-1950 1980-2000 2010

== Sectors ==
Barrios (which are, in contemporary times, roughly comparable to minor civil divisions) and subbarrios, in turn, are further subdivided into smaller local populated place areas/units called sectores (sectors in English). The types of sectores may vary, from normally sector to urbanización to reparto to barriada to residencial, among others.

The following sectors are in Lares barrio:

Camino Obispo, Cuesta Mayía, El 25, La Sabana Sumidero, Las Casetas Capotillo, Las Tres Marías, Sector Jobos López, Sector Jobos Mario, Sector La Sierra Tatí, Sector Las Minas, Sector Los Muros, Sector Manolo Toledo, Sector Miján Parcelas Miría, Sector Palmarllano, Sector Sierra Miría, Tramo Carretera 111, Tramo Carretera 134, and Urbanización Villa Palmira.

== Features ==
Facilidades Recreativas Edelmiro “Mirito” Jiménez is a recreational facility and mini baseball stadium named after Edelmiro “Mirito” Jiménez, located on PR-111 in Lares barrio.

== See also ==
- List of communities in Puerto Rico
- List of barrios and sectors of Lares, Puerto Rico
