= Lares, Puerto Rico =

Town and municipality in Puerto Rico

Lares Municipio Autónomo de Lares
- Town and Municipality
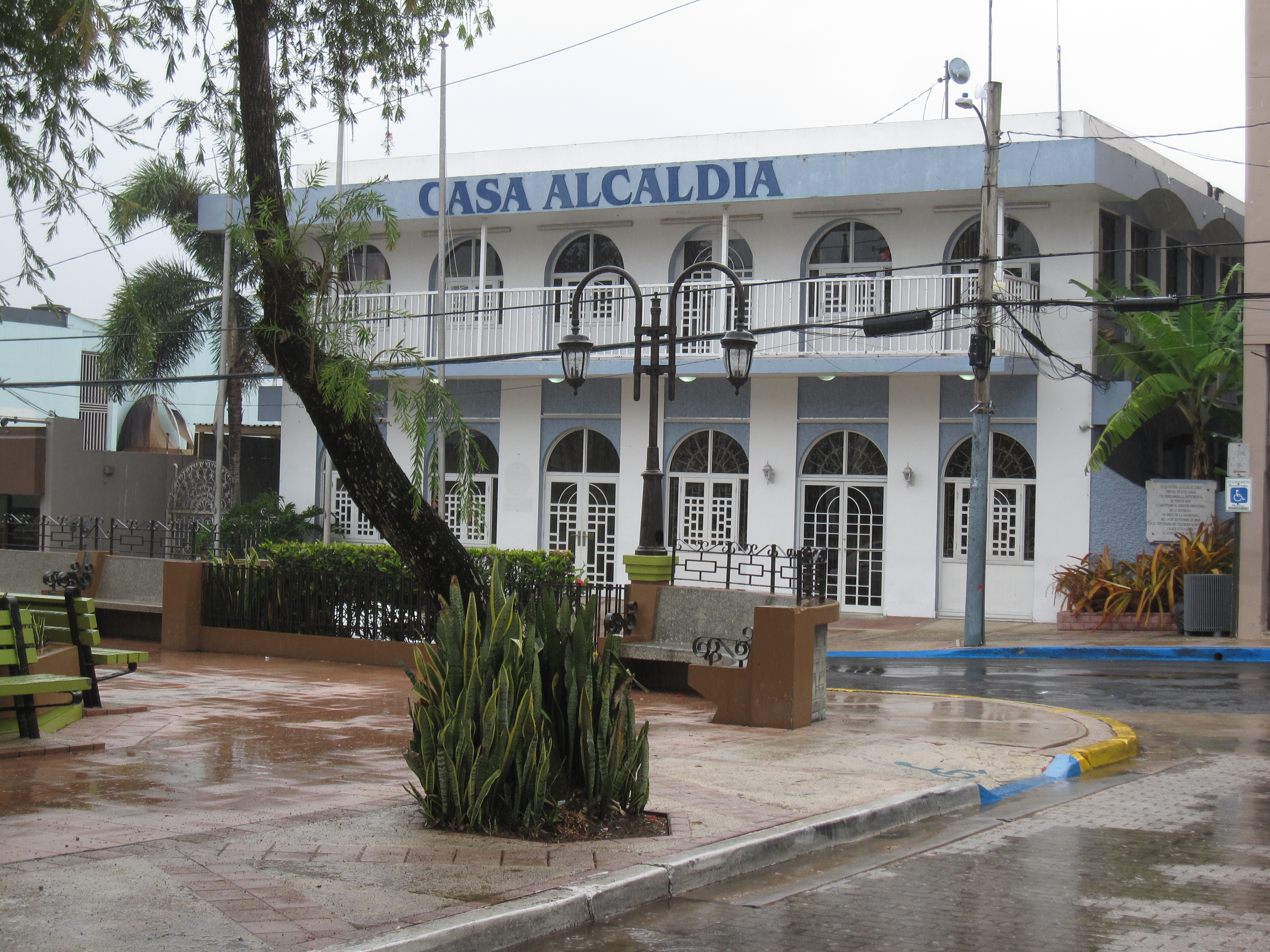
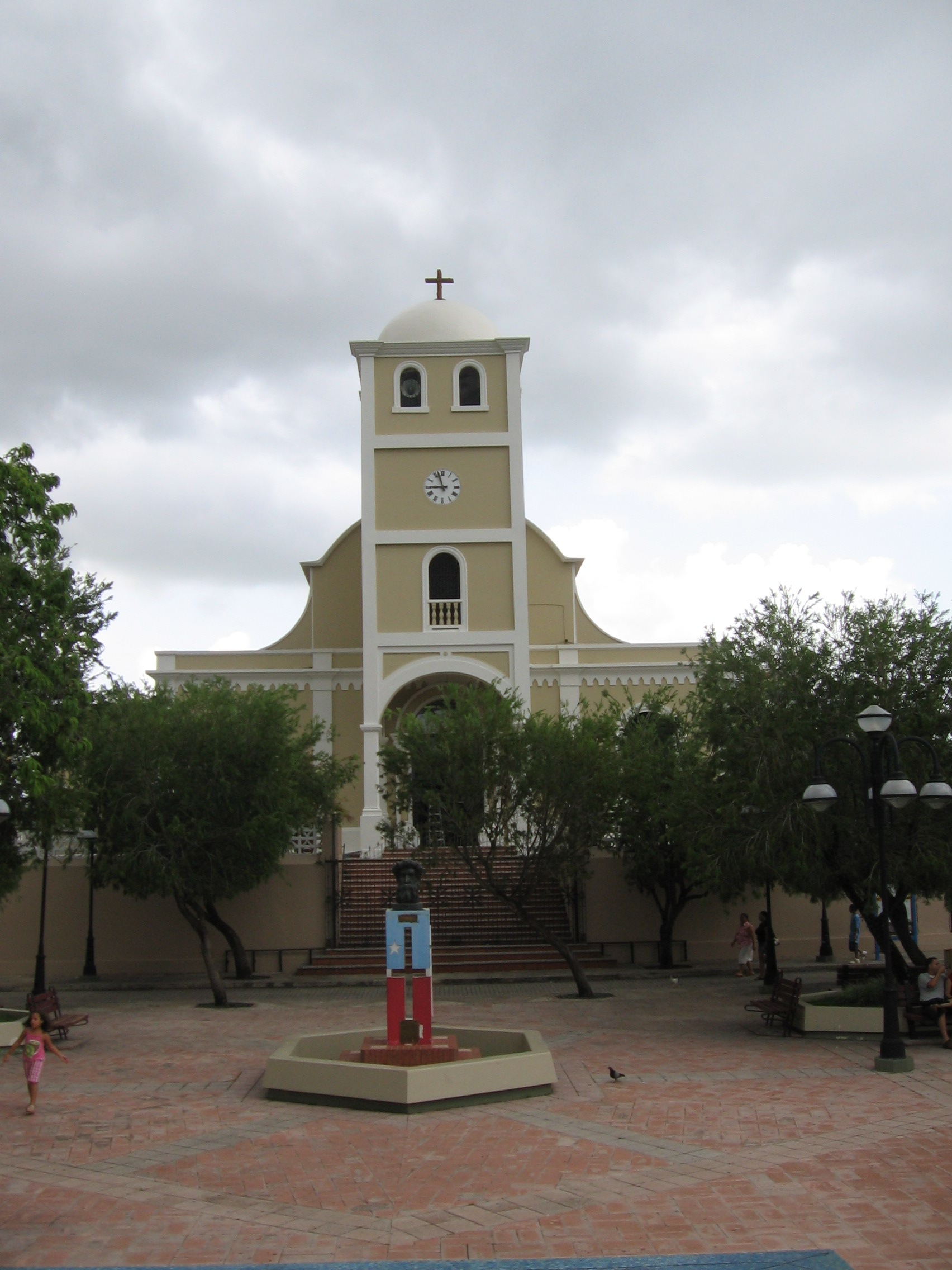
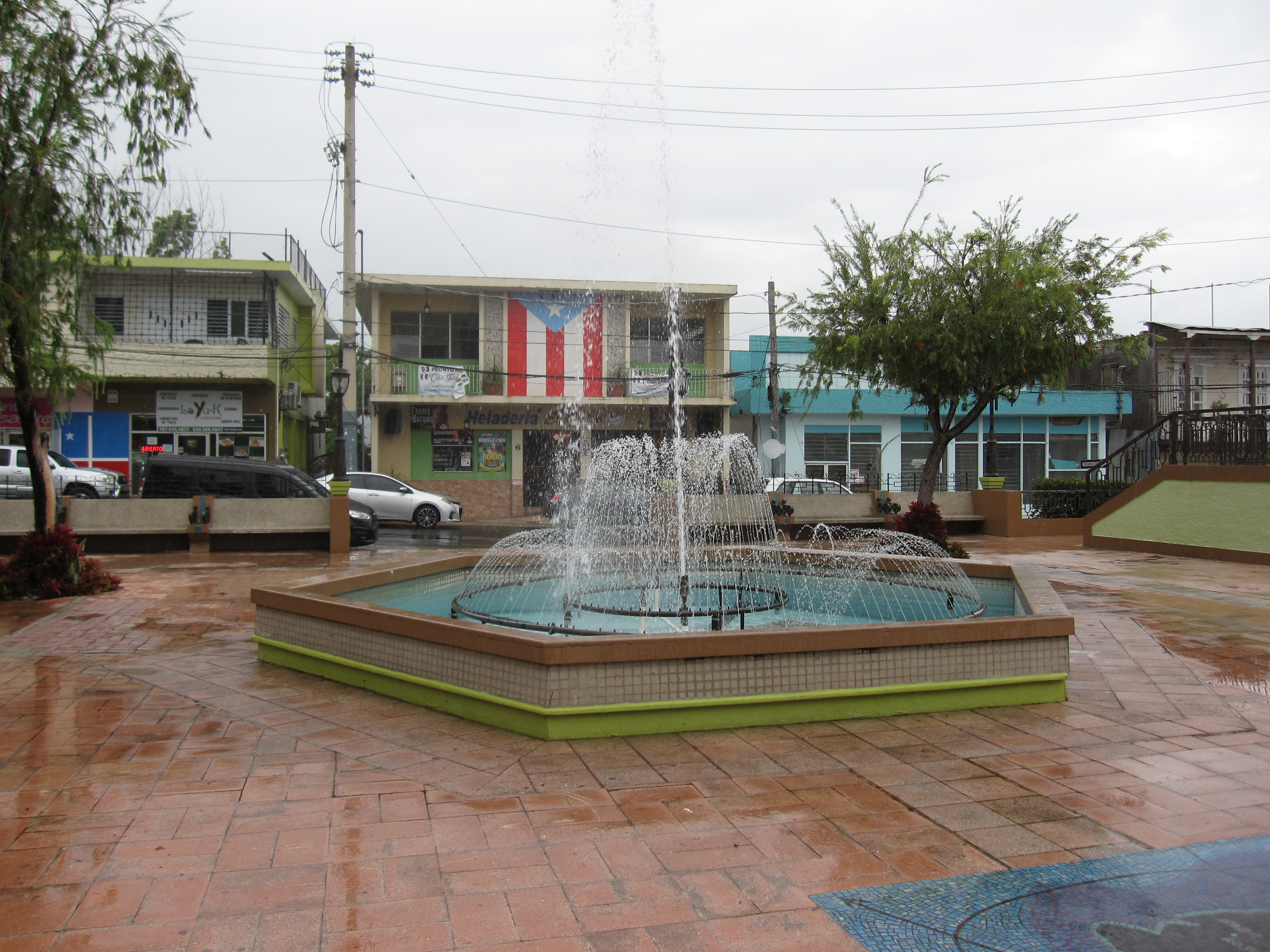
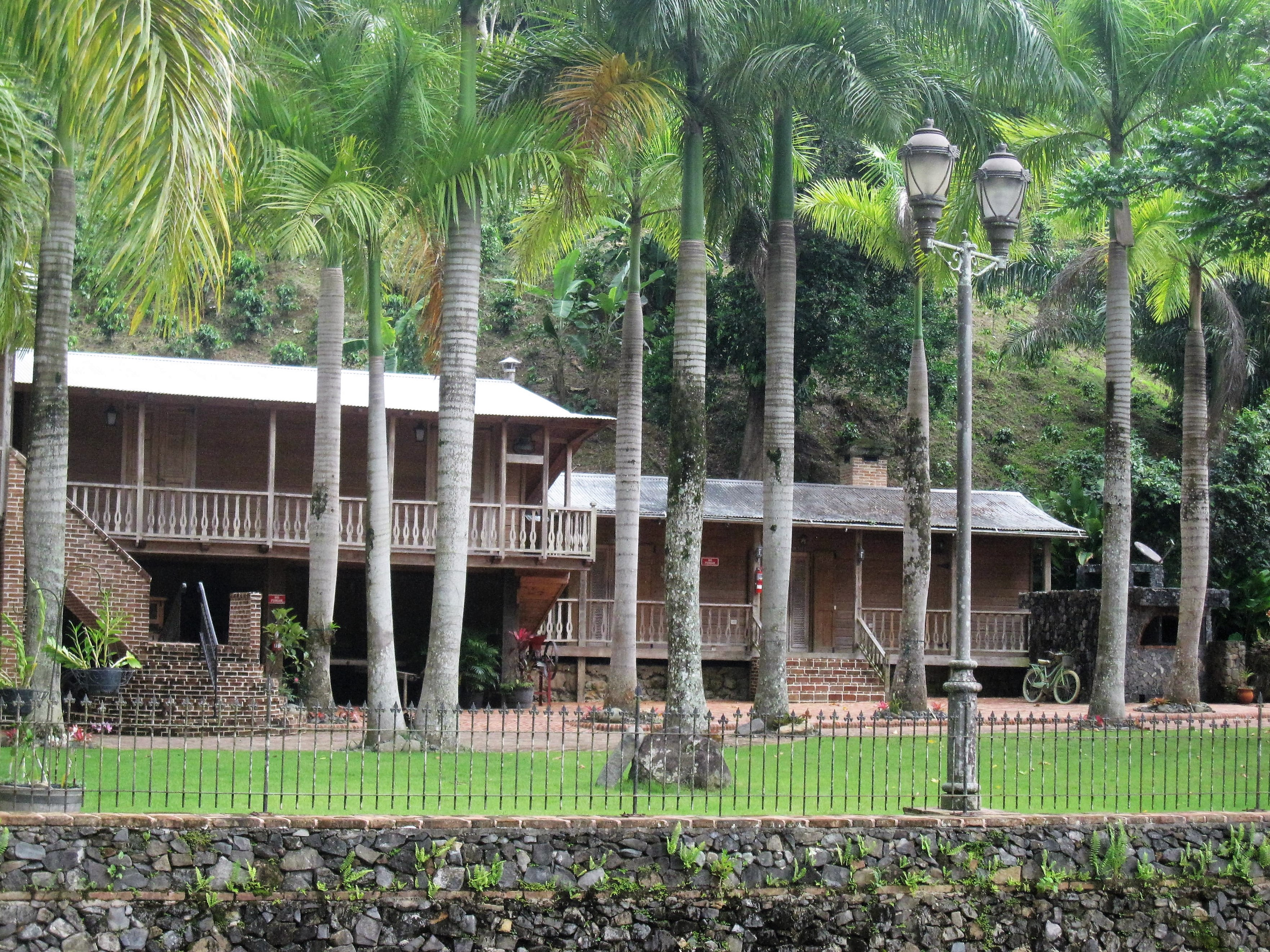
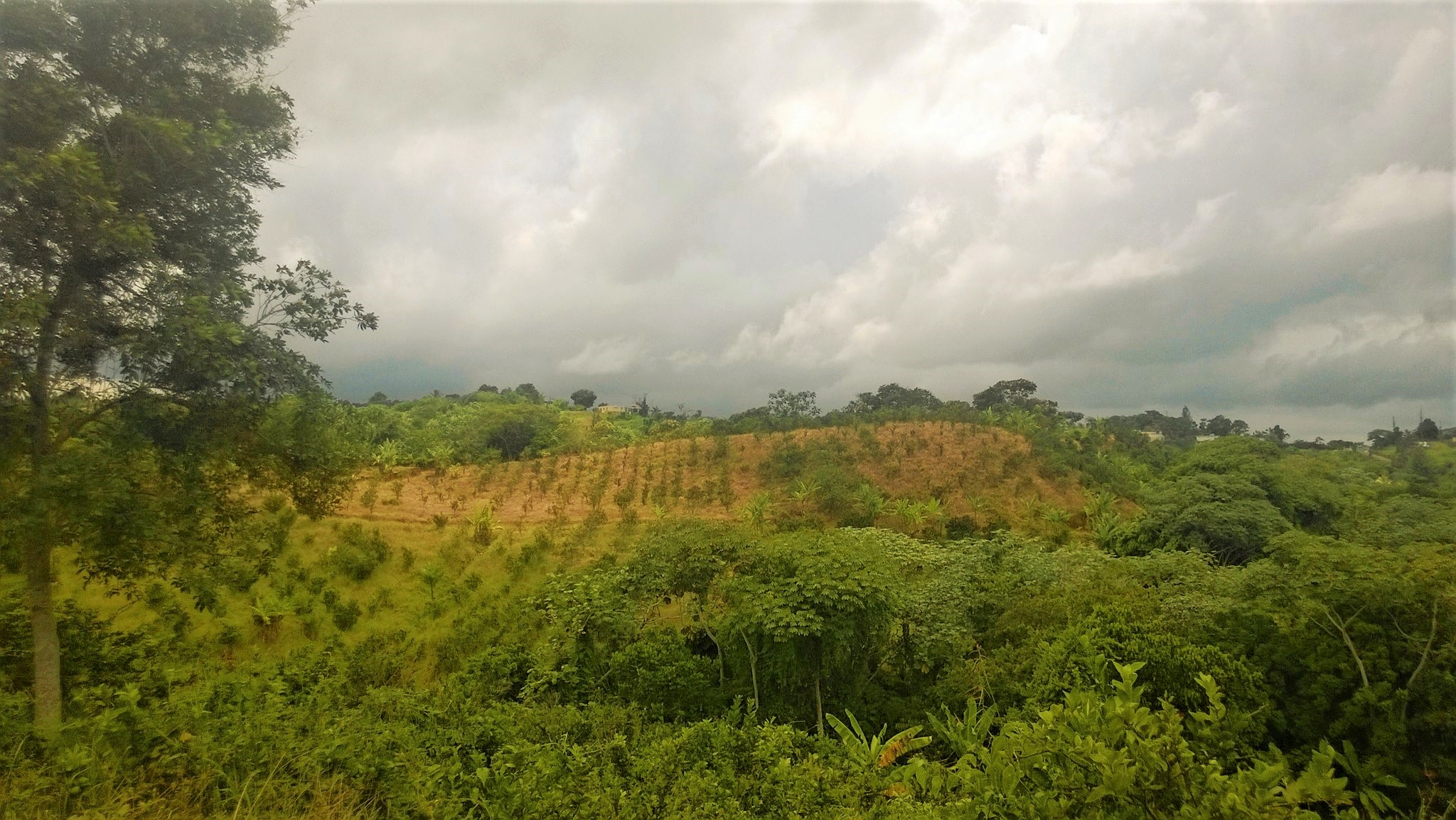
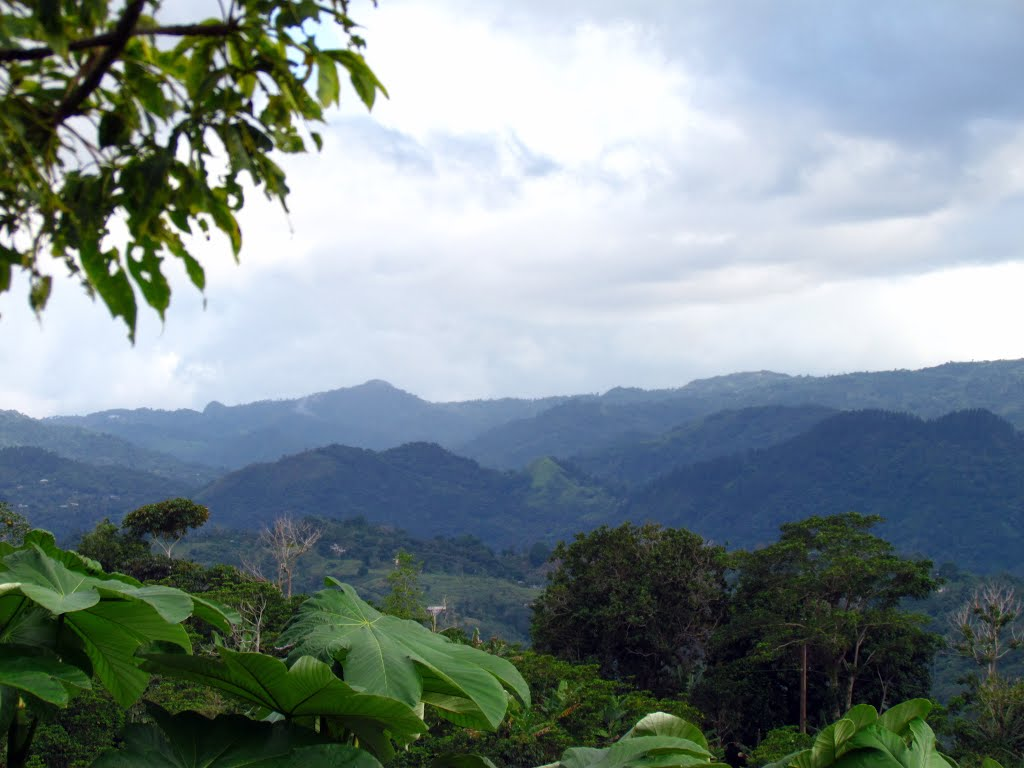
- From top, left to right: Lares city hall in downtown Lares; Parroquia del Glorioso Patriarca San José; Plaza de la Revolución; Hacienda Lealtad; and Panoramic mountainous views from barrios Mirasol and Piletas

- Flag Coat of arms
- Nicknames: Ciudad del Grito (The Town of The Cry), Altar de la Patria (Altar of the Fatherland), La Capital de la Montaña (Capital of the Mountains)
- Anthem: "En las verdes montañas de Lares" (In the green mountains of Lares)
- Map of Puerto Rico highlighting Lares Municipality
- Coordinates: 18°17′42″N 66°52′43″W
- Sovereign state: United States
- Commonwealth: Puerto Rico
- Settled: 1824
- Founded: April 26, 1831
- Founder: Juan Francisco de Soto
- Barrios: 12 barrios: Bartolo; Buenos Aires; Callejones; Espino; Lares; Lares barrio-pueblo; La Torre; Mirasol; Pezuela; Piletas; Pueblo; Río Prieto

Government
  - Mayor: Fabián Arroyo Rodríguez (PPD)
  - Senatorial dist.: 5 – Ponce
  - Representative dist.: 22

Area
  - Total: 61.64 sq mi (159.6 km^{2})
  - Land: 61.45 sq mi (159.2 km^{2})
  - Water: .09 sq mi (0.23 km^{2})

Population (2020)
  - Total: 28,105
  - Estimate (2025): 27,744 ▼
  - Rank: 45th in Puerto Rico
  - Density: 457.4/sq mi (176.6/km^{2})
- Demonym: Lareños
- Time zone: UTC−4 (AST)
- ZIP Codes: 00669, 00631
- Area code: 787/939

Lares (Spanish pronunciation: [ˈlaɾes], locally [ˈlaɾeʔ]) is a mountain town and municipality of Puerto Rico's central-western area. Lares is located north of Maricao and Yauco; south of Camuy, east of San Sebastián and Las Marias; and west of Hatillo, Utuado and Adjuntas. Lares is spread over 10 barrios and Lares Pueblo (Downtown Lares). It is part of the Aguadilla-Isabela-San Sebastián Metropolitan Statistical Area.

A city adorned with Spanish-era colonial-style churches and small downtown stores, Lares is located on a mountainous, breezy area that is about 1.5 hours from the capital San Juan by car.

In 1868, Lares was the site of the Grito de Lares (literally, The Cry of Lares, or Lares Revolt), an uprising brought on by pro-independence rebels and members of the Revolutionary Committee of Puerto Rico striving for Puerto Rican independence from Spain. Even though it was short-lived, it remains an iconic historical event in the history of the island. The flag of the revolt, known as the Bandera del Grito de Lares (Grito de Lares flag), is the official flag of Lares.

== History ==
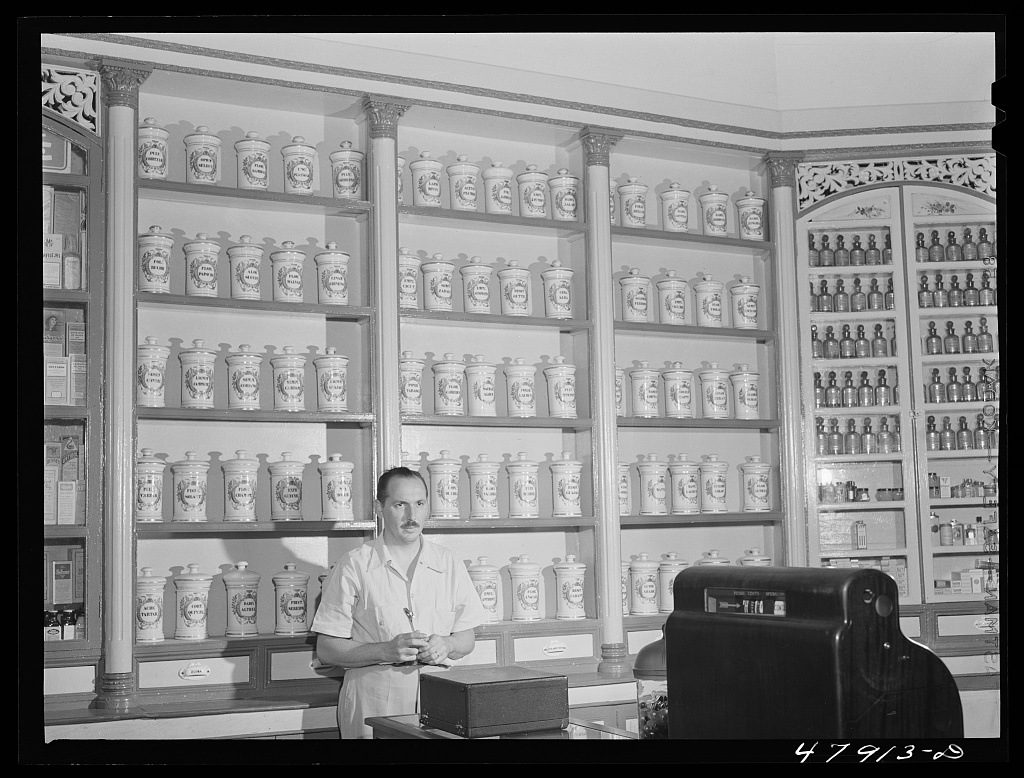
An apothecary store in Lares in 1942

Lares was founded on April 26, 1827, by Francisco de Sotomayor and Pedro Vélez Borrero, who named the town after Amador de Lariz, a Spanish nobleman and one of its settlers.

Lares was the location of the Grito de Lares (Cry of Lares) revolt against Spanish rule in Puerto Rico on September 23, 1868. The revolt is recognized as the most important symbol of the Puerto Rican struggle for independence. Historian Fernando Picó described it thus:

This revolution was the biggest anti-Spanish manifestation in the history of the island and articulated the economic frustrations of nearly ruined landowners, the political project of the creoles, the rejection of coerced labor by the jornaleros (day laborers), and the emancipation hopes of the enslaved population. — Fernando Picó, The Absent State

Lares adopted the flag of the revolt as its official flag. The flag was proclaimed the national flag of a sovereign "Republic of Puerto Rico" by the revolting revolutionaries in 1868, making it the first flag of Puerto Rico. In 1895, the exiled revolutionaries replaced it with the current flag of Puerto Rico as the new revolutionary flag to represent an independent Puerto Rico. As the flag of the revolt, the flag of Lares is used by the independence movement in Puerto Rico to show support for the independence of the island from the United States.

Puerto Rico was ceded by Spain in the aftermath of the Spanish–American War under the terms of the Treaty of Paris of 1898 and became a territory of the United States. In 1899, the United States Department of War conducted a census of Puerto Rico finding that the population of Lares was 20,883.

Hurricane Maria on September 20, 2017, triggered numerous landslides in Lares. In many areas of Lares there were more than 25 landslides per square mile due to the significant amount of rainfall. Puerto Rico se levanta (Puerto Rico will stand up) became the slogan used across the island to communicate the island would rise again.

When the hurricane hit, many areas in the Municipal Cemetery of Lares were damaged by landslides. Total affected were about 5,000 burial plots, with the burial places shifting and some plots opened. In response, the municipality closed the cemetery to the public. In early 2019, El Nuevo Día newspaper in Puerto Rico began listing the names of the cadavers that would be exhumed and moved to other cemeteries, a long and delicate process. On March 4, an update was given by Lares officials on how the issue was being handled. On May 10, 2019, it was announced that a decision had been made to build a temporary wooden structure separating the affected area so that family members could visit the plots that were unaffected by the hurricane-triggered landslides. The Bravo Family Foundation sent relief to Lares, in the immediate aftermath.

The December 2019 and January 2020 Puerto Rico earthquakes caused 28 families in Lares to lose their homes.

== Geography ==
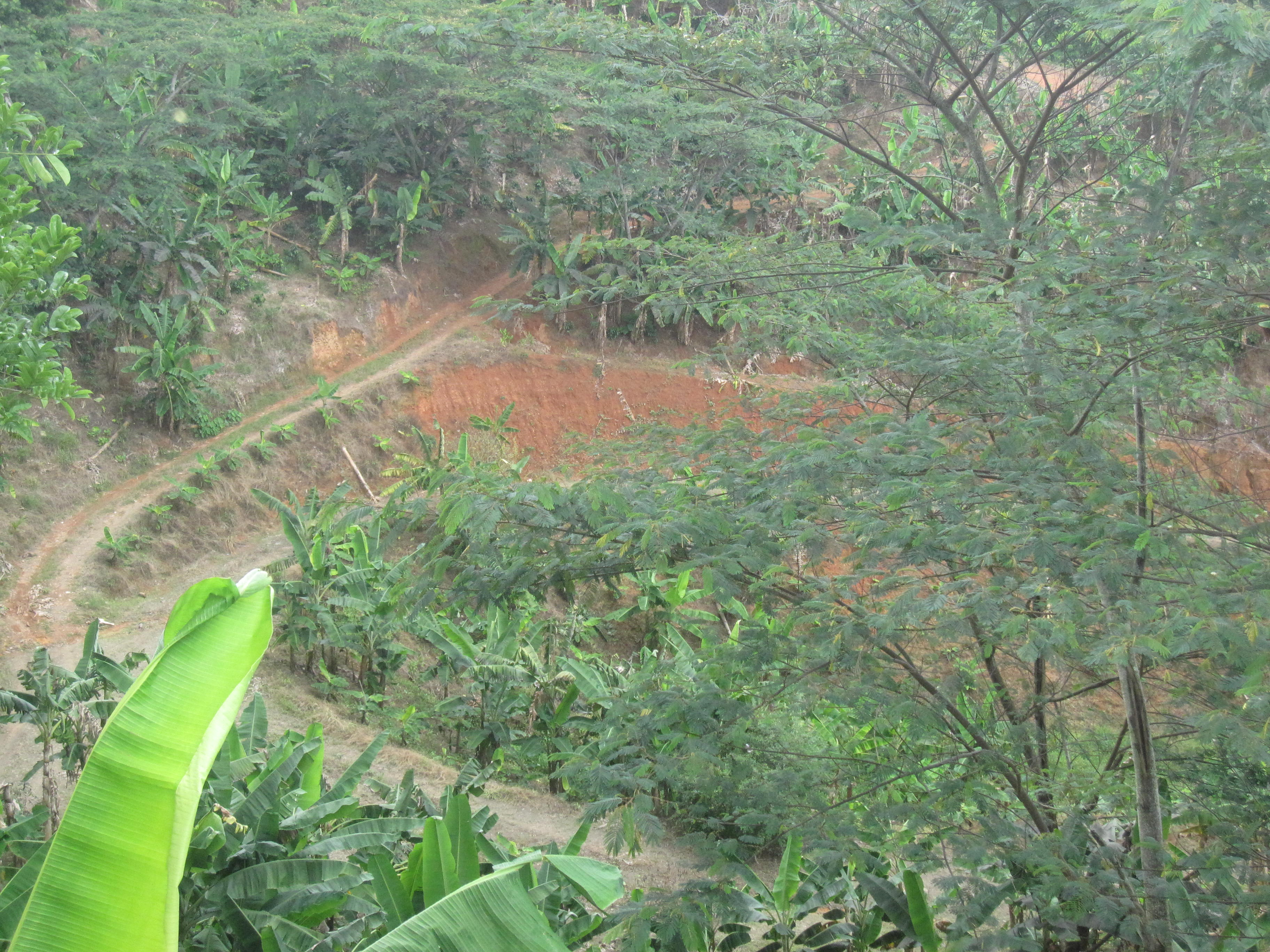
Cultivating in La Torre barrio in Lares in 2019

Lares is a mountainous municipality located in the central western part of the island of Puerto Rico. According to the 2010 U.S. Census Bureau, the municipality has a total area of 61.64 square miles (159.6 km^{2}), of which 61.45 square miles (159.2 km^{2}) is land and .09 square miles (0.23 km^{2}) is water.

=== Caves ===
There are 10 caves in Lares. Cueva Machos and Cueva Pajita are located in Callejones barrio.

=== Barrios ===
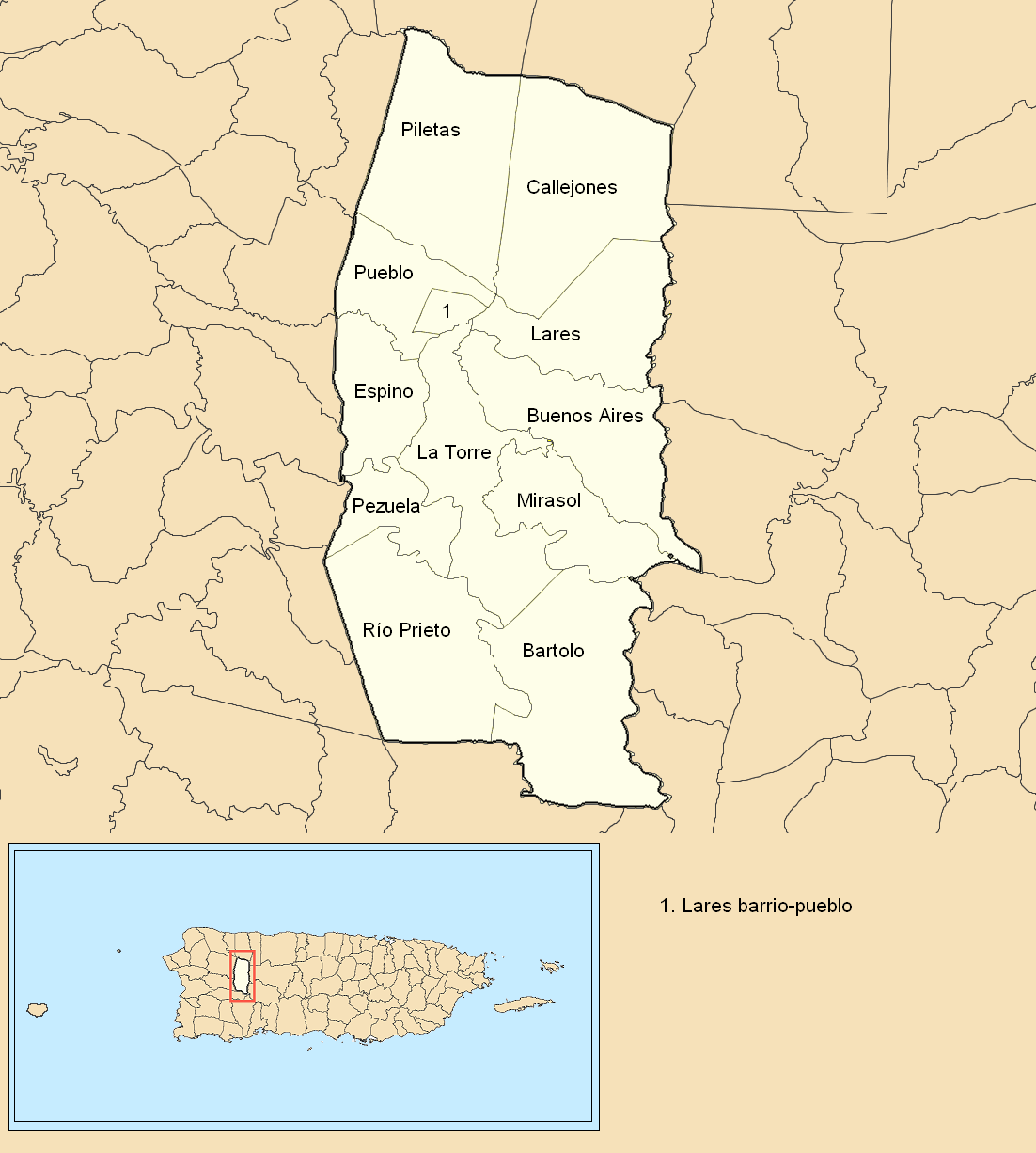
Subdivisions of Lares.

Like all municipalities of Puerto Rico, Lares is divided into barrios. The municipal buildings, central square and large Catholic church are located near the center of the municipality, in a barrio referred to as "el pueblo".

1. Bartolo
2. Buenos Aires
3. Callejones
4. Espino
5. Lares
6. Lares barrio-pueblo
7. La Torre
8. Mirasol
9. Pezuela
10. Piletas
11. Pueblo
12. Río Prieto

=== Sectors ===
Barrios (which are, in contemporary times, roughly comparable to minor civil divisions) are further subdivided into smaller areas called sectores ( sectors in English). The types of sectores may vary, from normally sector to urbanización to reparto to barriada to residencial, among others.

=== Special Communities ===
Comunidades Especiales de Puerto Rico (Special Communities of Puerto Rico) are marginalized communities whose citizens are experiencing a certain amount of social exclusion. A map shows these communities occur in nearly every municipality of the commonwealth. Of the 742 places that were on the list in 2014, the following barrios, communities, sectors, or neighborhoods were in Lares: Castañer, Cerro Avispa, Comunidad Anón, Comunidad Arizona, Comunidad El Bajadero, Comunidad Peligro, Comunidad San Felipe, and Seburuquillo.

== Tourism ==
=== Landmarks and places of interest ===
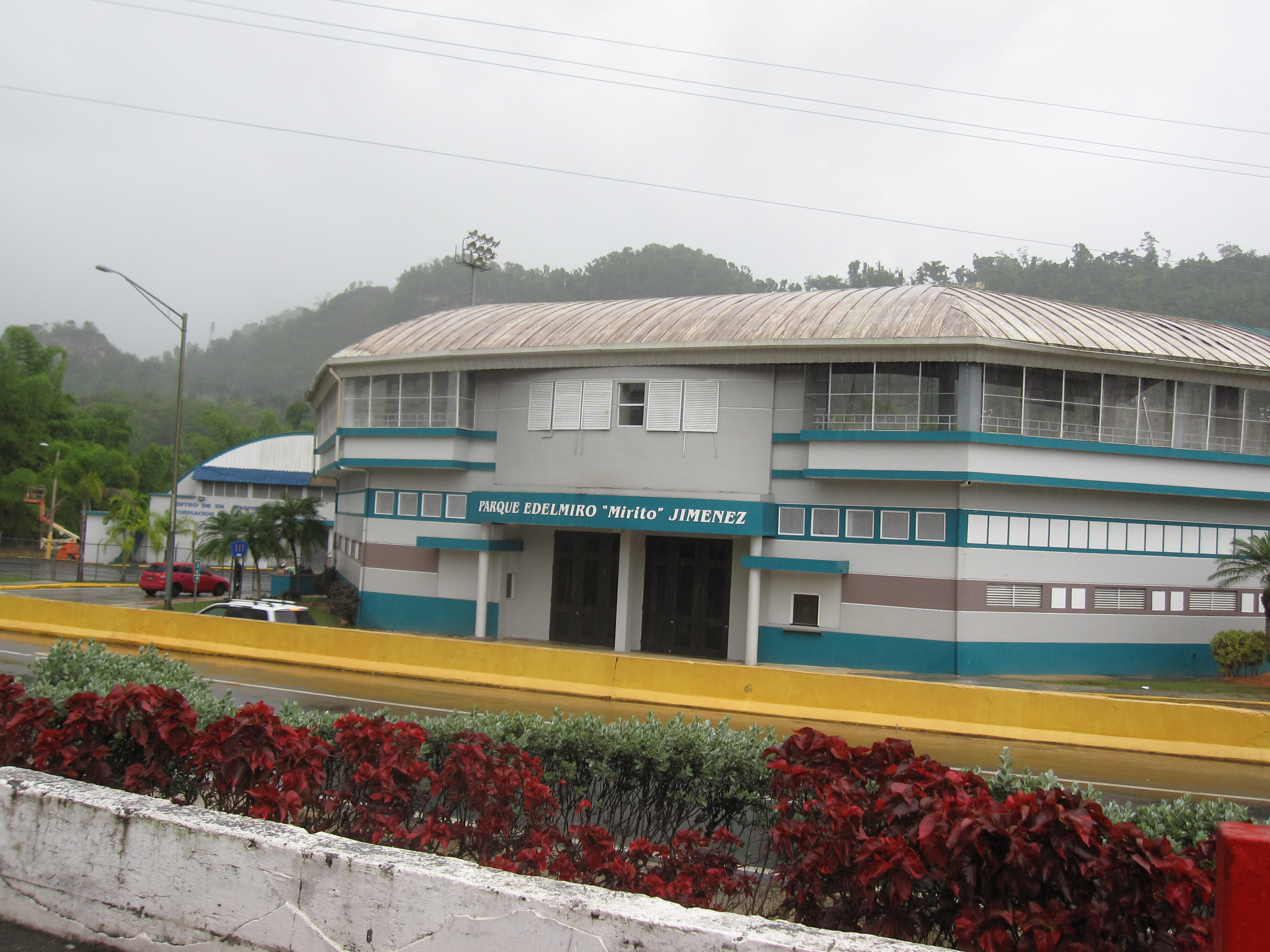
The Edelmiro "Mirito" Jiménez baseball park is in Barrio Lares in Lares

- Callejones Site — NRHP listed
- Downtown Castañer and its former city hall
- Hacienda Collazo
- Hacienda El Porvenir
- Hacienda Lealtad
- Hacienda Los Torres — NRHP listed
- Heladería de Lares — ice cream parlor
- Mirador Mariana Bracetti
- Parque El Jíbaro

== Festivals and events ==
Lares celebrates its patron saint festival in December. The Fiestas Patronales de San Jose is a religious and cultural celebration that generally features parades, games, artisans, amusement rides, regional food, and live entertainment. The festival has featured live performances by well-known artists such as Sie7e, and Ednita Nazario.

Other festivals and events celebrated in Lares include:

- Banana Festival – June
- Lares Festival – September
- Rábano Estate Festival – October
- Almojábana Festival – March

== Sports ==
Lares has a professional volleyball team called Patriotas de Lares (Lares Patriots) that has international players. The Patriotas won 3 championships, in 1981, 1983 and 2002. In 1981 and 1983 they beat Corozal in the finals and in 2002 they beat Naranjito.

== Economy ==
Heladería de Lares (Lares Ice Cream Shop), July 2007

Lares' economy is primarily agricultural. Harvested products include bananas, coffee, oranges, and tomatoes.

Tourism also plays a significant role in the municipality's economy. The Heladeria de Lares (Lares Ice Cream Shop) is well known around Puerto Rico for its unorthodox selection of ice cream including; rice and beans-flavored ice cream.

There was a large population exodus, out of Lares, after September 20, 2017, when Hurricane Maria struck the island.

In 2016, Rural Opportunities Puerto Rico Inc. (ROPRI) in conjunction with the United States Department of Agriculture (USDA) completed the building of 24 (one-bedroom, two-bedroom and three-bedroom) units in Lares, specifically for farmers (in Spanish: agricultores), and their families, to live and work. It is called Alturas de Castañer (Castañer Heights) and there the families work to grow coffee, bananas and other crops which are sold to markets, and restaurants nearby.

== Demographics ==
Historical population
Census	Pop.	Note	%±
1900	20,883		—
1910	22,650		8.5%
1920	25,197		11.2%
1930	27,351		8.5%
1940	29,914		9.4%
1950	29,951		0.1%
1960	26,922		−10.1%
1970	25,263		−6.2%
1980	26,743		5.9%
1990	29,015		8.5%
2000	34,415		18.6%
2010	30,753		−10.6%
2020	28,105		−8.6%
2025 (est.)	27,744	▼	−1.3%
U.S. Decennial Census; 1899 (shown as 1900) 1910-1930; 1930-1950 1960-2000 2010 2020

Like most of Puerto Rico, Lares population originated with the Taino Indians and then many immigrants from Spain settled the central highland, most prominently the Andalusian, Canarian and Extremaduran Spanish migration who formed the bulk of the Jibaro or white peasant stock of the island. The Andalusian, Canarian and Extremaduran Spaniards also influenced much of the Puerto Rican culture which explains the use of Spanish and the Spanish architecture that can be found in the city.

== Government ==
The mayor of Lares for fifteen years was Roberto Pagán Centeno, who resigned in late 2019. His successor, José Rodríguez Ruiz, began serving his term as mayor of Lares on January 20, 2020. Fabian Arroyo was elected to a four-year term as part of the 2020 general elections.

The city belongs to the Puerto Rico Senatorial district V, which is represented by two Senators. In 2024, Marially González Huertas and Jamie Barlucea, from the Popular Democratic Party and New Progressive Party, respectively, were elected as District Senators.

== Education ==
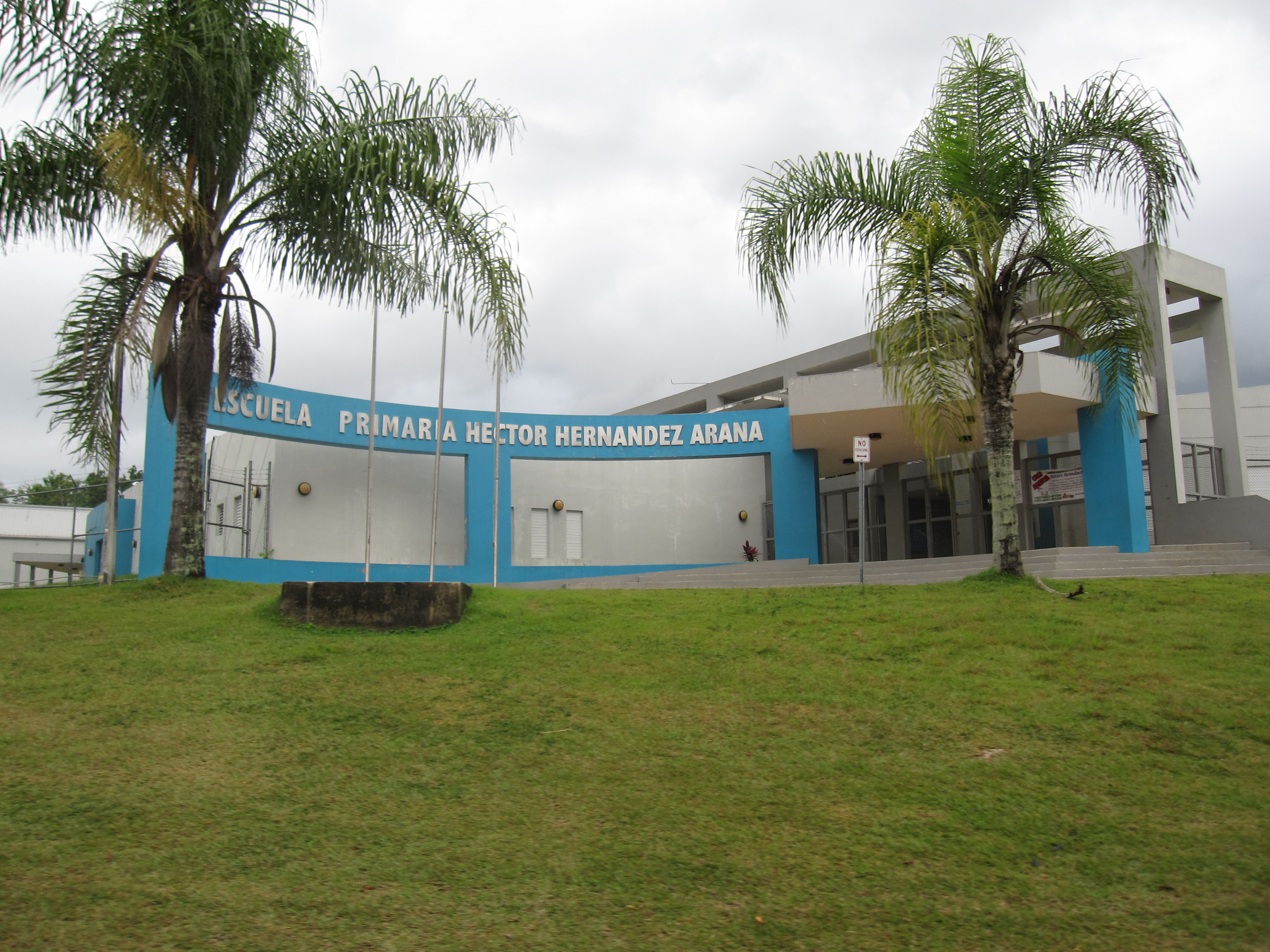
Héctor Hernández Arana school, Lares, Puerto Rico

The Héctor Hernández Arana Primary school is located in Lares.

== Symbols ==
The municipio has an official flag and coat of arms.

=== Flag ===
The origins of the flag of Lares can be traced back to the failed Grito de Lares (Cry of Lares) revolt of 1868 against Spanish rule. The flag is modeled after the flag of the First Dominican Republic and the flag of Cuba, reflecting the revolutionaries idea to unite the Spanish-speaking Greater Antilles of Puerto Rico, Cuba, and the Dominican Republic in Hispaniola into an Antillean Confederation. The flag was first knitted by Mariana Bracetti at the behest of Ramón Emeterio Betances, leader of the Revolutionary Committee of Puerto Rico.

Th flag consists of a white cross in the center that extends to its four sides, with four equal rectangles, two located on top and two below the arms of the cross. The superior (top) ones are blue and the inferior (bottom) ones red. A five-pointed white star is located in the center of the upper left rectangle.

=== Coat of arms ===
A silver cross is centered on and extends across the shield from side to side and top to bottom; it has blue top quadrants and red bottom quadrants; it has a five pointed silver star in the upper left quadrant. A chain surrounds the shield. The seal is same coat of arms with a scroll and a ribbon in a semicircle with the words Lares Ciudad del Grito (Lares City of the Cry).

== Transportation ==
Puerto Rico State Route 111 provides access to Lares.

Lares has 15 bridges.

== Notable Lareños ==
- Singer, composer and Virtuoso Guitarist Jose Feliciano who wrote and sang the Feliz Navidad Song, was born in Lares on September 8, 1945
- Lolita Lebrón was a Puerto Rican nationalist who was convicted of attempted murder and other crimes in 1954 and freed from prison in 1979 after being granted clemency by President Jimmy Carter.
- Denise Quiñones – Miss Universe 2001
- Luis Hernández Aquino
- Odilio González (born March 5, 1937), known by his stage name El Jibarito de Lares, is a Puerto Rican singer, guitarist and music composer who has been singing and composing for more than 65 years.
- Samuel Molina (1935–2018), well-known actor, comedian and writer.

== Gallery ==
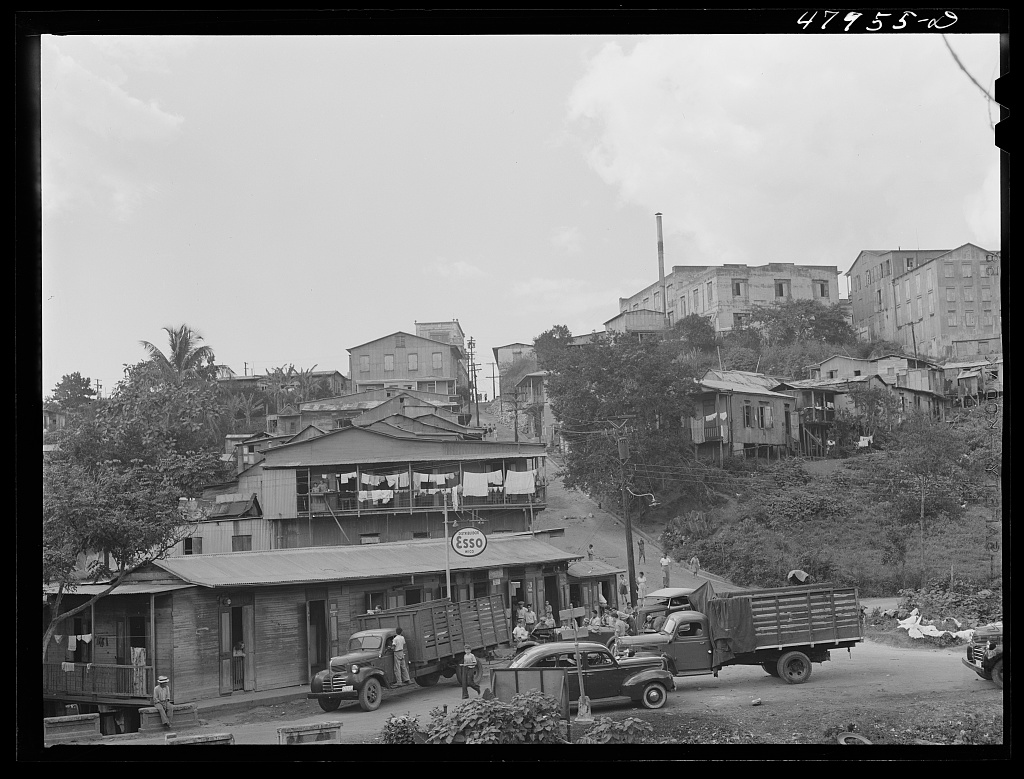
"Lares, Puerto Rico. A street in the town" (Photograph by Jack Delano, 1941)

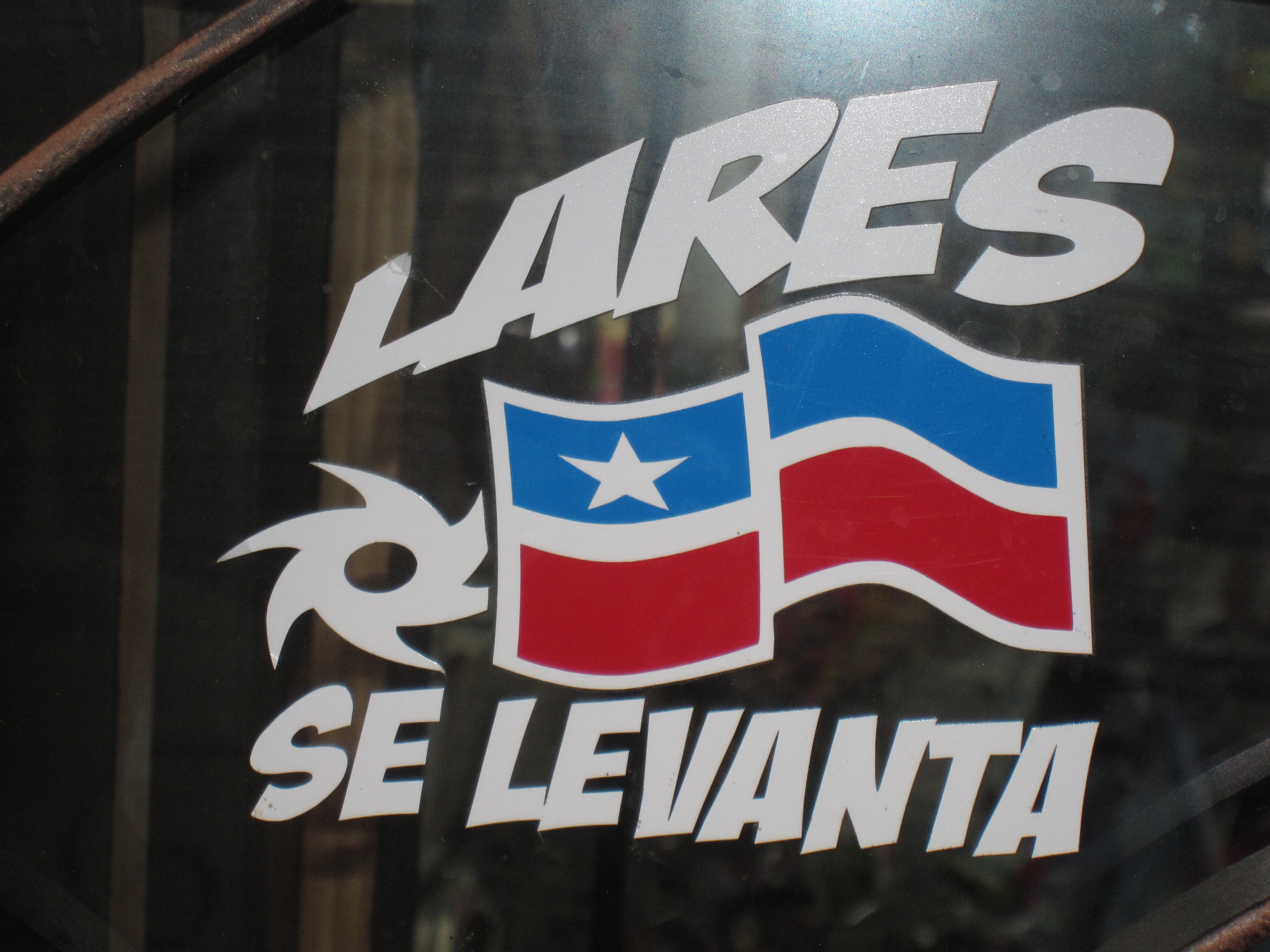
Lares se levanta sign seen in Lares in June 2019

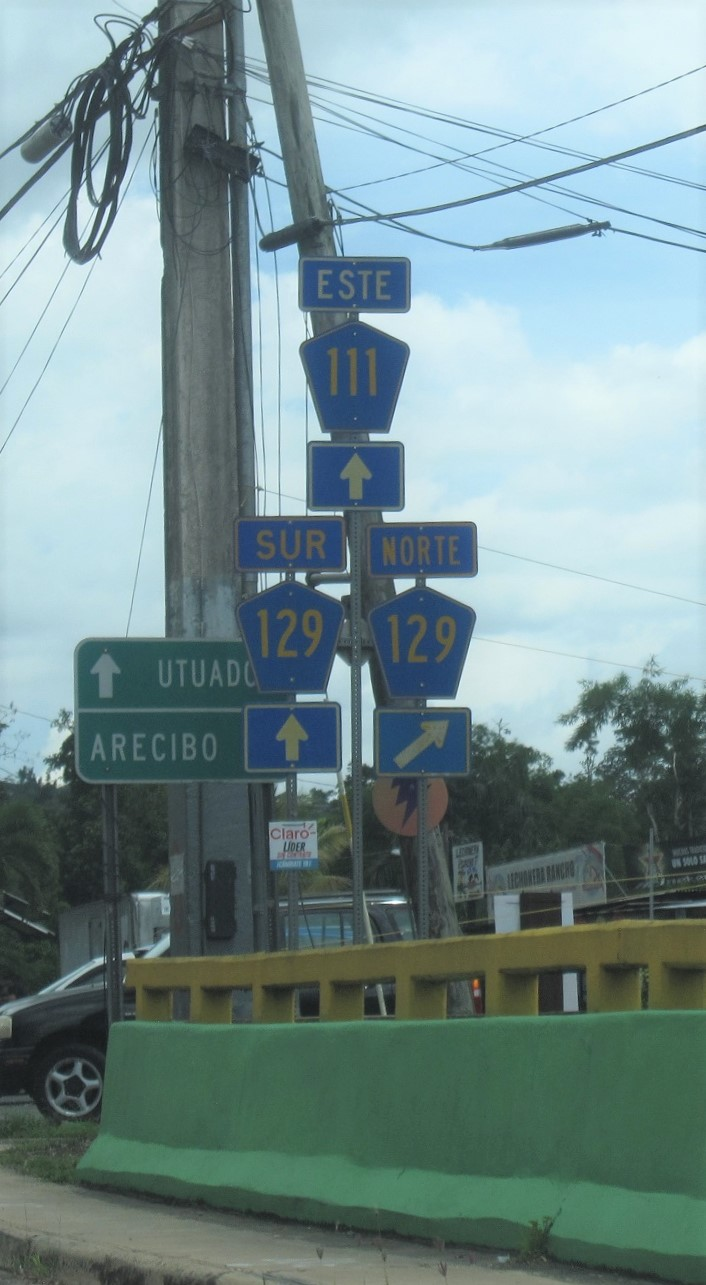
Puerto Rico Highway 111 East near 129 junction in Lares

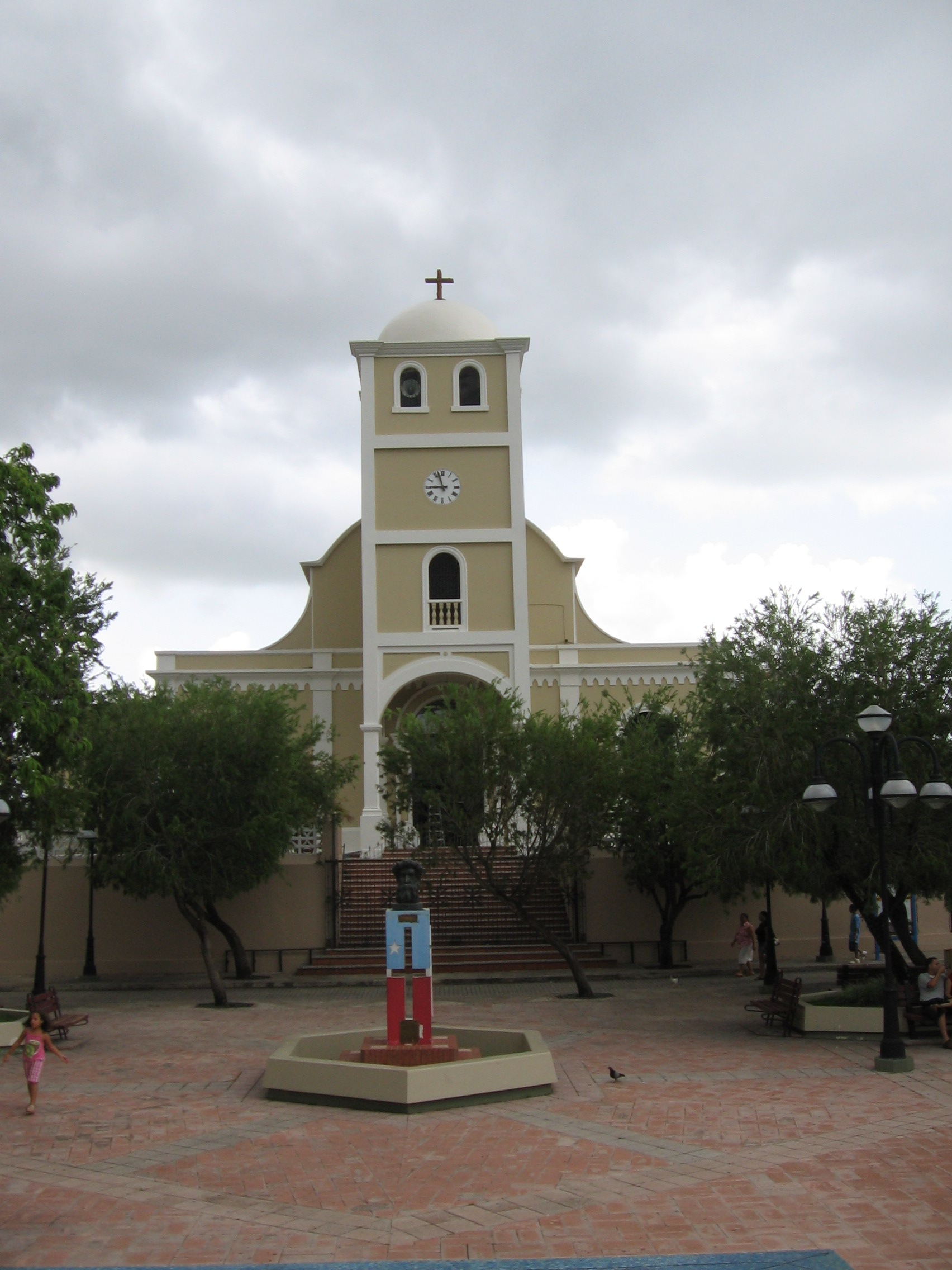
Catedral de Lares (Lares Cathedral) in July 2007

== See also ==
- List of Puerto Ricans
- History of Puerto Rico
- Did you know-Puerto Rico?
