= Hacienda Los Torres =

Historic structure in Lares, Puerto Rico

- U.S. National Register of Historic Places
- Puerto Rico Historic Sites and Zones
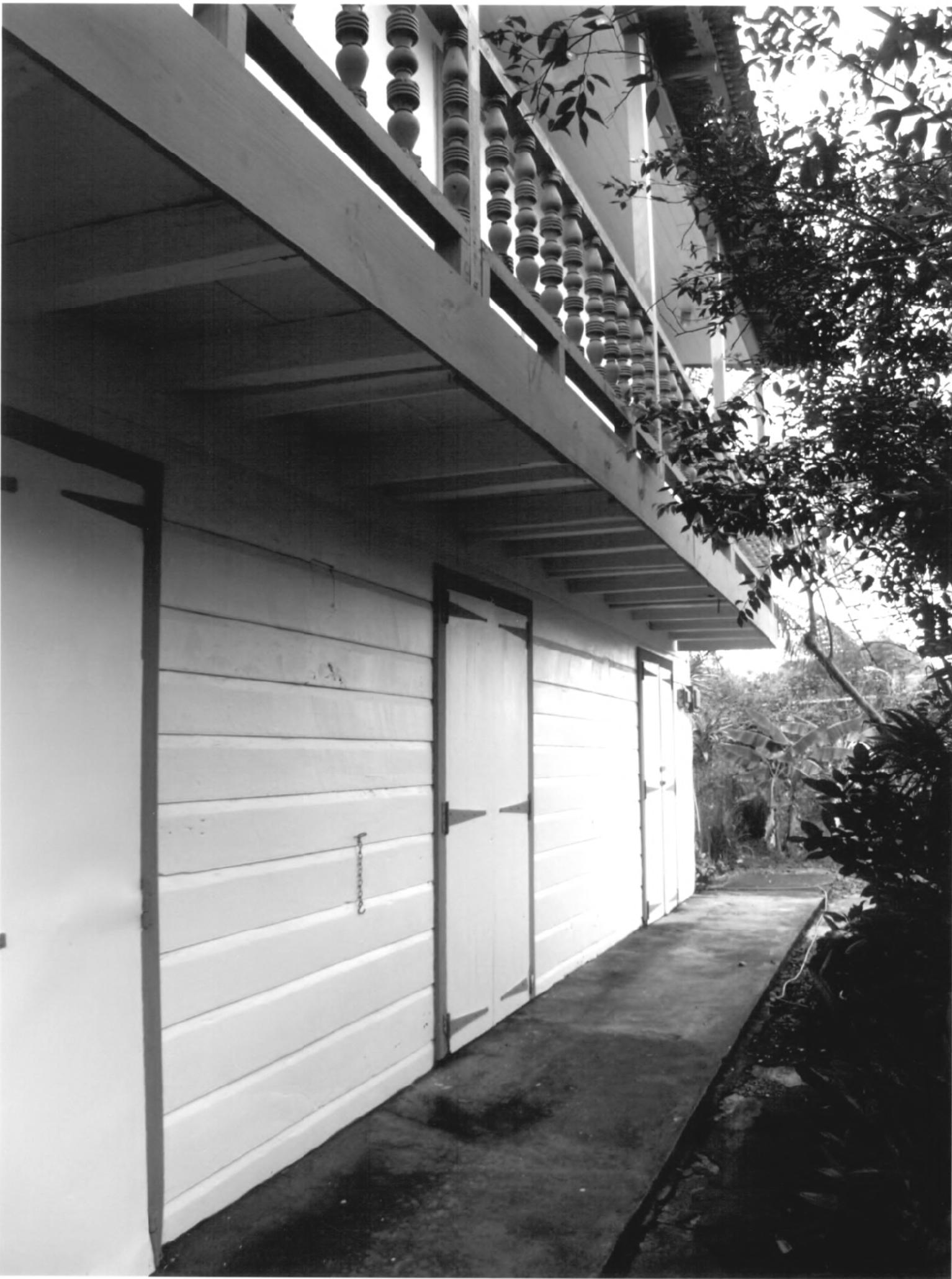

- Location within Puerto Rico
- Location: Jct. PR 111 and PR 129, Lares, Puerto Rico
- Coordinates: 18°17′48″N 66°52′16″W
- Area: less than one acre
- Built: 1846
- Architect: Jose Maria Torres y Medina
- Architectural style: Mission/spanish Revival
- NRHP reference No.: 06000896
- RNSZH No.: 2007-33-01-JP-SH

Significant dates
- Added to NRHP: September 28, 2006
- Designated RNSZH: February 21, 2007

The Hacienda Los Torres also known as Casona Los Torres in Lares, Puerto Rico, dates from 1846. It was listed on the National Register of Historic Places in 2006, and on the Puerto Rico Register of Historic Sites and Zones in 2007. Designed by Jose Maria Torres y Medina, it is located at the junction of Puerto Rico Highway 111 and Puerto Rico Highway 129.

It was named one of America's 11 Most Endangered Places in 2019.

It is significant for its "type, materials, craftsmanship, and particular assembly planning". Originally part of a coffee plantation was built with trees grown onsite, many of which are now exotic and hard. Part of the exterior was built with Puerto Rican royal palm (Roystonea borinquena), rarely used in construction.
