= Mirasol, Lares, Puerto Rico =

Barrio of Puerto Rico

Mirasol
- Barrio
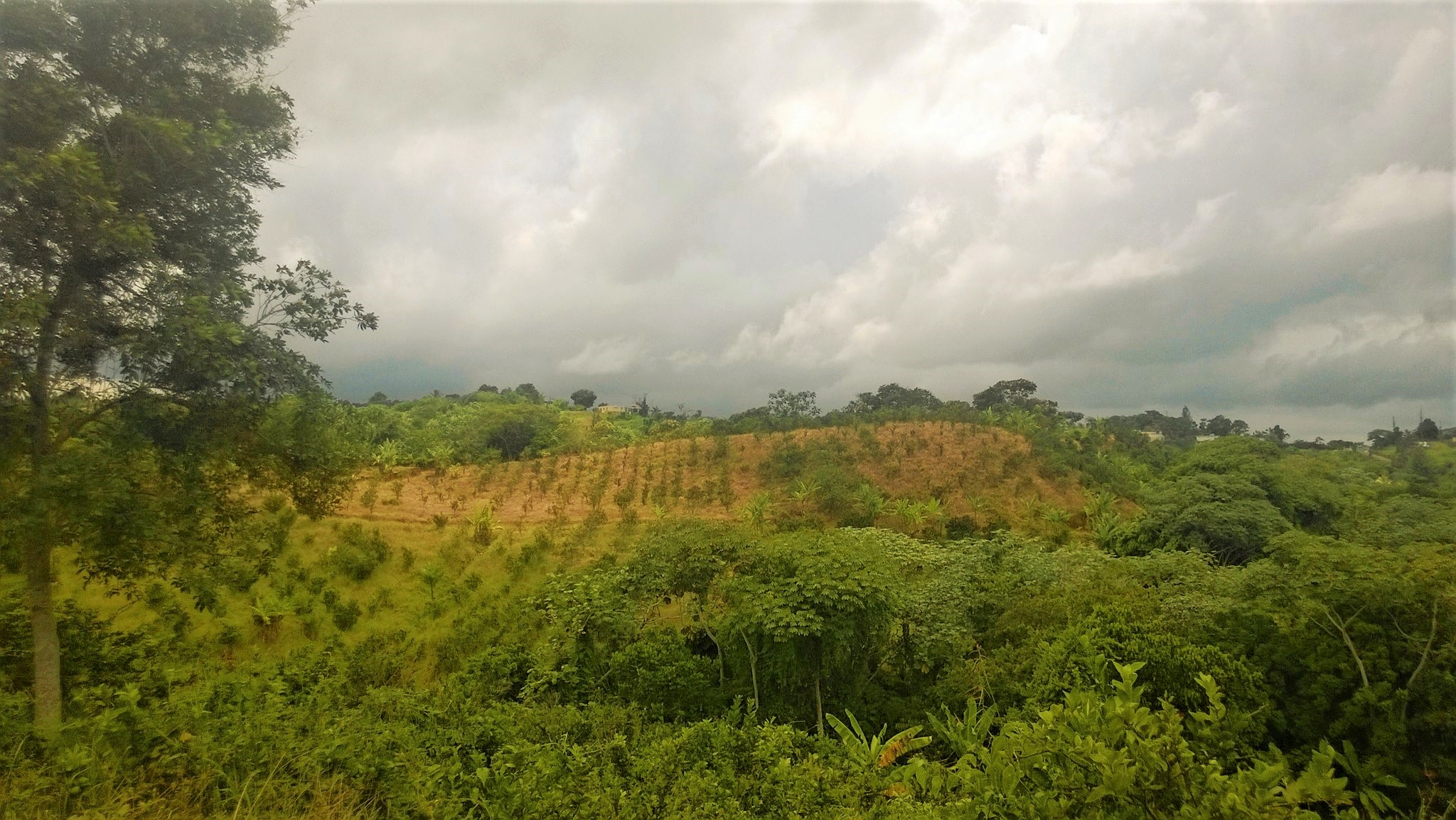
- Agricultural landscape in Mirasol

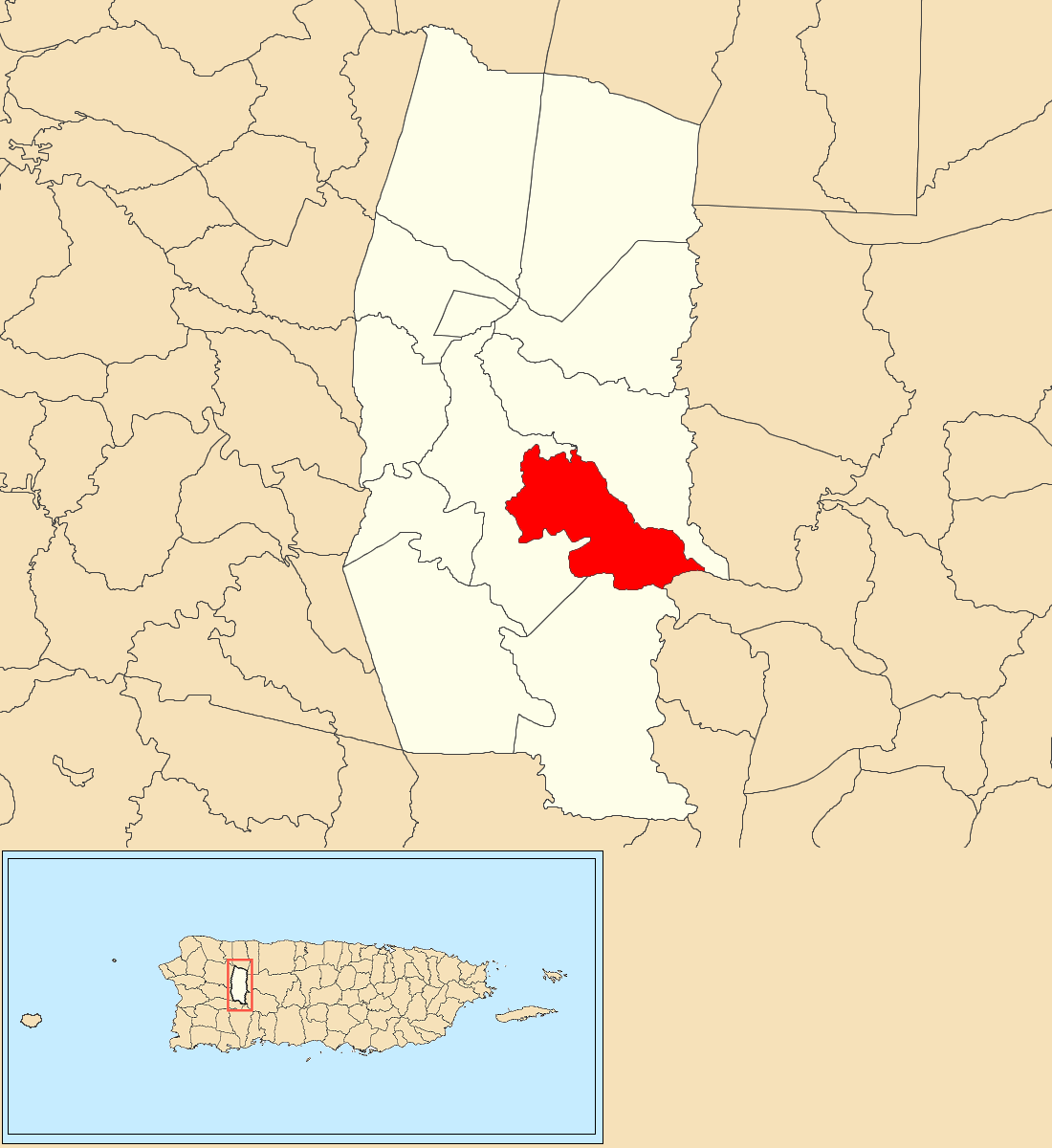
- Location of Mirasol barrio within the municipality of Lares shown in red

- Location of Puerto Rico
- Coordinates: 18°14′39″N 66°51′01″W
- Commonwealth: Puerto Rico
- Municipality: Lares

Area
  - Total: 3.71 sq mi (9.6 km^{2})
  - Land: 3.71 sq mi (9.6 km^{2})
  - Water: 0 sq mi (0 km^{2})
- Elevation: 1,414 ft (431 m)

Population (2010)
  - Total: 938
  - Density: 252.8/sq mi (97.6/km^{2})
- Source: 2010 Census
- Time zone: UTC−4 (AST)

Mirasol is a barrio in the municipality of Lares, Puerto Rico. Its population in 2010 was 938.

== History ==
Mirasol was in Spain's gazetteers until Puerto Rico was ceded by Spain in the aftermath of the Spanish–American War under the terms of the Treaty of Paris of 1898 and became an unincorporated territory of the United States. In 1899, the United States Department of War conducted a census of Puerto Rico finding that the population of Mirasol barrio was 1,027.

Historical population
Census	Pop.	Note	%±
1900	1,027		—
1910	1,215		18.3%
1920	1,412		16.2%
1930	1,346		−4.7%
1940	1,296		−3.7%
1950	1,477		14.0%
1960	1,433		−3.0%
1970	989		−31.0%
1980	1,034		4.6%
1990	949		−8.2%
2000	1,510		59.1%
2010	938		−37.9%
U.S. Decennial Census; 1899 (shown as 1900) 1910-1930; 1930-1950 1980-2000 2010

== Sectors ==
Barrios (which are, in contemporary times, roughly comparable to minor civil divisions) and subbarrios, in turn, are further subdivided into smaller local populated place areas/units called sectores (sectors in English). The types of sectores may vary, from normally sector to urbanización to reparto to barriada to residencial, among others.

The following sectors are in Mirasol barrio:

Comunidad Los 40, El Banco, La Loma, La Vega Calcerrada, Parcelas Angela Vilella, and Sector Boquerón.

== See also ==
- List of communities in Puerto Rico
- List of barrios and sectors of Lares, Puerto Rico
