= Playa, Añasco, Puerto Rico =

Barrio of Puerto Rico

Playa
- Barrio
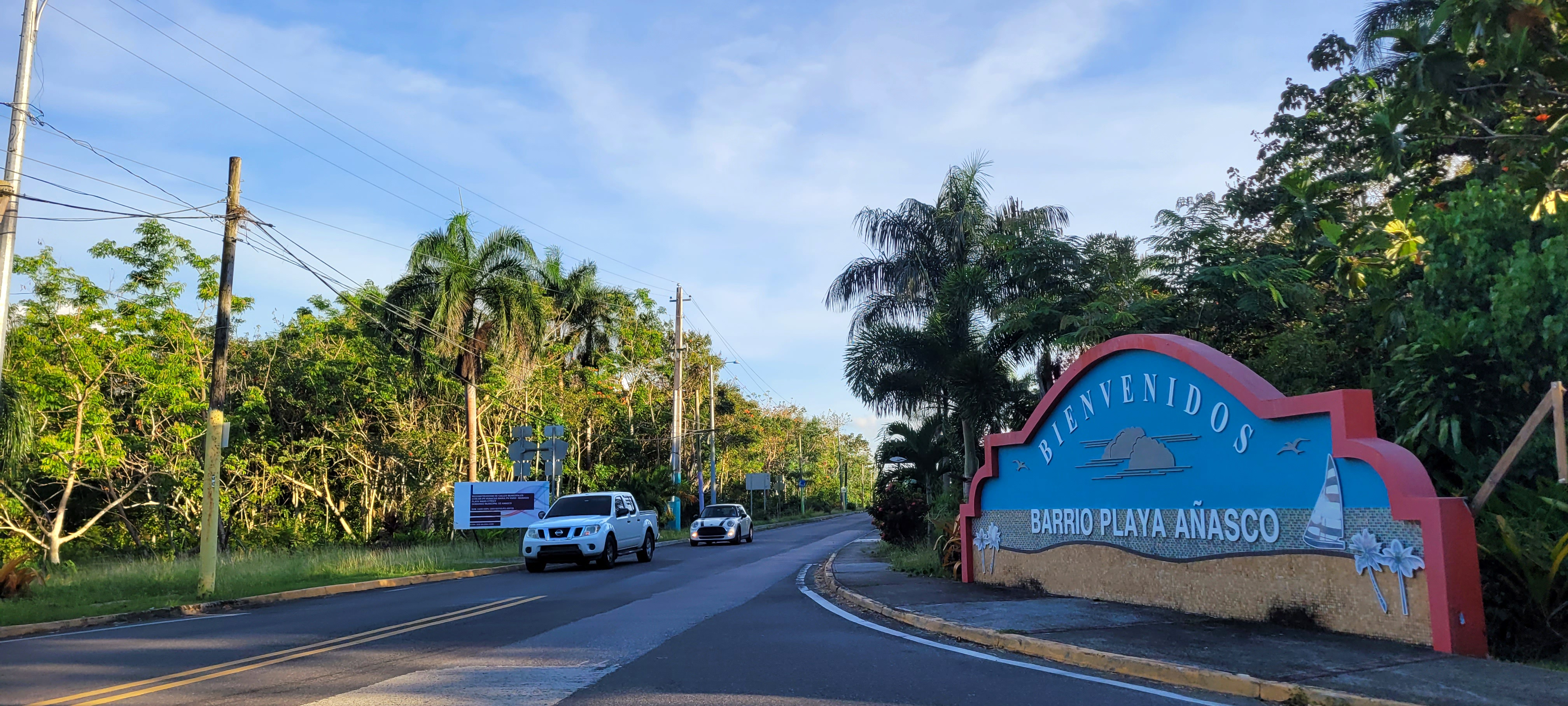
- Puerto Rico Highway 401 heading to Playa from Hatillo

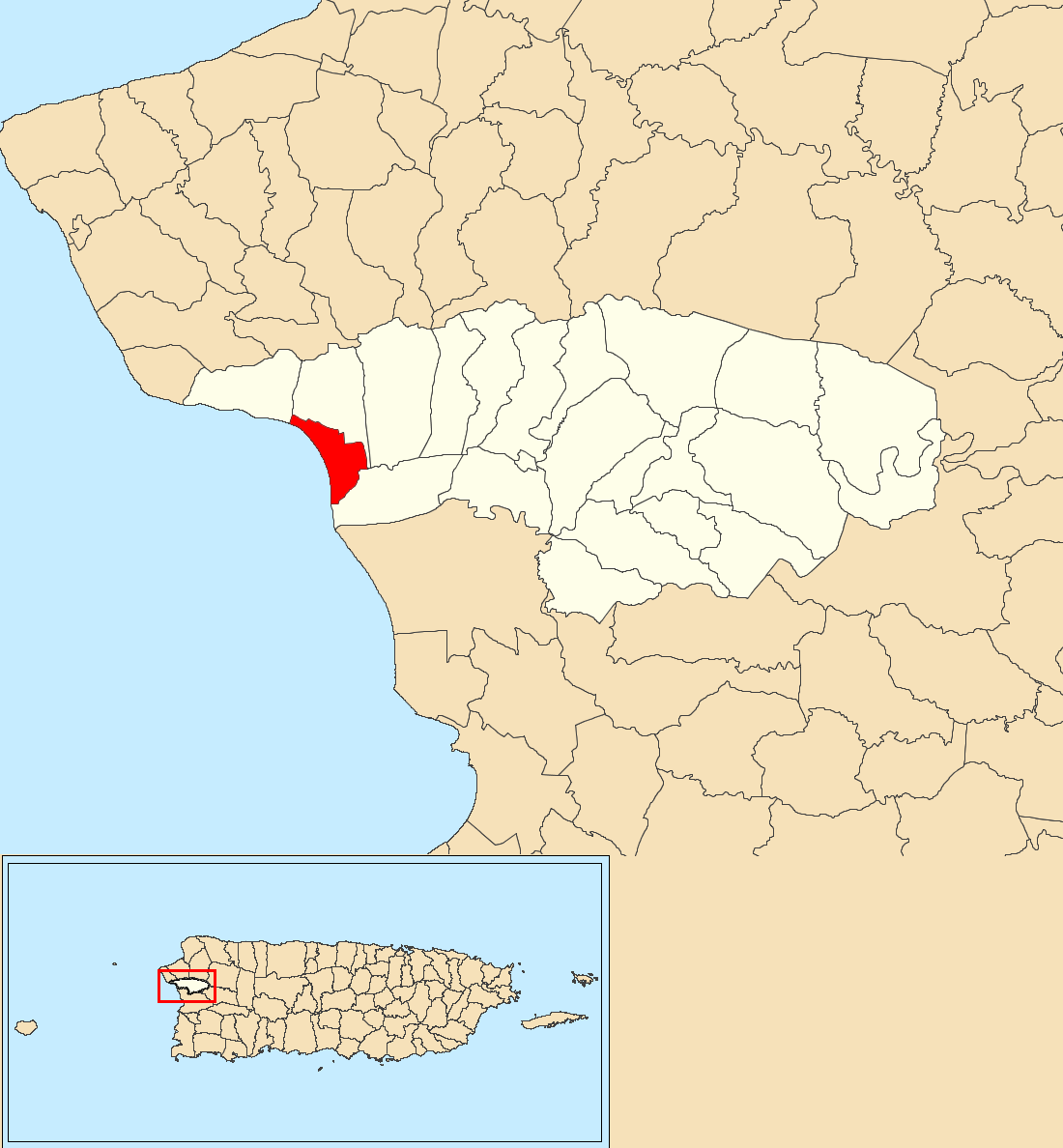
- Location of Playa within the municipality of Añasco shown in red

- Location of Puerto Rico
- Coordinates: 18°17′06″N 67°11′28″W
- Commonwealth: Puerto Rico
- Municipality: Añasco

Area
  - Total: 1.22 sq mi (3.2 km^{2})
  - Land: 0.71 sq mi (1.8 km^{2})
  - Water: 0.51 sq mi (1.3 km^{2})
- Elevation: 7 ft (2.1 m)

Population (2010)
  - Total: 1,498
  - Density: 2,109.9/sq mi (814.6/km^{2})
- Source: 2010 Census
- Time zone: UTC−4 (AST)

Playa is a barrio in the municipality of Añasco, Puerto Rico. Its population in 2010 was 1,498.

== History ==
Playa was in Spain's gazetteers until Puerto Rico was ceded by Spain in the aftermath of the Spanish–American War under the terms of the Treaty of Paris of 1898 and became an unincorporated territory of the United States. In 1899, the United States Department of War conducted a census of Puerto Rico finding that the combined population of Playa and Caguabo barrios was 1,156.

Historical population
Census	Pop.	Note	%±
1910	620		—
1920	433		−30.2%
1930	459		6.0%
1940	564		22.9%
1950	663		17.6%
1960	1,234		86.1%
1970	1,454		17.8%
1980	1,851		27.3%
1990	1,725		−6.8%
2000	1,652		−4.2%
2010	1,498		−9.3%
U.S. Decennial Census; 1900 (N/A) 1910-1930; 1930-1950 1980-2000 2010

== Sectors ==
Barrios (which are, in contemporary times, roughly comparable to minor civil divisions) in turn are further subdivided into smaller local populated place areas/units called sectores (sectors in English). The types of sectores may vary, from normally sector to urbanización to reparto to barriada to residencial, among others.

The following sectors are in Playa barrio:

Parcelas Playa, Reparto Los Robles, Sector La Puente, Sector La Vía, Sector Tres Hermanos, and Sector Urbanización.

== See also ==
- List of communities in Puerto Rico
- List of barrios and sectors of Añasco, Puerto Rico
