= List of barrios and sectors of Añasco, Puerto Rico =

Like all municipalities of Puerto Rico, Añasco is subdivided into administrative units called barrios, which are, in contemporary times, roughly comparable to minor civil divisions, (and means wards or boroughs or neighborhoods in English). The barrios and subbarrios, in turn, are further subdivided into smaller local populated place areas/units called sectores (sectors in English). The types of sectores may vary, from normally sector to urbanización to reparto to barriada to residencial, among others. Some sectors appear in two barrios.

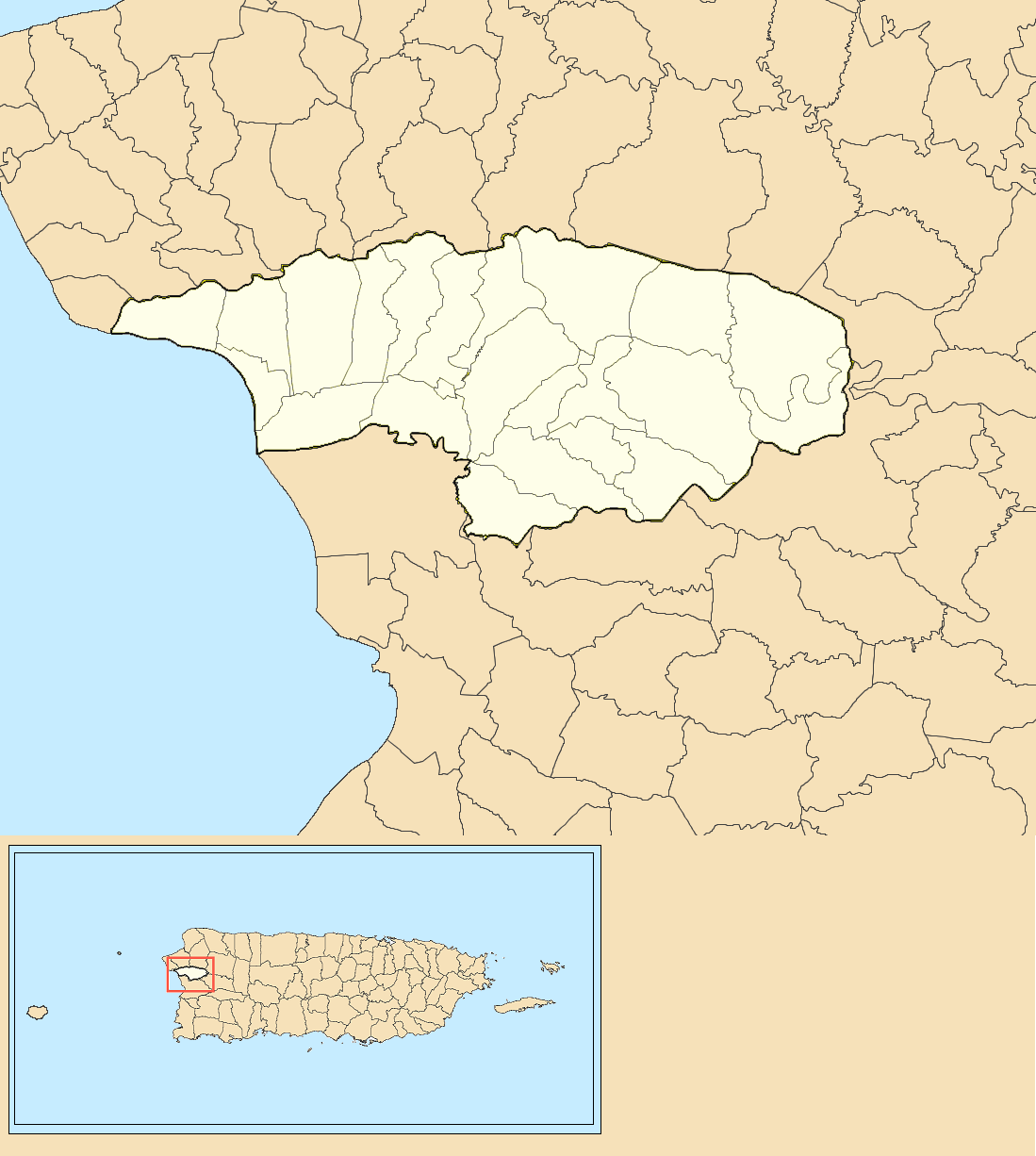
Añasco map with barrio subdivisions

== List of sectors by barrio ==
=== Añasco Abajo ===
- Pozo Hondo
- Sector El Puente
- Sector La Pista

=== Añasco Arriba ===
- Carretera 109
- Extensión Brisas de Añasco
- Jardines de Añasco
- Sector Nicolás Soto Ramos
- Urbanización Brisas de Añasco
- Urbanización Sixto Nieto

=== Añasco barrio-pueblo ===
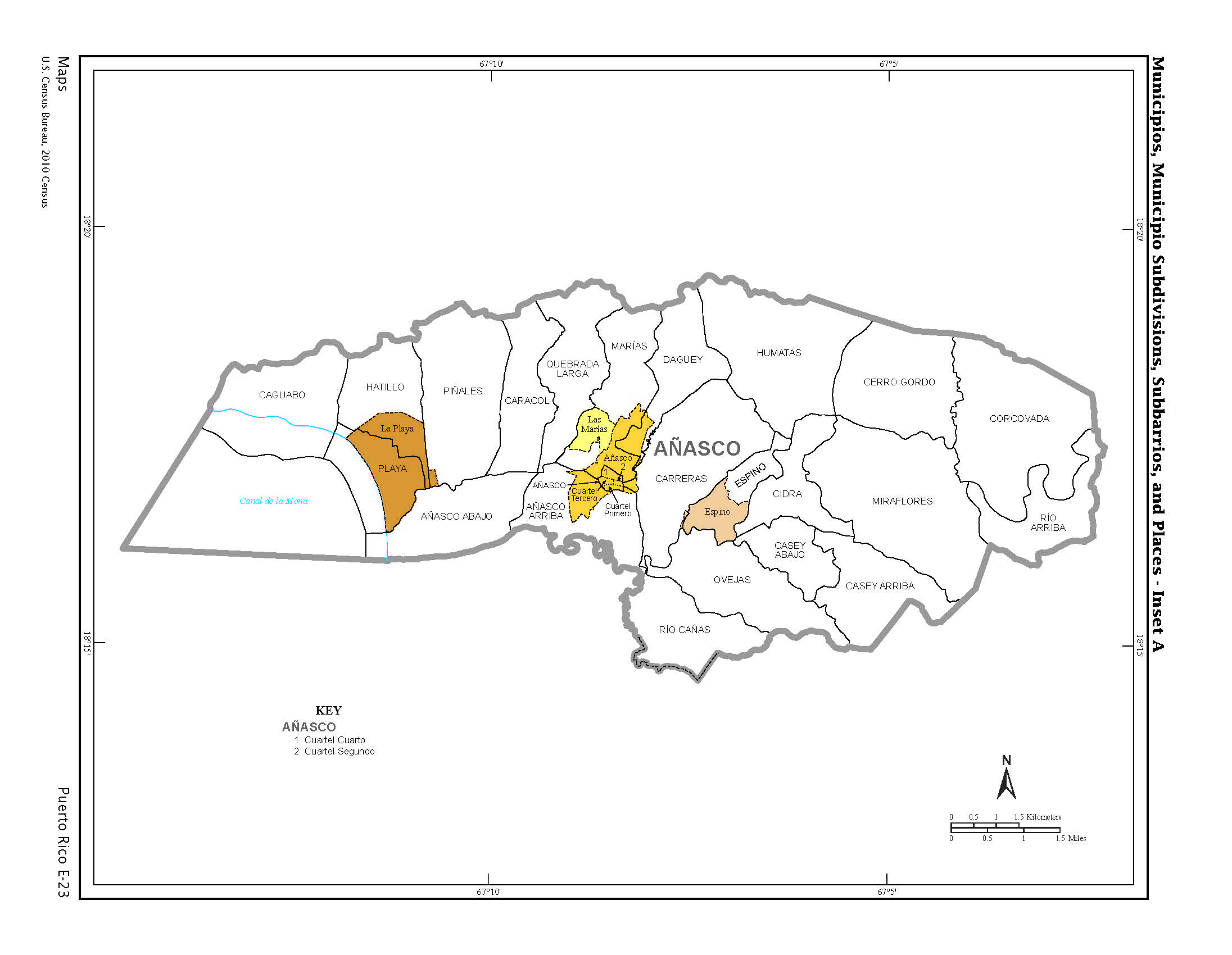
US 2010 Census map of Municipios, Municipio Subdivisions, Subbarrios, and Places of Añasco

- Casco del Pueblo
- Edificio Diego Salcedo
- Edificio Francis Villages Elderly
- Edificio Victoria
- Urbanización Carlos Feria
- Urbanización Los Maestros
- Urbanización Villas de Añasco

=== Caguabo ===
- Condominio Playa Almirante
- Sector La Ferrer
- Sector La Tosca
- Sector Las Curvas de Rincón

=== Caracol ===
- Carretera 402
- Sector Agustín Matías
- Sector Cabo Díaz
- Sector Calzadera
- Sector Caracol Abajo
- Sector Caracol Arriba
- Sector La Variante
- Sector Pepe Pratts
- Sector Peyo Valentín

=== Carreras ===
- Edificio Paseo del Río

=== Casey Abajo ===
- Carretera 406

=== Casey Arriba ===
- Sector Mata y Orsini
- Sector Pepe Traval

=== Cerro Gordo ===
- Camino Los Tres Reyes Magos
- Carretera 405

=== Cidra ===
- Carretera 109
- Sector La Cuchilla
- Sector La Sabana

=== Corcovada ===
- Carretera 109

=== Dagüey ===
- Barrio Dagüey Arriba
- Calle Dagüey
- Calle Victoria
- Carretera 404
- Extensión Sagrado Corazón
- Extensión San Antonio
- Imperial Court
- Parcelas Ajíes
- Residencial Francisco Figueroa
- Sector Ajíes
- Sector Dagüey
- Urbanización Jardines de Dagüey
- Urbanización Los Flamboyanes
- Urbanización Reparto Dagüey
- Urbanización Sagrado Corazón
- Urbanización San Antonio

=== Espino ===
- Carretera 109
- Parcelas de Josefa
- Sector Solares Lorenzo Rivera
- Sector Valle Hermoso
- Urbanización Alturas de Añasco

=== Hatillo ===
- Agrones
- Edificio La Sirena
- Goyo Carrero
- Sector La Ferrer
- Sector La Variante
- Sector Peyo Valentín

=== Humatas ===
- Carretera 109
- Carretera 405
- Lorenzo Rivera
- Pagán
- Ramal 4402
- Sector Luis Mercado
- Urbanización Alturas de Librada
- Urbanización Colinas de Libradas
- Urbanización Estancia de Santa María
- Urbanización Estancia Valle Verde
- Urbanización Lirios del Valle
- Urbanización Rocío del Valle
- Urbanización Vista del Río
- Urbanización Vistas del Río Apartments
- Villa Avilés

=== Marías ===
- Barrio Marías Arriba
- Carretera 402
- Extensión Los Flamboyanes
- Parcelas Marías
- Sector El Salto
- Sector La Variante
- Sector Valle Hermoso
- Urbanización Jardines de la Encantada
- Urbanización Valle Real

=== Miraflores ===
- Carretera 109

=== Ovejas ===
- Égida Sendero de Amor
- Extensión Aquilino
- Parcelas Aquilino
- Ramal 4430
- Reparto Rosario
- Sector Camino Arrarás
- Sector Picheto Flores
- Tramo Carretera 430

=== Piñales ===
- Piñales Tino Matías
- Sector Cuesta Juan Vega
- Sector Hacienda Libertad
- Sector La Choza
- Sector Piñales Abajo
- Sector Piñales Arriba
- Urbanización Mansiones de Añasco
- Urbanización Paseo del Valle
- Urbanización Valle de Añasco

=== Playa ===
- Parcelas Playa
- Reparto Los Robles
- Sector La Puente
- Sector La Vía
- Sector Tres Hermanos
- Sector Urbanización

=== Quebrada Larga ===
- Barrio Quebrada Larga Arriba (Sector La Cadena)
- Sector Sierra Maestra
- Urbanización Estancias de Sierra Maestra

=== Río Arriba ===
There are no sectors in Río Arriba barrio.

=== Río Cañas ===
There are no sectors in Río Cañas barrio.

== See also ==
- List of communities in Puerto Rico
