= Caguabo, Añasco, Puerto Rico =

Barrio of Puerto Rico

Caguabo
- Barrio
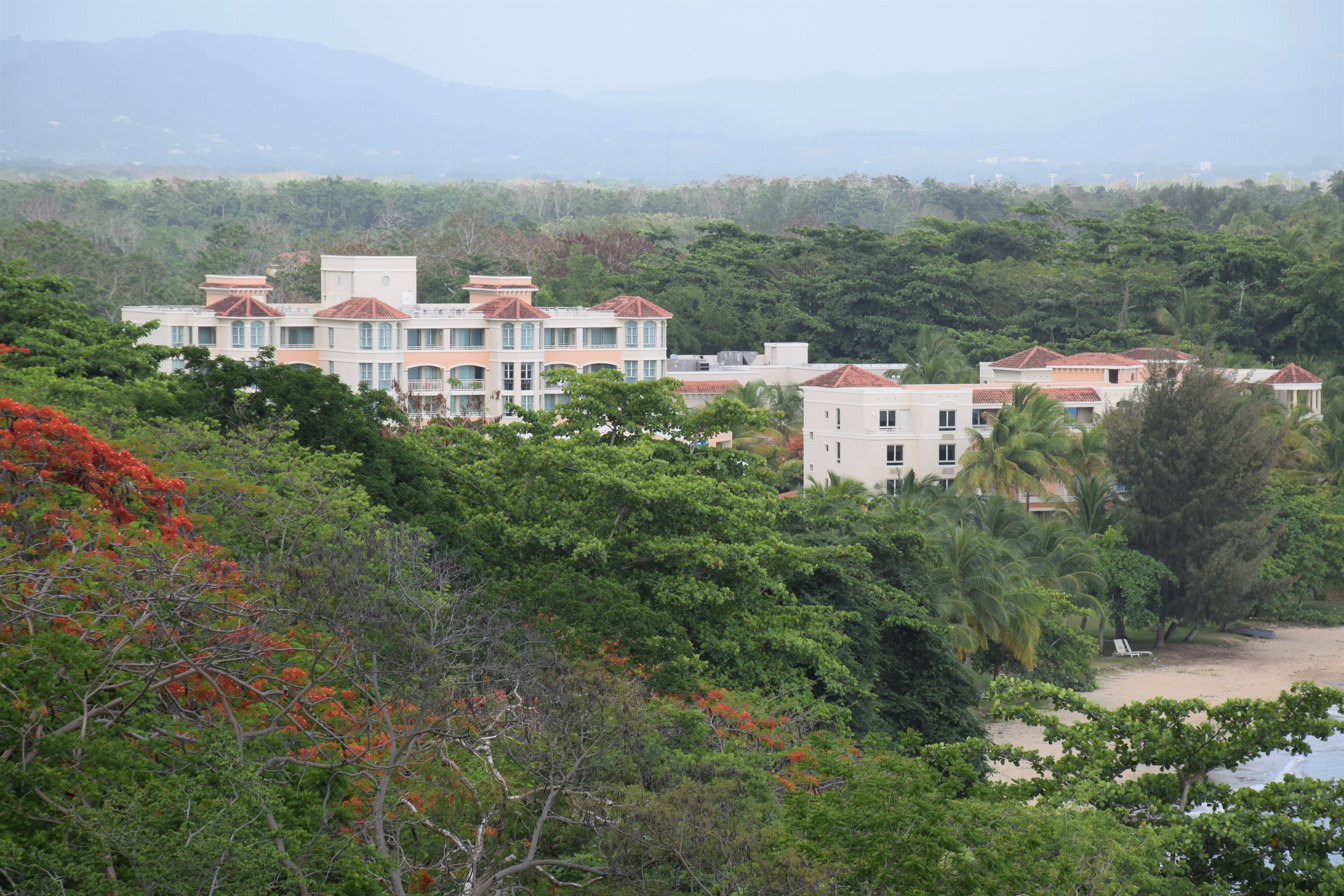
- View of Rincón Beach Resort from Mirador de Añasco in Caguabon

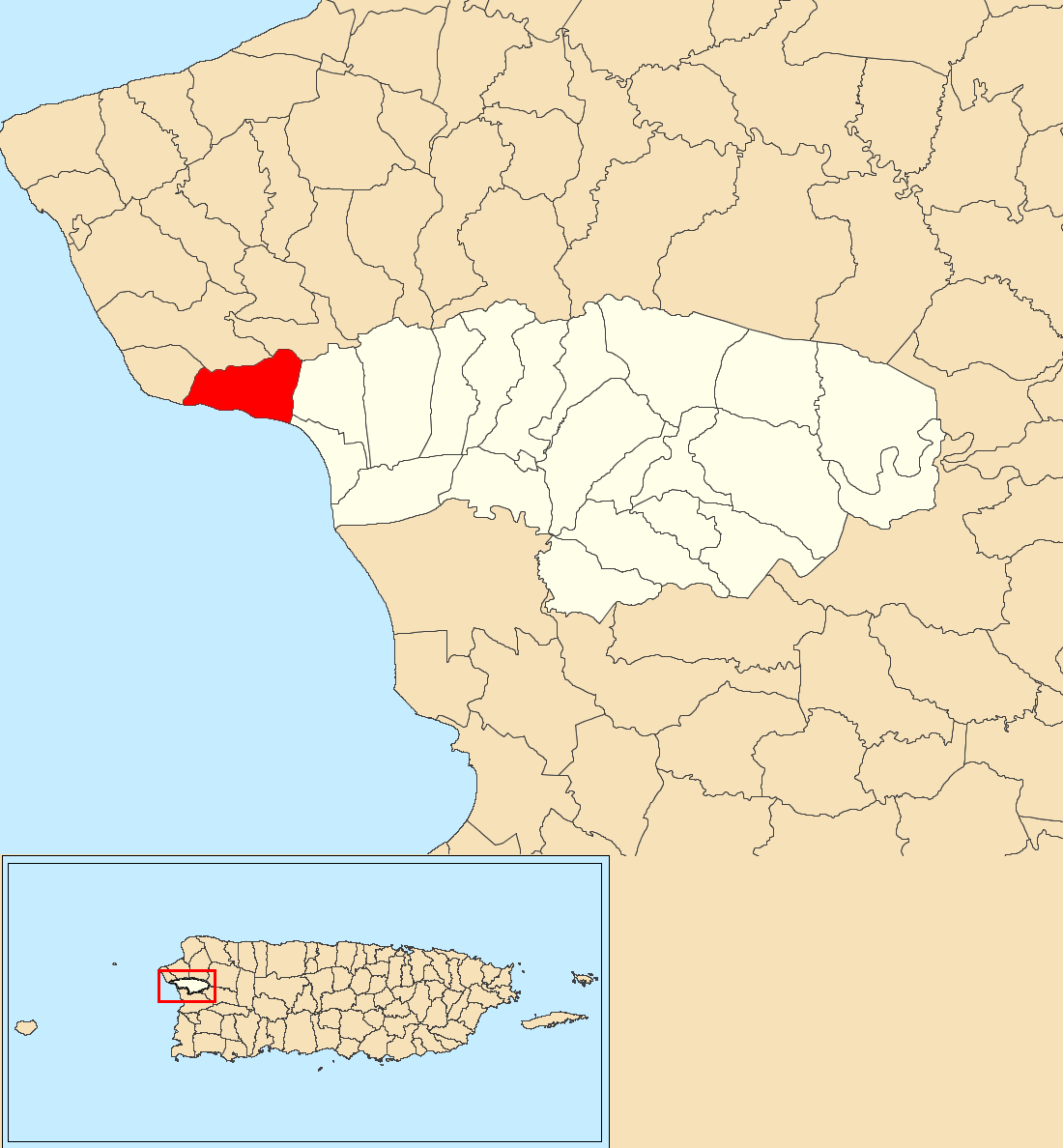
- Location of Caguabo within the municipality of Añasco shown in red

- Location of Puerto Rico
- Coordinates: 18°18′02″N 67°12′47″W
- Commonwealth: Puerto Rico
- Municipality: Añasco

Area
  - Total: 2.23 sq mi (5.8 km^{2})
  - Land: 1.42 sq mi (3.7 km^{2})
  - Water: 0.81 sq mi (2.1 km^{2})
- Elevation: 243 ft (74 m)

Population (2010)
  - Total: 847
  - Density: 596.5/sq mi (230.3/km^{2})
- Source: 2010 Census
- Time zone: UTC−4 (AST)

Caguabo is a barrio in the municipality of Añasco, Puerto Rico. Its population in 2010 was 847.

== History ==
Caguabo was in Spain's gazetteers until Puerto Rico was ceded by Spain in the aftermath of the Spanish–American War under the terms of the Treaty of Paris of 1898 and became an unincorporated territory of the United States. In 1899, the United States Department of War conducted a census of Puerto Rico finding that the combined population of Caguabo and Playa barrios was 1,156.

Historical population
Census	Pop.	Note	%±
1910	746		—
1920	826		10.7%
1930	654		−20.8%
1940	655		0.2%
1950	755		15.3%
1960	675		−10.6%
1970	679		0.6%
1980	724		6.6%
1990	790		9.1%
2000	903		14.3%
2010	847		−6.2%
U.S. Decennial Census; 1900 (N/A) 1910-1930; 1930-1950 1980-2000 2010

== Sectors ==
Barrios (which are like minor civil divisions) in turn are further subdivided into smaller local populated place areas/units called sectores (sectors in English). The types of sectores may vary, from normally sector to urbanización to reparto to barriada to residencial, among others.

The following sectors are in Caguabo barrio:

Condominio Playa Almirante, Sector La Ferrer, Sector La Tosca, and Sector Las Curvas de Rincón.

=== Features ===
There is a three-story tower called El Mirador de la Bahía located in Caguabo, Añasco which overlooks the Mona Passage.

== A "Special Community" ==
In 2014, Caguabo was one of the 742 places on the list of "Special Communities of Puerto Rico" Comunidades Especiales de Puerto Rico.

== Gallery ==
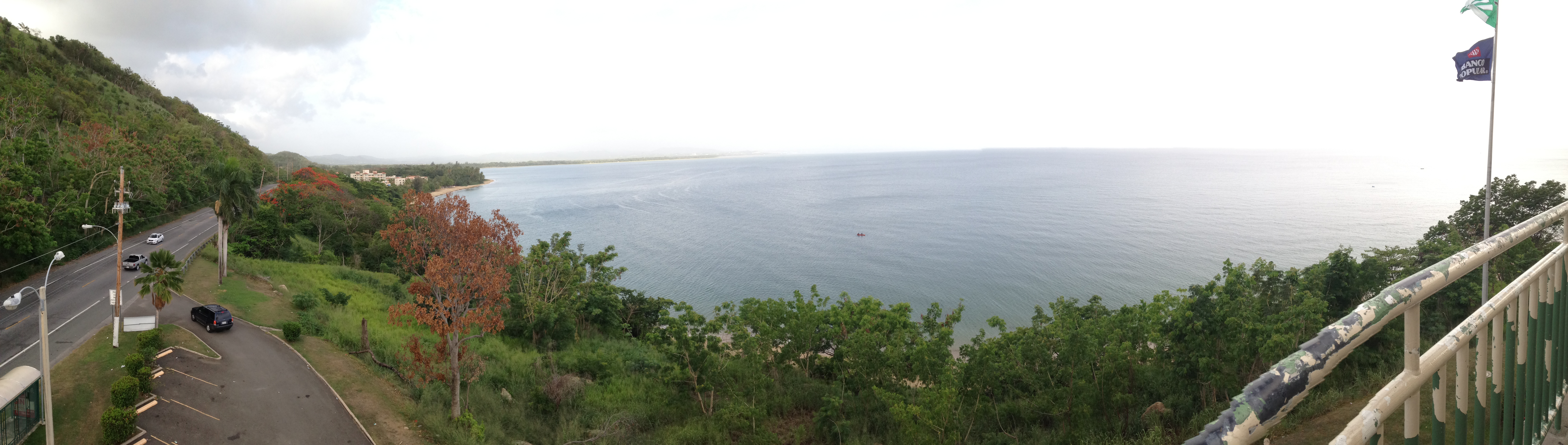
View from El Mirador de la Bahia in Caguabo off PR-115

== See also ==
- List of communities in Puerto Rico
- List of barrios and sectors of Añasco, Puerto Rico
