= MAS Integrated School =

- MASIS

Location
- PR #2 KM 142.6 INT Bo. Caracol; Añasco; Puerto Rico
- Coordinates: 18.3031318°N 67.1573327°W

Information
- Type: Private School
- Motto: Where success is not a coincidence…
- Established: 2009
- Founder: Miriam Avilés Soto
- Headmaster: Miriam Avilés Soto
- Grades: PPK-12
- Gender: Coeducational
- Colors: Green and White
- Athletics: Basketball, Volleyball, and Soccer
- Mascot: Griffin
- Nickname: MASIS
- Accreditation: Cognia
- Website: https://www.masispr.org/

MAS Integrated School ("MASIS") is a bilingual school located in Añasco, Puerto Rico.

== History ==
MAS Integrated School was established in the year 2009 at Añasco, Puerto Rico. Its founder, after working in multiple schools of the area, decided it was time for her to create a school that would benefit the community, and to focus on creating future leaders. This was her dream and she made it true when MASIS opened to 180 students August 9, 2009.

== Mission ==
MAS Integrated School MASIS is an independent, not-for-profit, bilingual school whose mission is to offer an education in which all areas of the student's life are valued and enhanced through the promotion of his/her integral development. MASIS aims to develop a new generation of leaders, equipped with the intellectual and social skills to lead themselves, their communities and the world's changing multicultural society.

== Accreditation and membership ==
MASIS has the Puerto Rico General Council of Education license. Is member of Puerto Rico Private Schools Association (AEP) and is supported by the Center for the Global Integrated Education and Full Circle – Learning Accreditation with the Southern States of Colleges and Schools AdvancED SACS -CASI

== 5K marathon ==
A 5K marathon has been held four years in row to generate funds for school facilities. In 2019, the marathon's funds would be earmarked for a sports facility.
