= Añasco Abajo, Añasco, Puerto Rico =

Barrio of Puerto Rico

Añasco Abajo
- Barrio
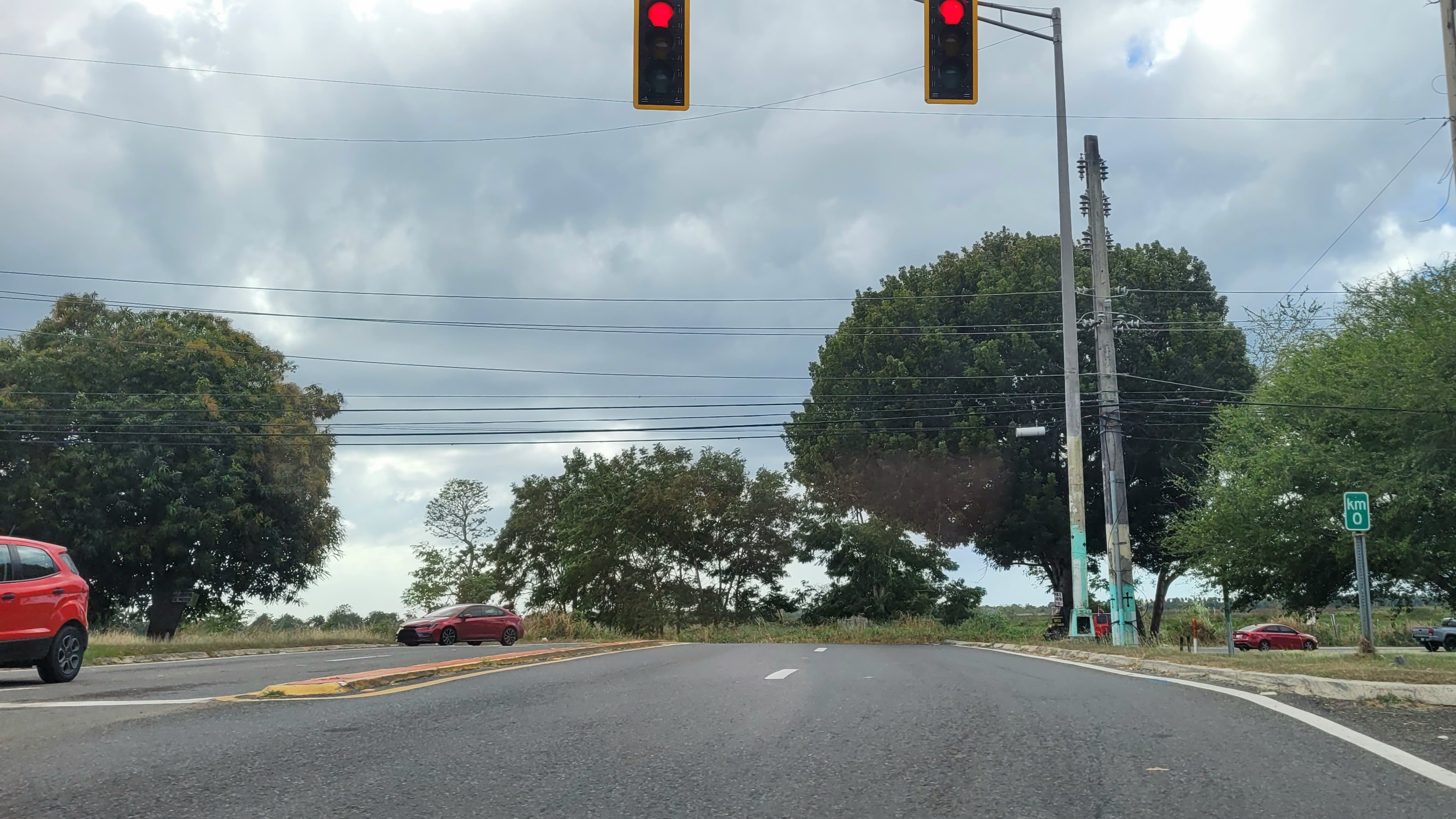
- Puerto Rico Highway 115 in Añasco Abajo

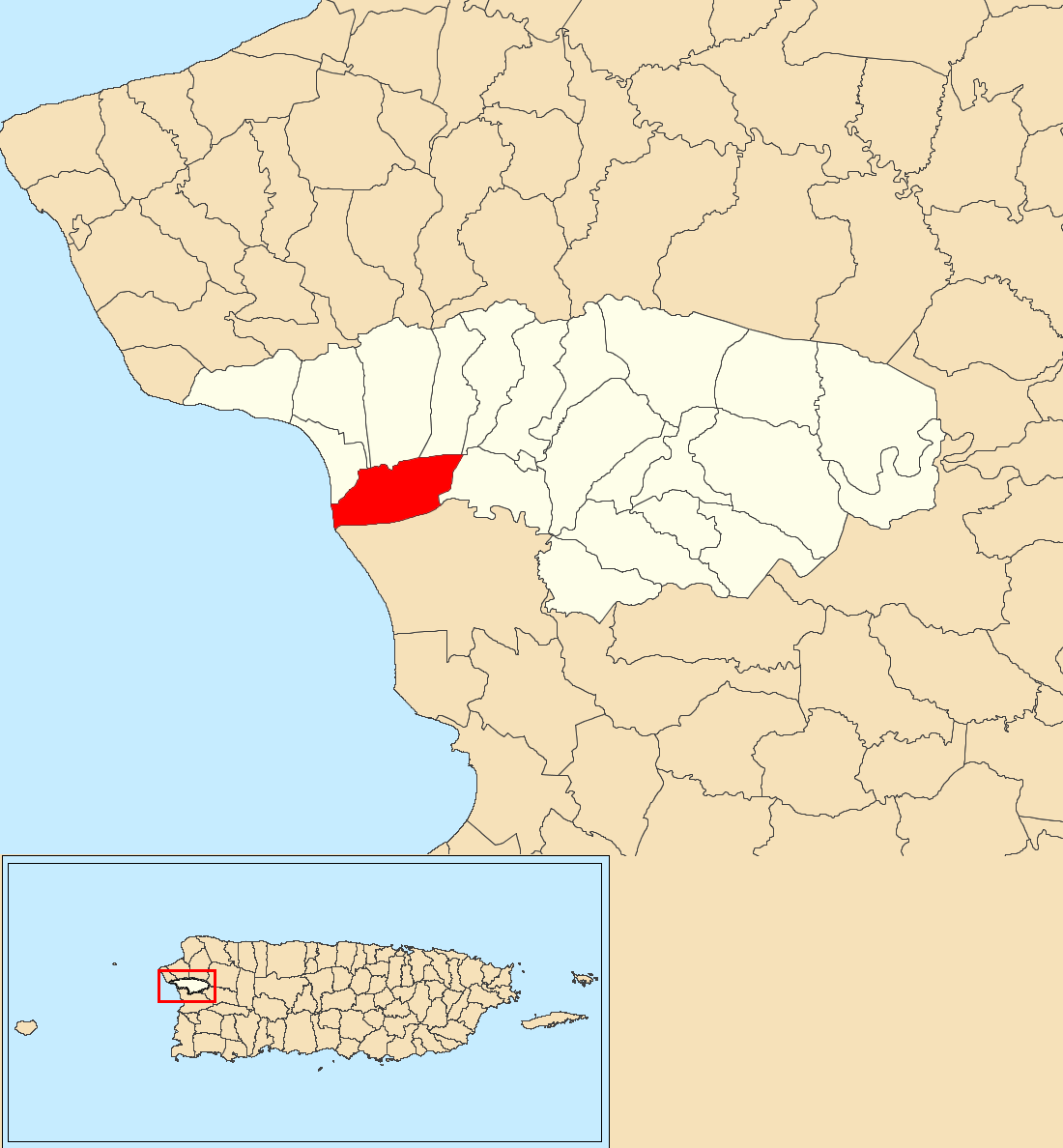
- Location of Añasco Abajo within the municipality of Añasco shown in red

- Location of Puerto Rico
- Coordinates: 18°16′35″N 67°10′27″W
- Commonwealth: Puerto Rico
- Municipality: Añasco

Area
  - Total: 1.72 sq mi (4.5 km^{2})
  - Land: 1.60 sq mi (4.1 km^{2})
  - Water: 0.12 sq mi (0.31 km^{2})
- Elevation: 3 ft (0.91 m)

Population (2010)
  - Total: 6
  - Density: 3.8/sq mi (1.5/km^{2})
- Source: 2010 Census
- Time zone: UTC−4 (AST)

Añasco Abajo Barrio is a barrio in the municipality of Añasco, Puerto Rico. Its population in 2010 was 6.

== History ==
Añasco Abajo was in Spain's gazetteers until Puerto Rico was ceded by Spain in the aftermath of the Spanish–American War under the terms of the Treaty of Paris of 1898 and became an unincorporated territory of the United States. In 1899, the United States Department of War conducted a census of Puerto Rico finding that the combined population of Añasco Abajo and Añasco Arriba barrios was 1,027.

Historical population
Census	Pop.	Note	%±
1910	211		—
1920	208		−1.4%
1930	307		47.6%
1940	87		−71.7%
1950	113		29.9%
1960	19		−83.2%
1970	20		5.3%
1980	34		70.0%
1990	13		−61.8%
2000	32		146.2%
2010	6		−81.2%
U.S. Decennial Census; 1900 (N/A) 1910-1930; 1930-1950 1980-2000 2010

== Sectors ==
Barrios (which are, in contemporary times, roughly comparable to minor civil divisions) in turn are further subdivided into smaller local populated place areas/units called sectores (sectors in English). The types of sectores may vary, from normally sector to urbanización to reparto to barriada to residencial, among others.

The following sectors are in Añasco Abajo barrio:

Pozo Hondo, Sector El Puente, and Sector La Pista.

== See also ==
- List of communities in Puerto Rico
- List of barrios and sectors of Añasco, Puerto Rico
