= Humatas, Añasco, Puerto Rico =

Barrio of Puerto Rico

Humatas
- Barrio
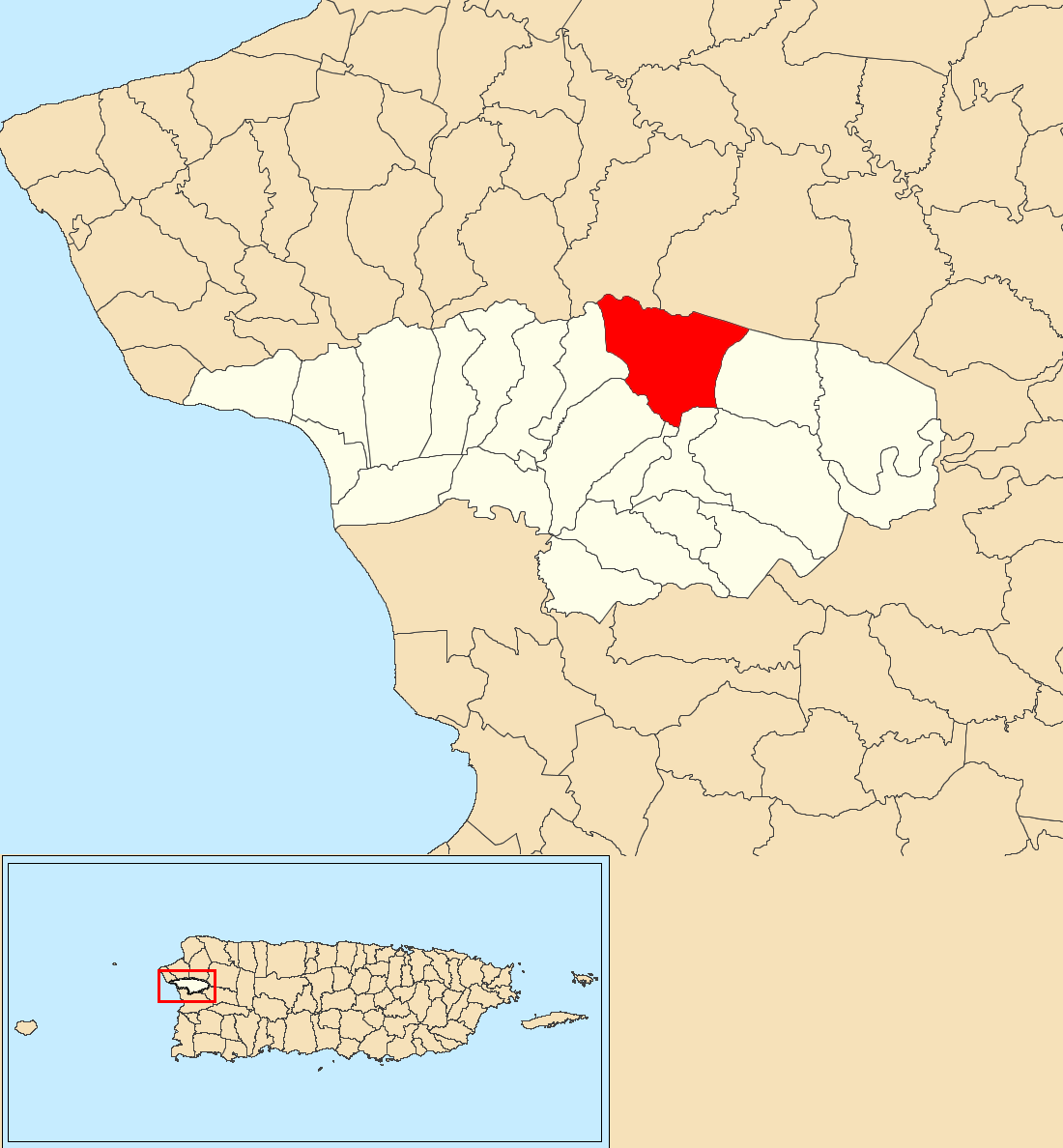
- Location of Humatas within the municipality of Añasco shown in red

- Location of Puerto Rico
- Coordinates: 18°18′33″N 67°06′23″W
- Commonwealth: Puerto Rico
- Municipality: Añasco

Area
  - Total: 2.97 sq mi (7.7 km^{2})
  - Land: 2.97 sq mi (7.7 km^{2})
  - Water: 0.00 sq mi (0 km^{2})
- Elevation: 423 ft (129 m)

Population (2010)
  - Total: 756
  - Density: 254.5/sq mi (98.3/km^{2})
- Source: 2010 Census
- Time zone: UTC−4 (AST)

Humatas is a barrio in the municipality of Añasco, Puerto Rico. Its population in 2010 was 756.

== History ==
Humatas was in Spain's gazetteers until Puerto Rico was ceded by Spain in the aftermath of the Spanish–American War under the terms of the Treaty of Paris of 1898 and became an unincorporated territory of the United States. In 1899, the United States Department of War conducted a census of Puerto Rico finding that the combined population of Humatas and Dagüey barrios was 938.

Historical population
Census	Pop.	Note	%±
1910	381		—
1920	513		34.6%
1930	418		−18.5%
1940	375		−10.3%
1950	385		2.7%
1960	354		−8.1%
1970	282		−20.3%
1980	343		21.6%
1990	441		28.6%
2000	551		24.9%
2010	756		37.2%
U.S. Decennial Census; 1900 (N/A) 1910-1930; 1930-1950 1980-2000 2010

== Sectors ==
Barrios (which are, in contemporary times, roughly comparable to minor civil divisions) in turn are further subdivided into smaller local populated place areas/units called sectores (sectors in English). The types of sectores may vary, from normally sector to urbanización to reparto to barriada to residencial, among others.

The following sectors are in Humatas barrio:

Carretera 109, Carretera 405, Lorenzo Rivera, Pagán, Ramal 4402, Sector Luis Mercado, Urbanización Alturas de Librada, Urbanización Colinas de Libradas, Urbanización Estancia de Santa María, Urbanización Estancia Valle Verde, Urbanización Lirios del Valle, Urbanización Rocío del Valle, Urbanización Vista del Río, Urbanización Vistas del Río Apartments, and Villa Avilés.

== See also ==
- List of communities in Puerto Rico
- List of barrios and sectors of Añasco, Puerto Rico
