= Dagüey, Añasco, Puerto Rico =

Barrio of Puerto Rico

Dagüey
- Barrio
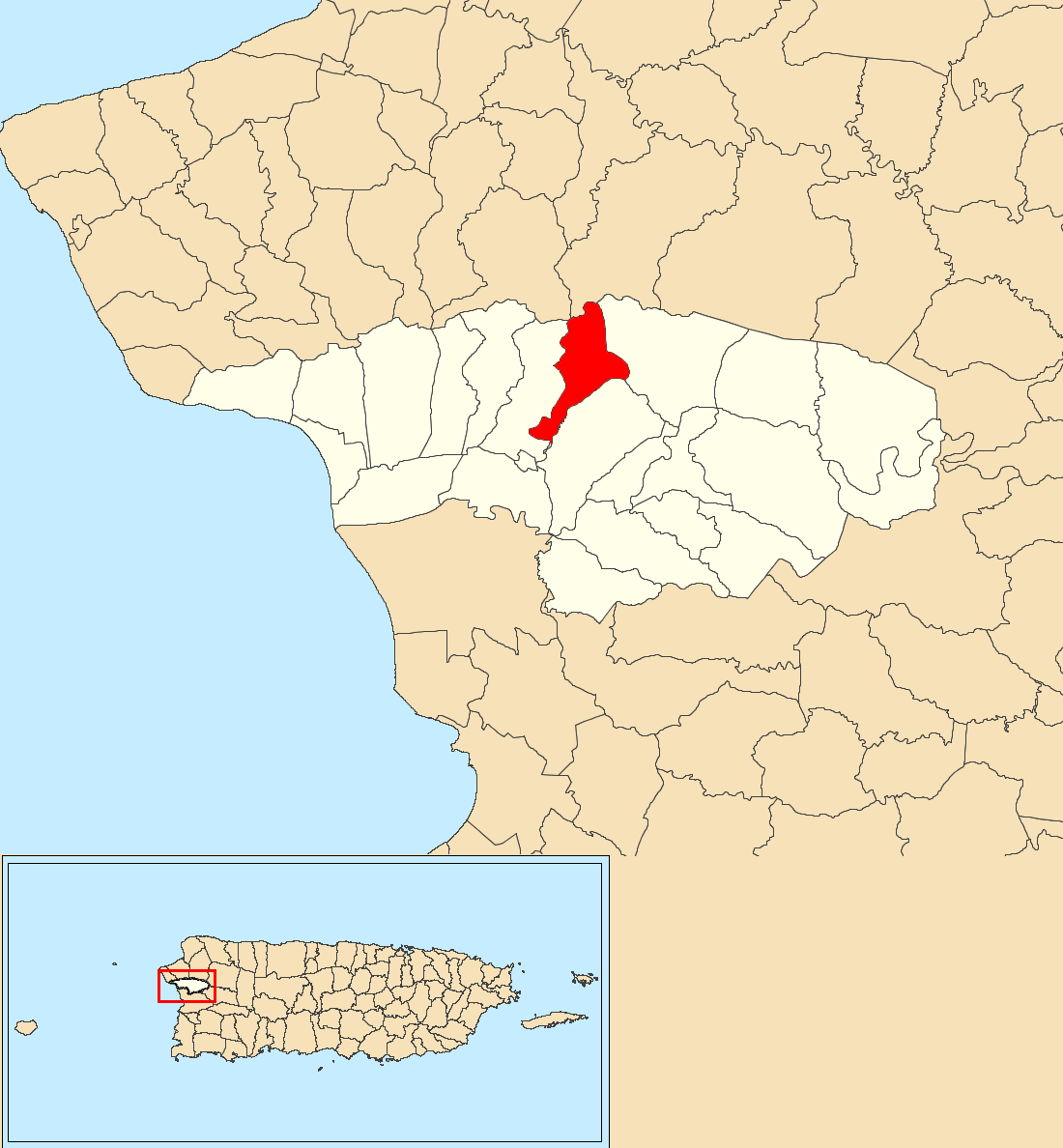
- Location of Dagüey within the municipality of Añasco shown in red

- Location of Puerto Rico
- Coordinates: 18°18′21″N 67°07′39″W
- Commonwealth: Puerto Rico
- Municipality: Añasco

Area
  - Total: 3.4 km^{2} (1.32 sq mi)
  - Land: 3.4 km^{2} (1.32 sq mi)
  - Water: 0 km^{2} (0.00 sq mi)
- Elevation: 75 m (246 ft)

Population (2010)
  - Total: 1,626
  - Density: 475.6/km^{2} (1,231.8/sq mi)
- Source: 2010 Census
- Time zone: UTC−4 (AST)

Dagüey is a barrio in the municipality of Añasco, Puerto Rico. Its population in 2010 was 1,626.

== History ==
Dagüey was in Spain's gazetteers until Puerto Rico was ceded by Spain in the aftermath of the Spanish–American War under the terms of the Treaty of Paris of 1898 and became an unincorporated territory of the United States. In 1899, the United States Department of War conducted a census of Puerto Rico finding that the combined population of Dagüey and Humatas barrios was 938.

Historical population
Census	Pop.	Note	%±
1910	577		—
1920	555		−3.8%
1930	692		24.7%
1940	706		2.0%
1950	621		−12.0%
1960	532		−14.3%
1970	0		−100.0%
1980	1,174		—
1990	2,118		80.4%
2000	1,891		−10.7%
2010	1,626		−14.0%
U.S. Decennial Census; 1900 (N/A) 1910-1930; 1930-1950 1980-2000 2010

== Sectors ==
Barrios (which are, in contemporary times, roughly comparable to minor civil divisions) in turn are further subdivided into smaller local populated place areas/units called sectores (sectors in English). The types of sectores may vary, from normally sector to urbanización to reparto to barriada to residencial, among others.

The following sectors are in Dagüey barrio:

Barrio Dagüey Arriba, Calle Dagüey, Calle Victoria, Carretera 404, Extensión Sagrado Corazón, Extensión San Antonio, Imperial Court, Parcelas Ajíes, Residencial Francisco Figueroa, Sector Ajíes, Sector Dagüey, Urbanización Jardines de Dagüey, Urbanización Los Flamboyanes, Urbanización Reparto Dagüey, Urbanización Sagrado Corazón, and Urbanización San Antonio.

== See also ==
- List of communities in Puerto Rico
- List of barrios and sectors of Añasco, Puerto Rico
