= Puente de Añasco =

Historic bridge between Añasco and Mayagüez, Puerto Rico

- U.S. National Register of Historic Places
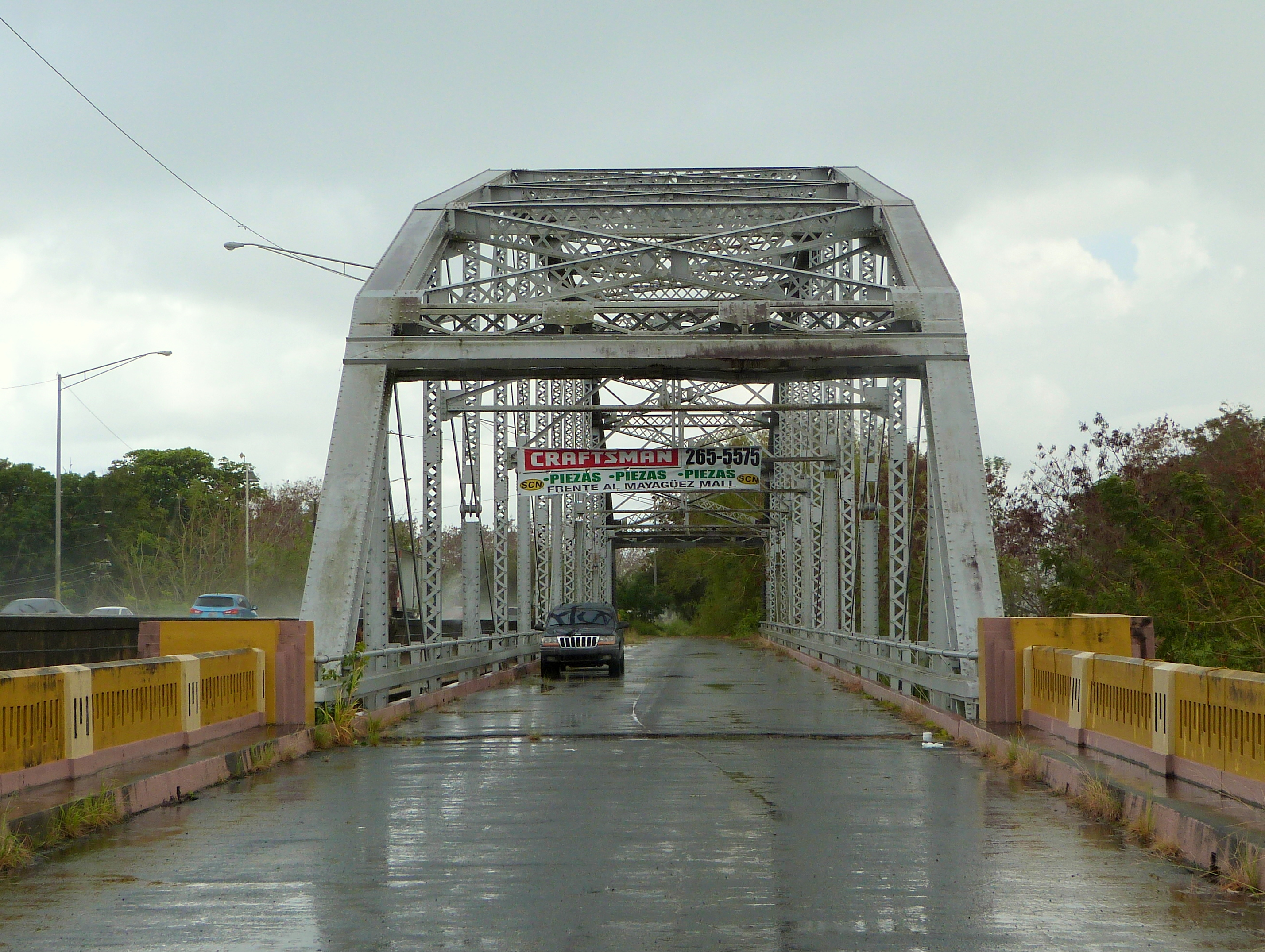

- Location within Puerto Rico
- Location: Añasco, Puerto Rico and Mayagüez, Puerto Rico
- Coordinates: 18.272599°N 67.161676°W
- MPS: Historic Bridges of Puerto Rico MPS
- NRHP reference No.: 11000018
- Added to NRHP: January 18, 2011

The Puente de Añasco, also called Puente Salcedo, is a bridge spanning between Añasco, Puerto Rico, and Mayagüez, Puerto Rico. It was listed on the National Register of Historic Places in 2011. It is located at Kilometer 146.1 of Highway 2.

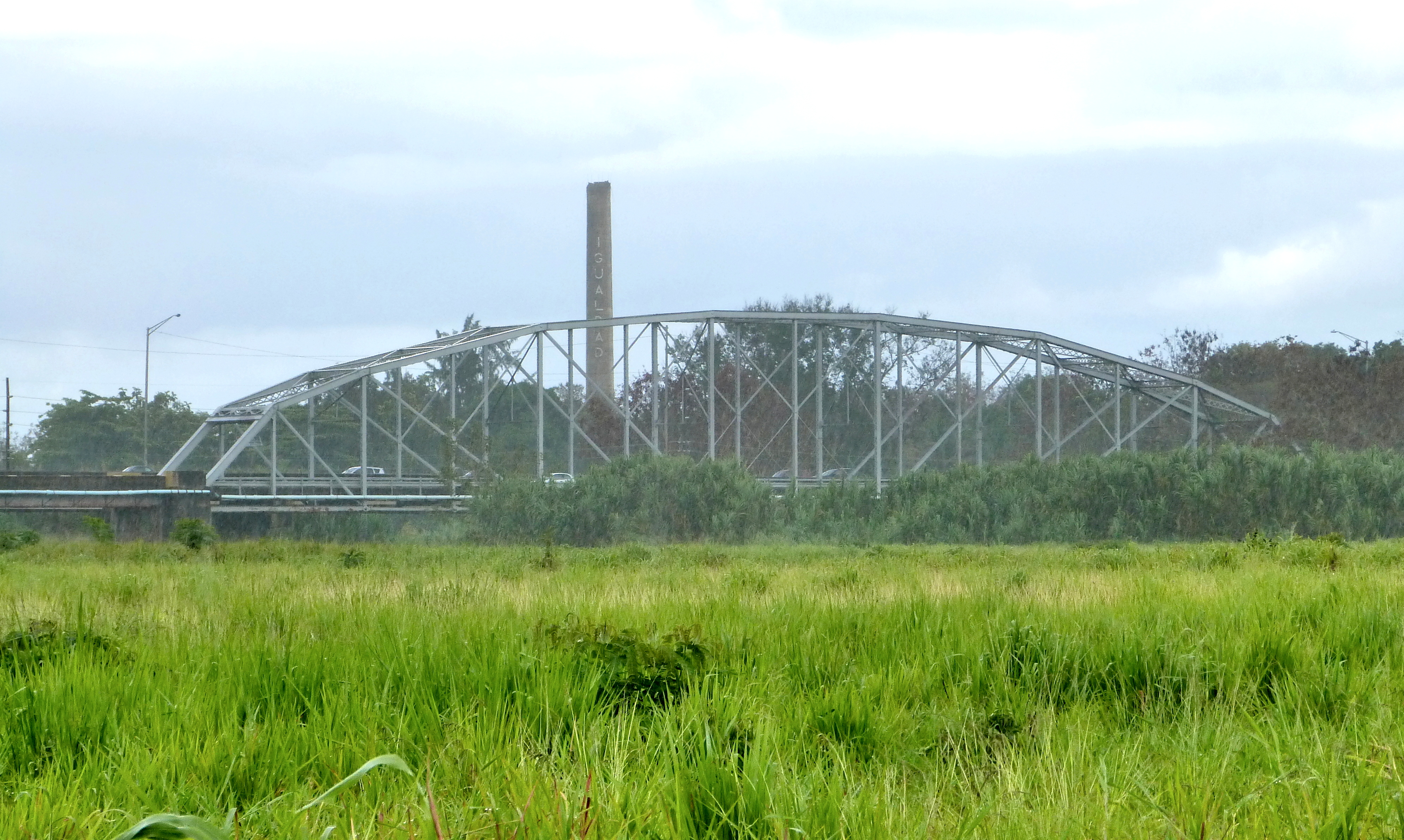
The historic bridge in 2017

It spans the boundary between the Añasco Arriba barrio in the municipality of Añasco and the Sabanetas barrio in the city of Mayagüez. The bridge bears a striking similarity to the Puente de Trujillo Alto, another Pennsylvania through truss bridge built during 1939–1941 in the Trujillo Alto municipality of Puerto Rico.

It may be Bridge No. 75, described in a review of historic bridges in Puerto Rico, which is a single-span Pennsylvania through truss railroad bridge built over the Añasco River in 1944.
