= Caracol, Añasco, Puerto Rico =

Barrio of Puerto Rico

Caracol
- Barrio
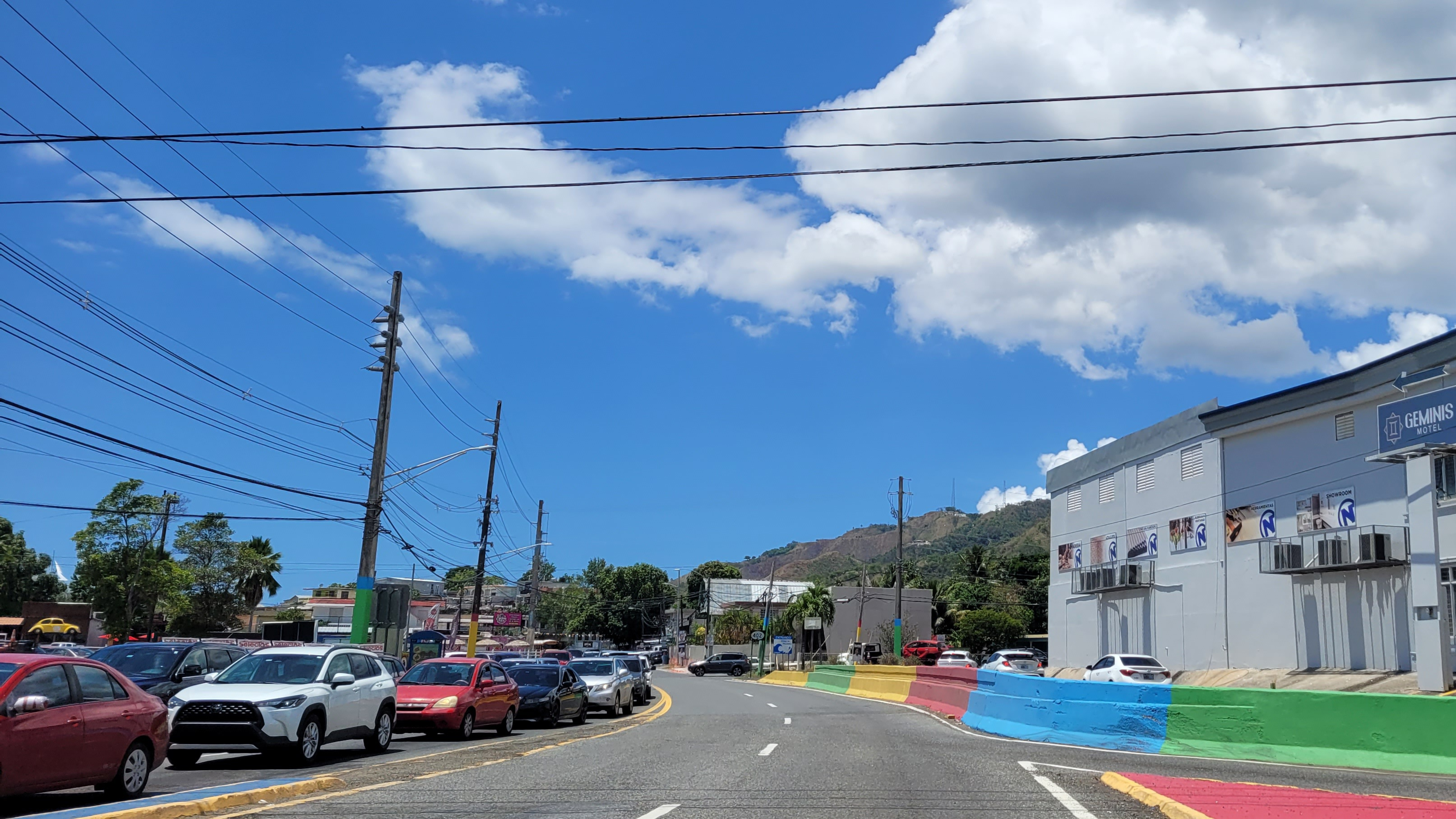
- Puerto Rico Highway 402 in Caracol

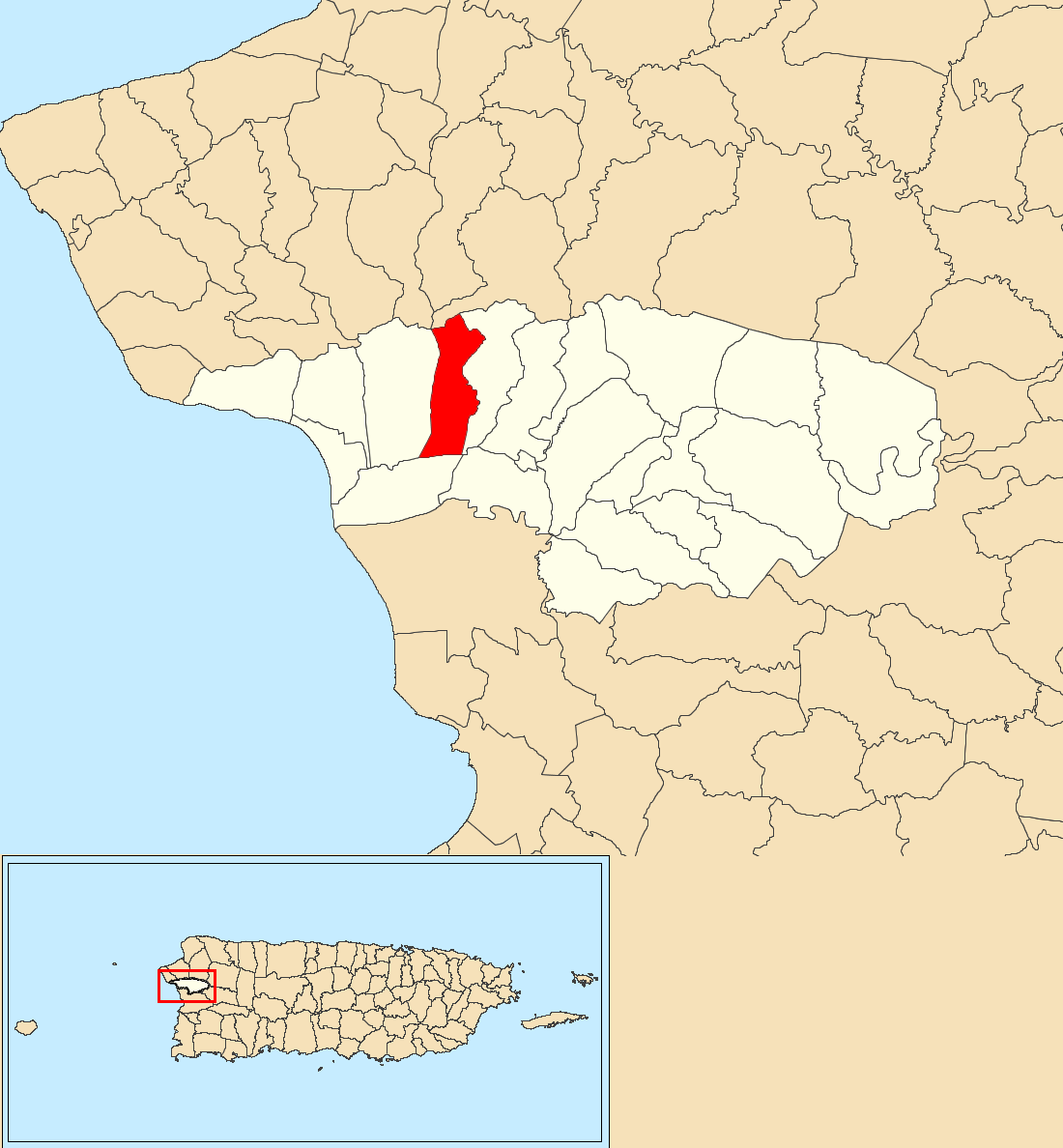
- Location of Caracol within the municipality of Añasco shown in red

- Location of Puerto Rico
- Coordinates: 18°18′02″N 67°09′34″W
- Commonwealth: Puerto Rico
- Municipality: Añasco

Area
  - Total: 1.40 sq mi (3.6 km^{2})
  - Land: 1.40 sq mi (3.6 km^{2})
  - Water: 0.00 sq mi (0 km^{2})
- Elevation: 79 ft (24 m)

Population (2010)
  - Total: 1,869
  - Density: 1,335/sq mi (515/km^{2})
- Source: 2010 Census
- Time zone: UTC−4 (AST)

Caracol is a barrio in the municipality of Añasco, Puerto Rico. Its population in 2010 was 1,869.

== History ==
Caracol was in Spain's gazetteers until Puerto Rico was ceded by Spain in the aftermath of the Spanish–American War under the terms of the Treaty of Paris of 1898 and became an unincorporated territory of the United States. In 1899, the United States Department of War conducted a census of Puerto Rico finding that the combined population of Caracol and Hatillo barrios was 1,030.

Historical population
Census	Pop.	Note	%±
1910	486		—
1920	608		25.1%
1930	604		−0.7%
1940	683		13.1%
1950	736		7.8%
1960	827		12.4%
1970	835		1.0%
1980	888		6.3%
1990	909		2.4%
2000	1,037		14.1%
2010	1,869		80.2%
U.S. Decennial Census; 1900 (N/A) 1910-1930; 1930-1950 1980-2000 2010

== Sectors ==
Barrios (which are, in contemporary times, roughly comparable to minor civil divisions) in turn are further subdivided into smaller local populated place areas/units called sectores (sectors in English). The types of sectores may vary, from normally sector to urbanización to reparto to barriada to residencial, among others.

The following sectors are in Caracol barrio:

Carretera 402, Sector Agustín Matías, Sector Calzadera, Sector Caracol Abajo, Sector Caracol Arriba, Sector La Variante, Sector Pepe Pratts, and Sector Peyo Valentín.

== See also ==
- List of communities in Puerto Rico
- List of barrios and sectors of Añasco, Puerto Rico
