= Piñales, Añasco, Puerto Rico =

Barrio of Puerto Rico

Piñales
- Barrio
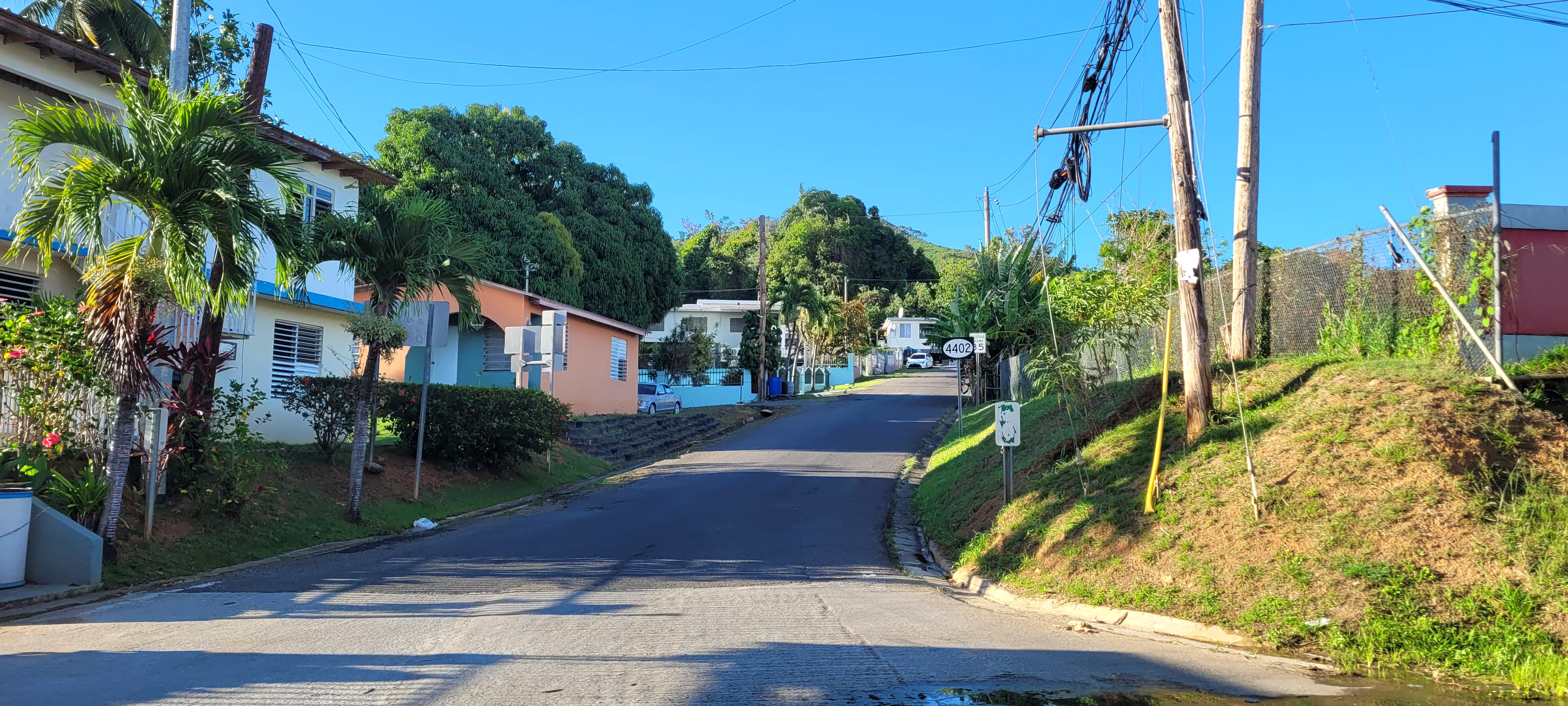
- Puerto Rico Highway 4402 in Piñales

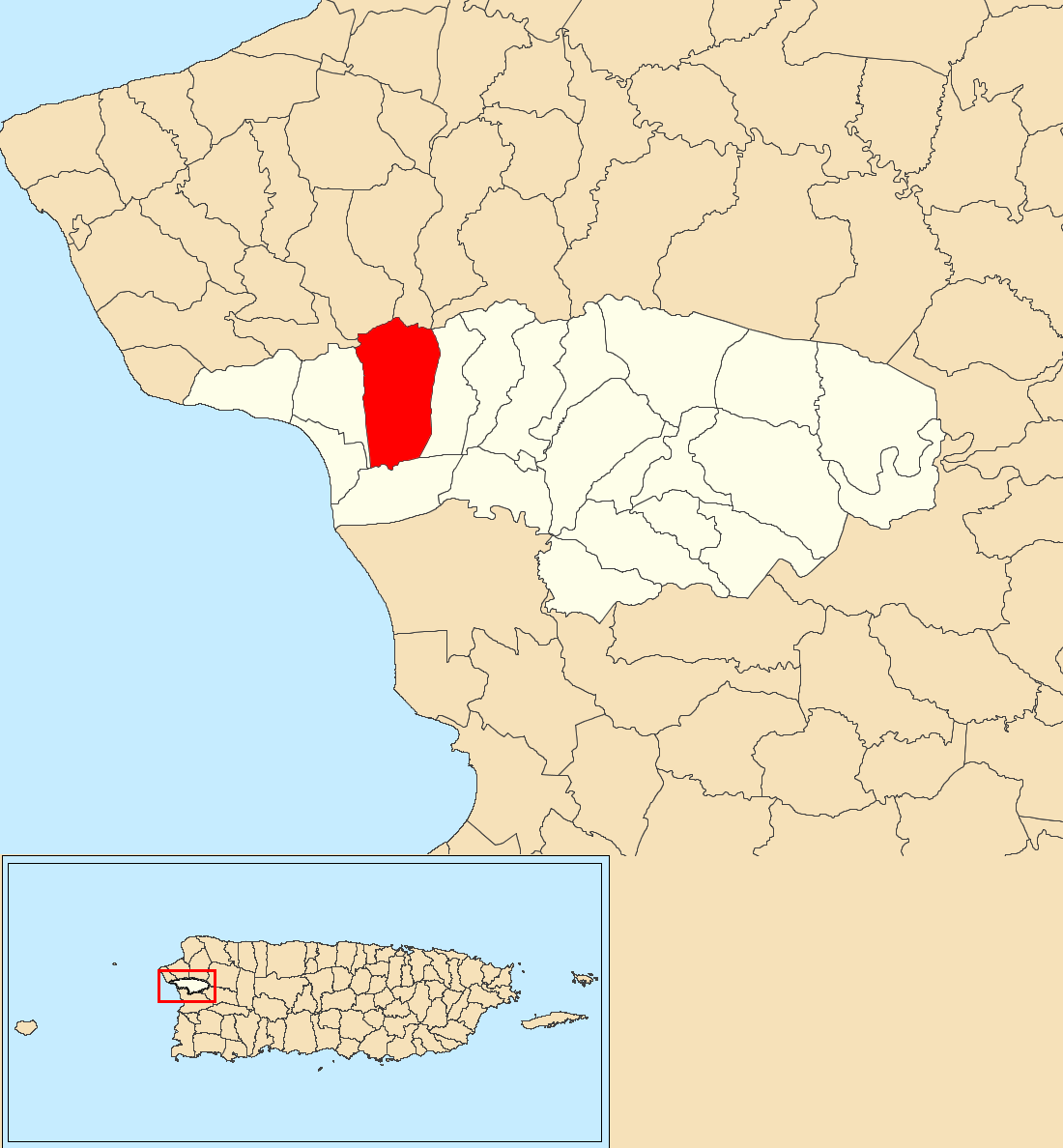
- Location of Piñales within the municipality of Añasco shown in red

- Location of Puerto Rico
- Coordinates: 18°18′01″N 67°10′22″W
- Commonwealth: Puerto Rico
- Municipality: Añasco

Area
  - Total: 2.54 sq mi (6.6 km^{2})
  - Land: 2.54 sq mi (6.6 km^{2})
  - Water: 0.00 sq mi (0 km^{2})
- Elevation: 66 ft (20 m)

Population (2010)
  - Total: 2,875
  - Density: 1,131.9/sq mi (437.0/km^{2})
- Source: 2010 Census
- Time zone: UTC−4 (AST)

Piñales is a barrio in the municipality of Añasco, Puerto Rico. Its population in 2010 was 2,875.

== History ==
Piñales was in Spain's gazetteers until Puerto Rico was ceded by Spain in the aftermath of the Spanish–American War under the terms of the Treaty of Paris of 1898 and became an unincorporated territory of the United States. In 1899, the United States Department of War conducted a census of Puerto Rico finding that the population of Piñales barrio was 1,038.

Piñales barrio became inaccessible when Hurricane Maria hit Puerto Rico on September 20, 2017 and caused landslides and destruction. Five months after the hurricane struck, engineers and officials were grappling with the massive amounts of repairs that were needed to PR-109 in Añasco and multiple other areas of this barrio and of Añasco, as a whole.

Historical population
Census	Pop.	Note	%±
1900	1,038		—
1910	1,090		5.0%
1920	1,051		−3.6%
1930	831		−20.9%
1940	1,044		25.6%
1950	1,108		6.1%
1960	1,492		34.7%
1970	1,847		23.8%
1980	1,685		−8.8%
1990	1,788		6.1%
2000	2,163		21.0%
2010	2,875		32.9%
U.S. Decennial Census; 1899 (shown as 1900) 1910-1930; 1930-1950 1980-2000 2010

== Sectors ==
Barrios (which are, in contemporary times, roughly comparable to minor civil divisions) in turn are further subdivided into smaller local populated place areas/units called sectores (sectors in English). The types of sectores may vary, from normally sector to urbanización to reparto to barriada to residencial, among others.

The following sectors are in Piñales barrio:

Piñales Tino Matías, Sector Cuesta Juan Vega, Sector Hacienda Libertad, Sector La Choza, Sector Piñales Abajo, Sector Piñales Arriba, Urbanización Mansiones de Añasco, Urbanización Paseo del Valle, and Urbanización Valle de Añasco.

== See also ==
- List of communities in Puerto Rico
- List of barrios and sectors of Añasco, Puerto Rico
