= Añasco Arriba, Añasco, Puerto Rico =

Barrio of Puerto Rico

Añasco Arriba
- Barrio
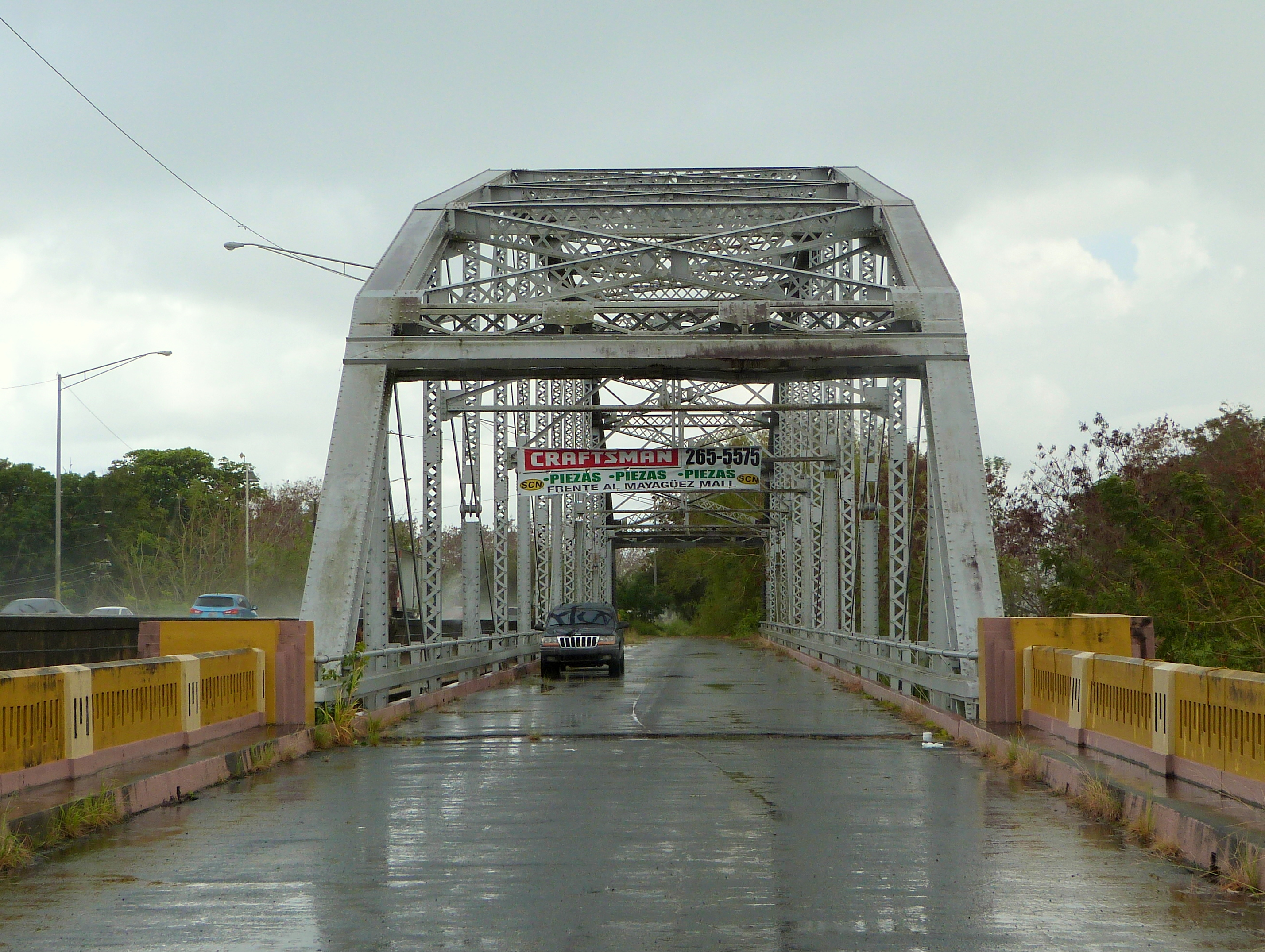
- Puente de Añasco

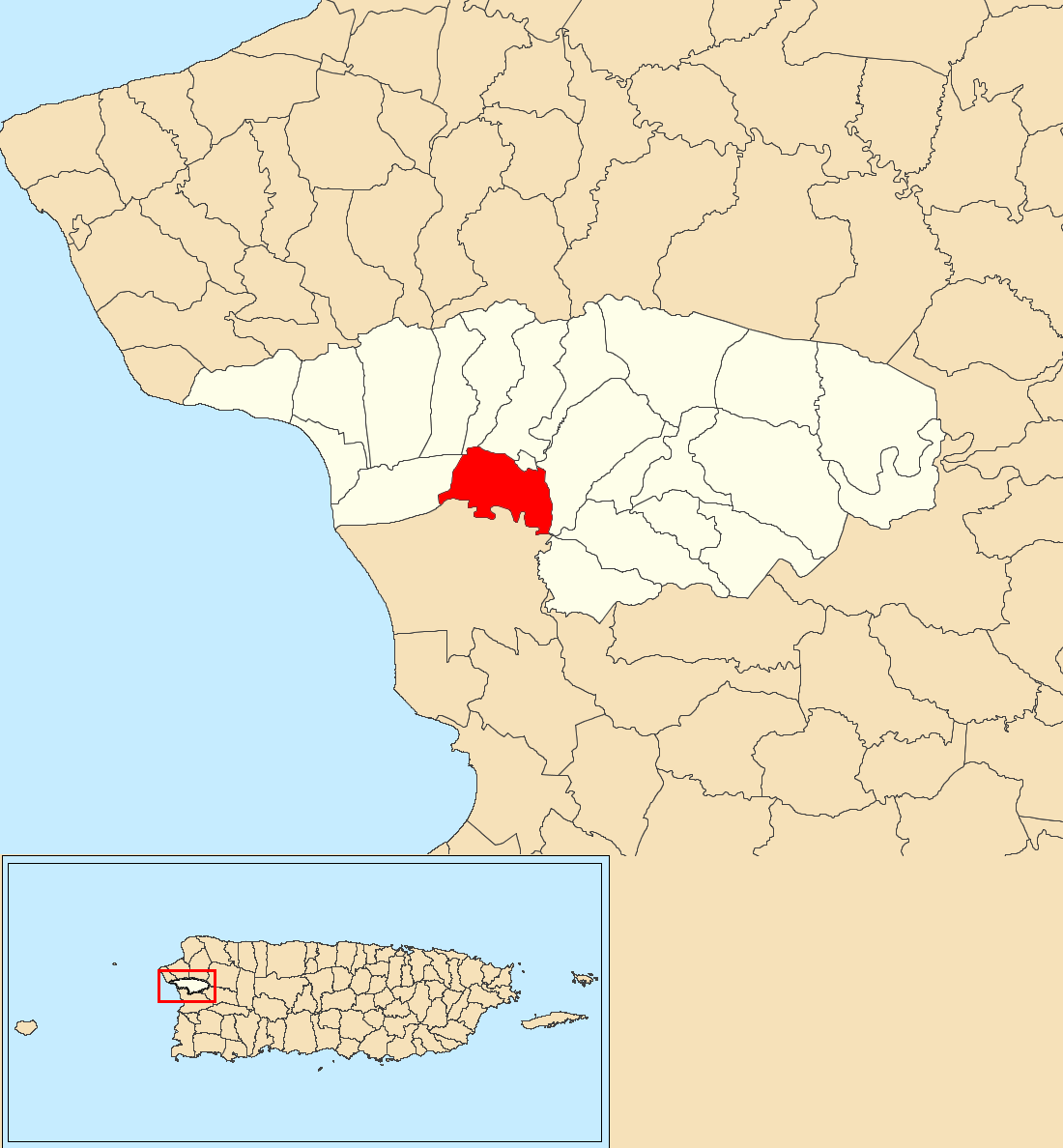
- Location of Añasco Arriba within the municipality of Añasco shown in red

- Location of Puerto Rico
- Coordinates: 18°16′34″N 67°08′48″W
- Commonwealth: Puerto Rico
- Municipality: Añasco

Area
  - Total: 1.56 sq mi (4.0 km^{2})
  - Land: 1.52 sq mi (3.9 km^{2})
  - Water: 0.04 sq mi (0.10 km^{2})
- Elevation: 30 ft (9.1 m)

Population (2010)
  - Total: 1,570
  - Density: 1,026.1/sq mi (396.2/km^{2})
- Source: 2010 Census
- Time zone: UTC−4 (AST)

Añasco Arriba Barrio is a barrio in the municipality of Añasco, Puerto Rico. Its population in 2010 was 1,570.

== History ==
Añasco Arriba was in Spain's gazetteers until Puerto Rico was ceded by Spain in the aftermath of the Spanish–American War under the terms of the Treaty of Paris of 1898 and became an unincorporated territory of the United States. In 1899, the United States Department of War conducted a census of Puerto Rico finding that the combined population of Añasco Arriba and Añasco Abajo barrios was 1,027.

Historical population
Census	Pop.	Note	%±
1910	791		—
1920	766		−3.2%
1930	610		−20.4%
1940	821		34.6%
1950	1,158		41.0%
1960	1,126		−2.8%
1970	0		−100.0%
1980	1,615		—
1990	1,868		15.7%
2000	1,847		−1.1%
2010	1,570		−15.0%
U.S. Decennial Census; 1900 (N/A) 1910-1930; 1930-1950 1980-2000 2010

== Sectors ==
Barrios (which are, in contemporary times, roughly comparable to minor civil divisions) in turn are further subdivided into smaller local populated place areas/units called sectores (sectors in English). The types of sectores may vary, from normally sector to urbanización to reparto to barriada to residencial, among others.

The following sectors are in Añasco Arriba barrio:

Carretera 109, Extensión Brisas de Añasco, Jardines de Añasco, Sector Nicolás Soto Ramos, Urbanización Brisas de Añasco, and Urbanización Sixto Nieto.

== See also ==
- List of communities in Puerto Rico
- List of barrios and sectors of Añasco, Puerto Rico
