= Cerro Gordo, Añasco, Puerto Rico =

Barrio of Puerto Rico

Cerro Gordo
- Barrio
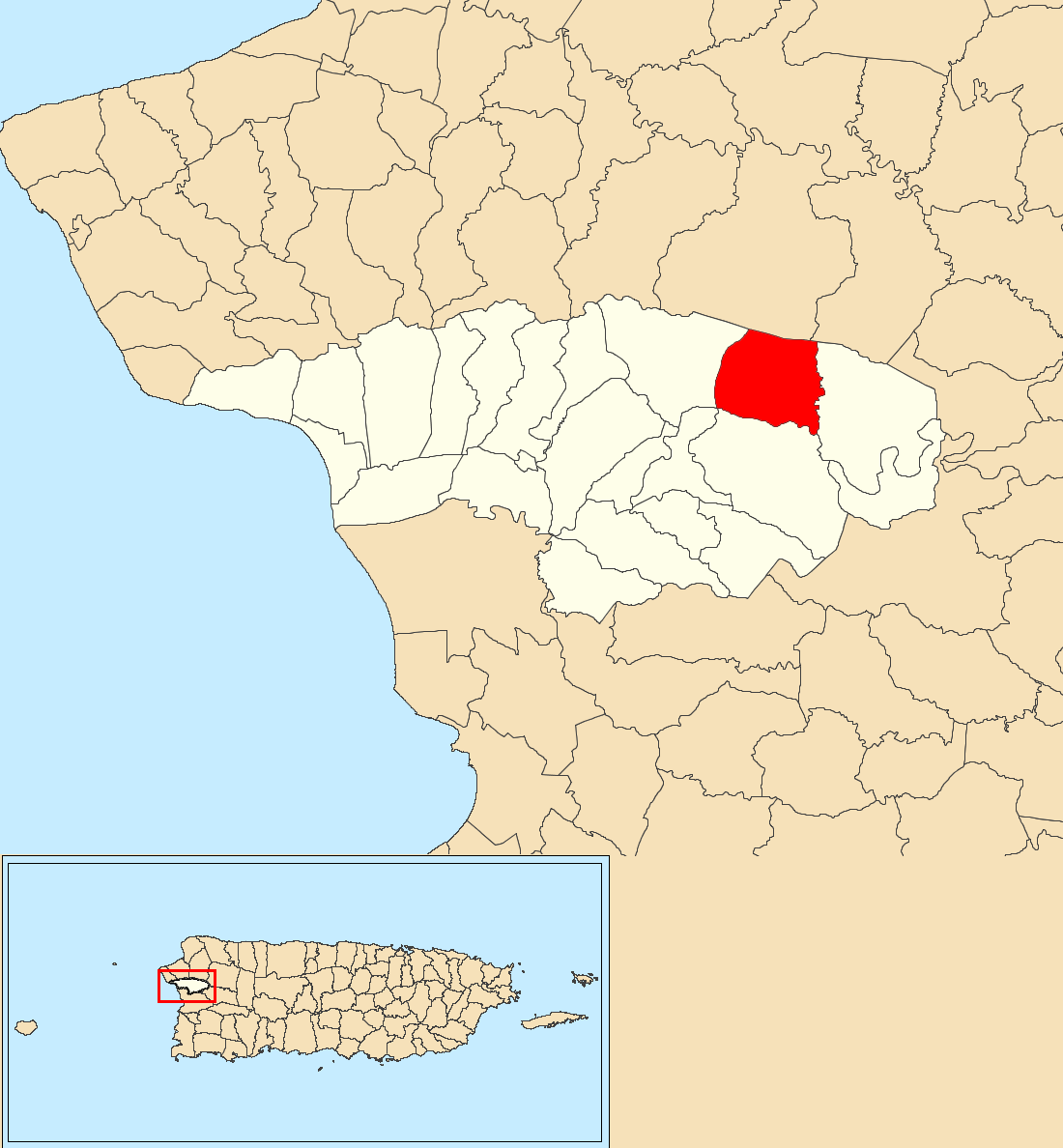
- Location of Cerro Gordo within the municipality of Añasco shown in red

- Location of Puerto Rico
- Coordinates: 18°18′10″N 67°04′52″W
- Commonwealth: Puerto Rico
- Municipality: Añasco

Area
  - Total: 2.27 sq mi (5.9 km^{2})
  - Land: 2.27 sq mi (5.9 km^{2})
  - Water: 0.00 sq mi (0 km^{2})
- Elevation: 768 ft (234 m)

Population (2010)
  - Total: 497
  - Density: 218.9/sq mi (84.5/km^{2})
- Source: 2010 Census
- Time zone: UTC−4 (AST)

Cerro Gordo is a barrio in the municipality of Añasco, Puerto Rico. Its population in 2010 was 497.

== History ==
Cerro Gordo was in Spain's gazetteers until Puerto Rico was ceded by Spain in the aftermath of the Spanish–American War under the terms of the Treaty of Paris of 1898 and became an unincorporated territory of the United States. In 1899, the United States Department of War conducted a census of Puerto Rico finding that the combined population of Cerro Gordo and Corcovada barrios was 1,159.

Historical population
Census	Pop.	Note	%±
1910	785		—
1920	721		−8.2%
1930	488		−32.3%
1940	571		17.0%
1950	536		−6.1%
1960	503		−6.2%
1970	367		−27.0%
1980	414		12.8%
1990	402		−2.9%
2000	411		2.2%
2010	497		20.9%
U.S. Decennial Census; 1900 (N/A) 1910-1930; 1930-1950 1980-2000 2010

== Sectors ==
Barrios (which are, in contemporary times, roughly comparable to minor civil divisions) in turn are further subdivided into smaller local populated place areas/units called sectores (sectors in English). The types of sectores may vary, from normally sector to urbanización to reparto to barriada to residencial, among others.

The following sectors are in Cerro Gordo barrio:

Camino Los Tres Reyes Magos, and Carretera 405.

== A "Special Community" ==
In 2014, Cerro Gordo was one of the 742 places on the list of "Special Communities of Puerto Rico" Comunidades Especiales de Puerto Rico.

== See also ==
- List of communities in Puerto Rico
- List of barrios and sectors of Añasco, Puerto Rico
