= Añasco, Puerto Rico =

Town and municipality in Puerto Rico

Añasco Municipio Autónomo de Añasco
- City and municipality
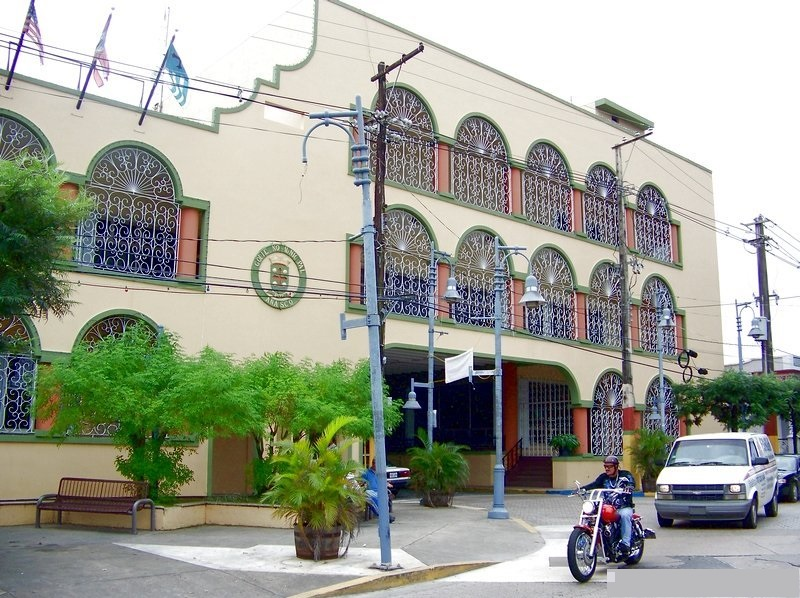
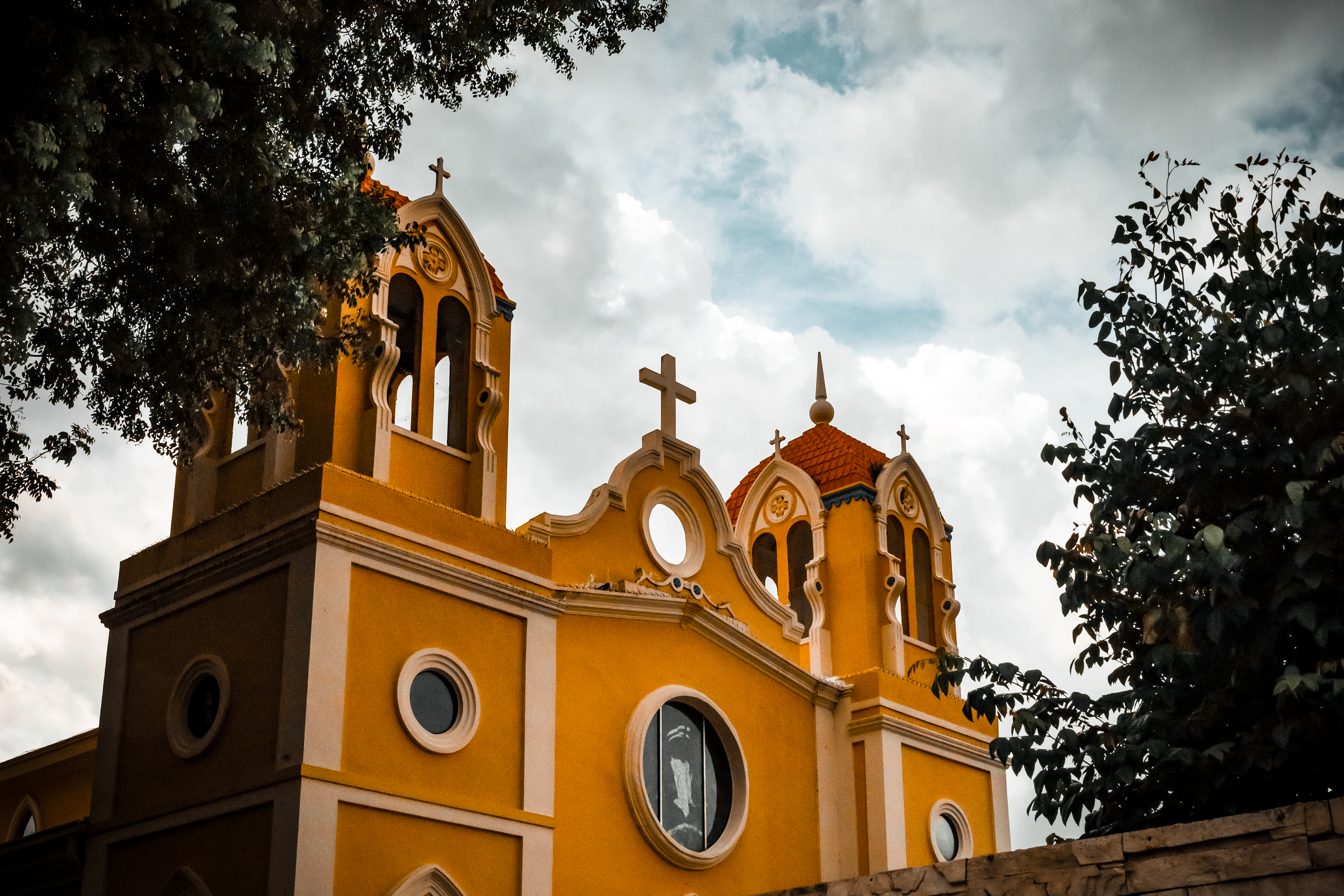
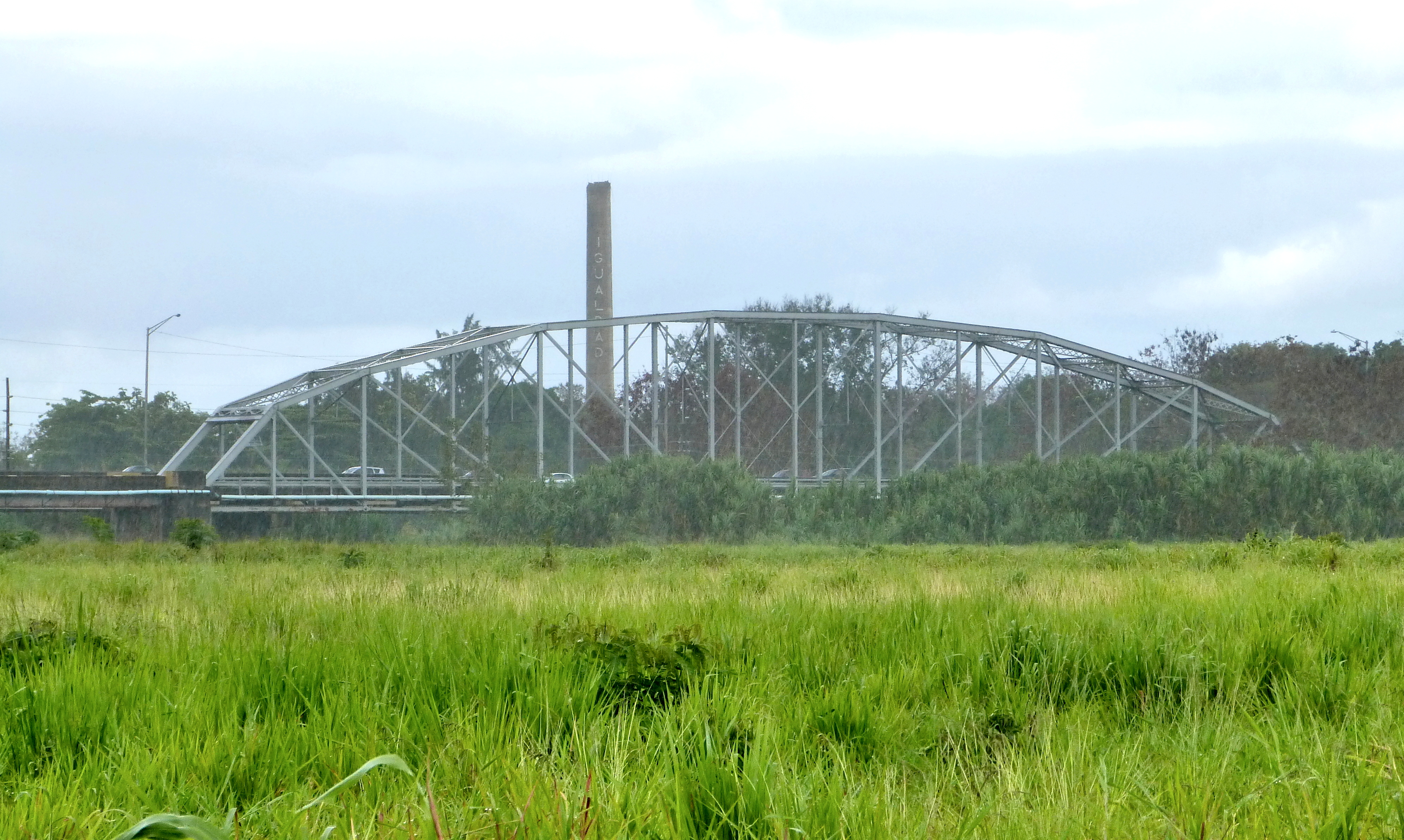
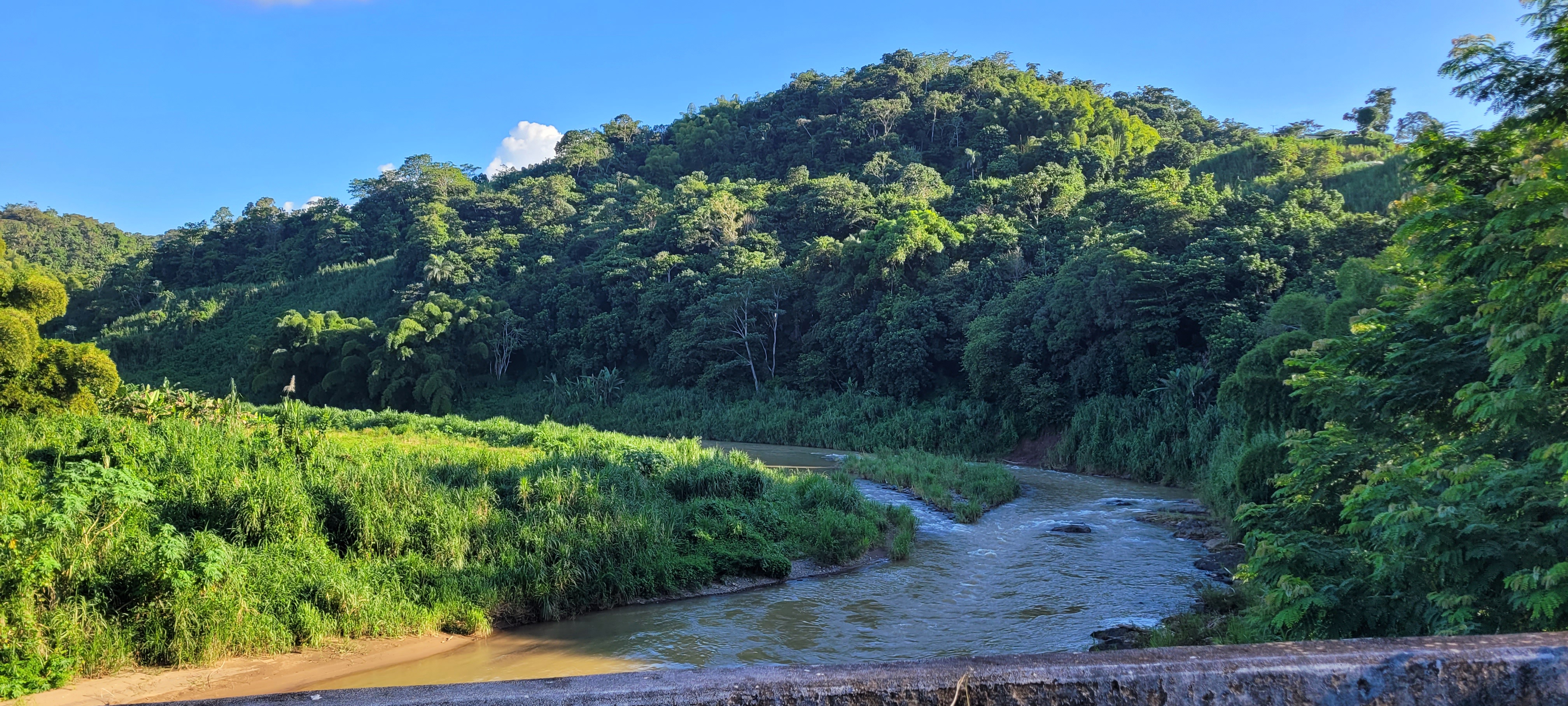
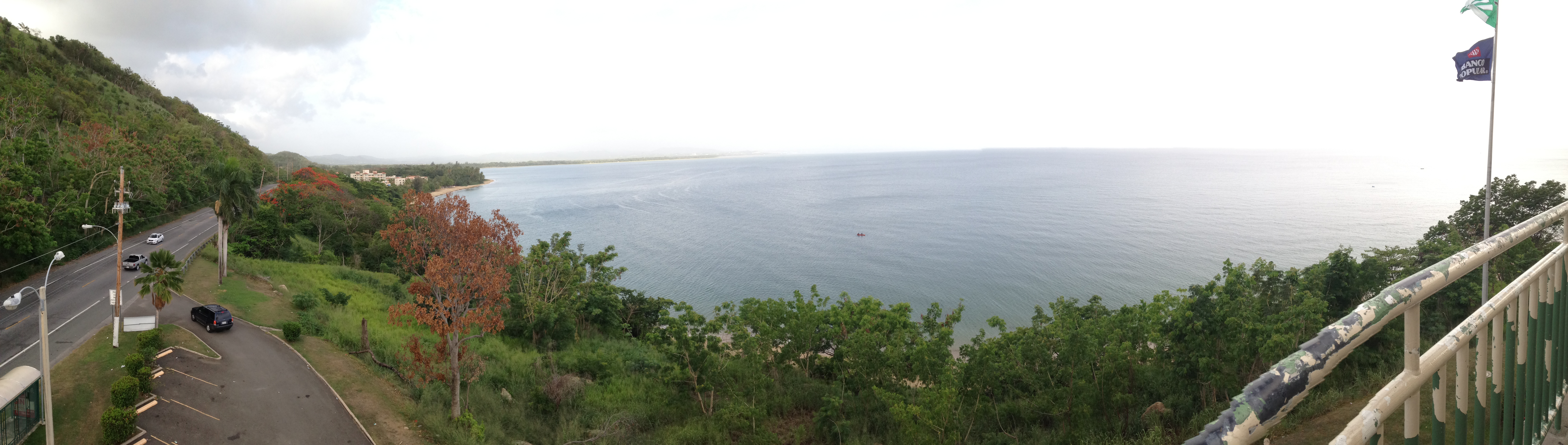
- Añasco; City Hall San Antonio Abad Church Salcedo Bridge Añasco River Añasco Bay

- Flag Coat of arms
- Nicknames: "La Ciudad Donde los Dioses Murieron", "El Pueblo Del Hojaldre", "El Pueblo de los Morcilleros", "Los nativos", "La Cuna de la Puertorriqueñidad"
- Anthem: "Añasco pueblo querido..."
- Map of Puerto Rico highlighting Añasco Municipality
- Coordinates: 18°18′58″N 67°08′23″W
- Sovereign state: United States
- Commonwealth: Puerto Rico
- First settled: 1508
- Founded: October 18, 1733
- Founder: Don Luis de Añasco
- Barrios: 23 barrios: Añasco Abajo; Añasco Arriba; Añasco barrio-pueblo; Caguabo; Caracol; Carreras; Casey Abajo; Casey Arriba; Cerro Gordo; Cidra; Corcovada; Dagüey; Espino; Hatillo; Humatas; Marías; Miraflores; Ovejas; Piñales; Playa; Quebrada Larga; Río Arriba; Río Cañas

Government
  - Mayor: Kabir Solares García (PNP)
  - Senatorial dist.: 4 - Mayagüez
  - Representative dist.: 18

Area
  - Total: 35.5 sq mi (92 km^{2})

Population (2020)
  - Total: 25,596
  - Estimate (2025): 24,449 ▼
  - Rank: 47th in Puerto Rico
  - Density: 721/sq mi (278/km^{2})
- Demonym: Añasqueños
- Time zone: UTC−4 (AST)
- ZIP Code: 00610
- Area code: 787/939
- Website: www.anascopr.net

Añasco (Spanish pronunciation: [aˈɲasko], locally [aˈɲaʔko]), named after one of its settlers, Don Luis de Añasco, is a town and municipality of Puerto Rico located on the west coast of the island bordering the Mona Passage to the west, north of Mayagüez, and Las Marias; south of Rincón, Aguada, and Moca and west of San Sebastián and Las Marias. It is part of the Aguadilla-Isabela-San Sebastián Metropolitan Statistical Area.

== Etymology and nicknames ==
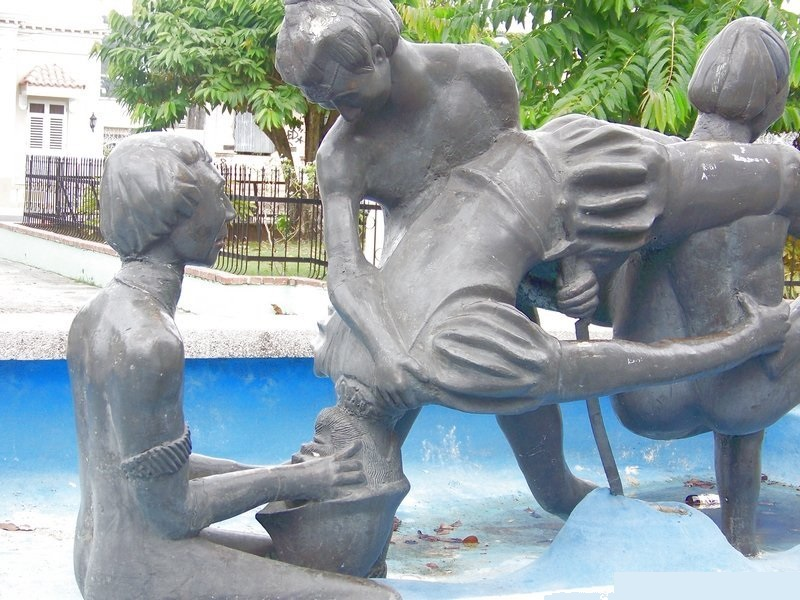
Statue in the main plaza's fountain depicting the drowning of legendary conquistador Diego Salcedo, a story which gives the municipality one of its many nicknames

The name Añasco comes from Don Luis de Añasco, former owner of the land where the town and municipality were founded. This family name is of Spanish origin from the province of Extremadura.

Some of the municipality's nicknames include: La ciudad donde los dioses mueren ("The city where gods die") and Los nativos ("the natives") are a reference to the legend of Spanish conquistador Diego Salcedo, who according to the story was drowned by the indigenous Taíno in order to prove that the European colonizers were not immortal deities; and Pueblo del Hojaldre ("Puff Pastry Town") after the hojaldre, a type of puff pastry the municipality is famous for.

== History ==
Although the Bahía de Aguada (Aguada Bay) in the neighboring town of Aguada, commonly known as the Ciudad del Descubrimiento (City of the Discovery), has historically been recognized as the location where Christopher Columbus first landed in Puerto Rico during his second voyage on 19 November 1493, it is believed by most historians that Bahía de Añasco (Añasco Bay) near the mouth of the Río Grande de Añasco in Añasco was the place of Columbus’ first landing and stay of two days in Puerto Rico before continuing to La Navidad, first European settlement in the Americas, in Haiti in Hispaniola.

The town of Añasco was founded on October 18, 1733, and named after Don Luis de Añasco, a colonist from the Extremadura region of Spain who came to Puerto Rico with Juan Ponce de León. Añasco was founded by the initiative of rich landowner Don José de Santiago, who wanted to establish the villa in properties owned by Don Luis de Añasco. The property was located on the margins of the río Guaorabo, as the Taínos called it.

Añasco town was preceded by the first original location of the settlement of San Germán. This settlement was attacked and destroyed several times by the Taínos and pirates before moving to the current location. In November 1511, Juan Ponce de León handed over governorship to Juan Cerón, a lieutenant of the viceroy Diego Colon (son of Cristobal Colon or Cristopher Columbus). Cerón ordered Miguel de Toro, a lieutenant of Juan Ponce de León, to create a "Christian Village" in western Borinquen, calling it San Germán. This was the second attempt of foundation given in 1511 at the mouth of the Guaorabo River (present day Rio Añasco), near the area known today as Añasco, Puerto Rico. This first settlement was attacked in 1528, 1538, and again in 1554. A fort to protect this town began in 1540, but its construction was suspended in 1546 when the people decided to move inland being tired of attacks. Attacks by Carib Indians forced the population to move south inland to the present site of the present town of San Germán.

The Añasco River is also claimed to be the site of the popular legend of the drowning of the Spaniard Diego Salcedo in 1511 at the hands of the Taínos, proving the Spanish soldiers were not gods and igniting a revolt. It is believed that the revolt was led by the cacique "Cacique Chayoán" (Uruyoán) and suppressed by Spanish soldiers.

Many of the first settlers to the area came from the Canary Islands and the south of Spain. The 1918 San Fermín earthquake destroyed Añasco's parish church, the town hall and other buildings, almost eliminating most of the historic downtown structures.

Hurricane Maria on September 20, 2017, triggered numerous landslides in Añasco. In some areas of Añasco there were more than 25 landslides per square mile due to the significant amount of rainfall. Barrio Playa was particularly affected with about 96% of the homes under water. Bridges in and around Añasco sustained extensive damage as a result of Hurricane Maria.

== Geography ==
Añasco is located in the Coastal Plains of the west, bordered by the Río Grande de Añasco. It is bordered in the north by Rincón, Aguada, and Moca; Mayagüez to the south; and San Sebastián and Las Marías to the east. The Mona Passage lies to the west of the town. The Añasco terrain is mostly plain but features a series of hills and mountains like Canta Gallo (1,194 feet, or 364 meters), Gordo and Pichón (both at 1,115 feet, or 340 meters). It is also crossed by several rivers like Icaco River, Caguabo River, La Balsa, and others.

=== Barrios ===
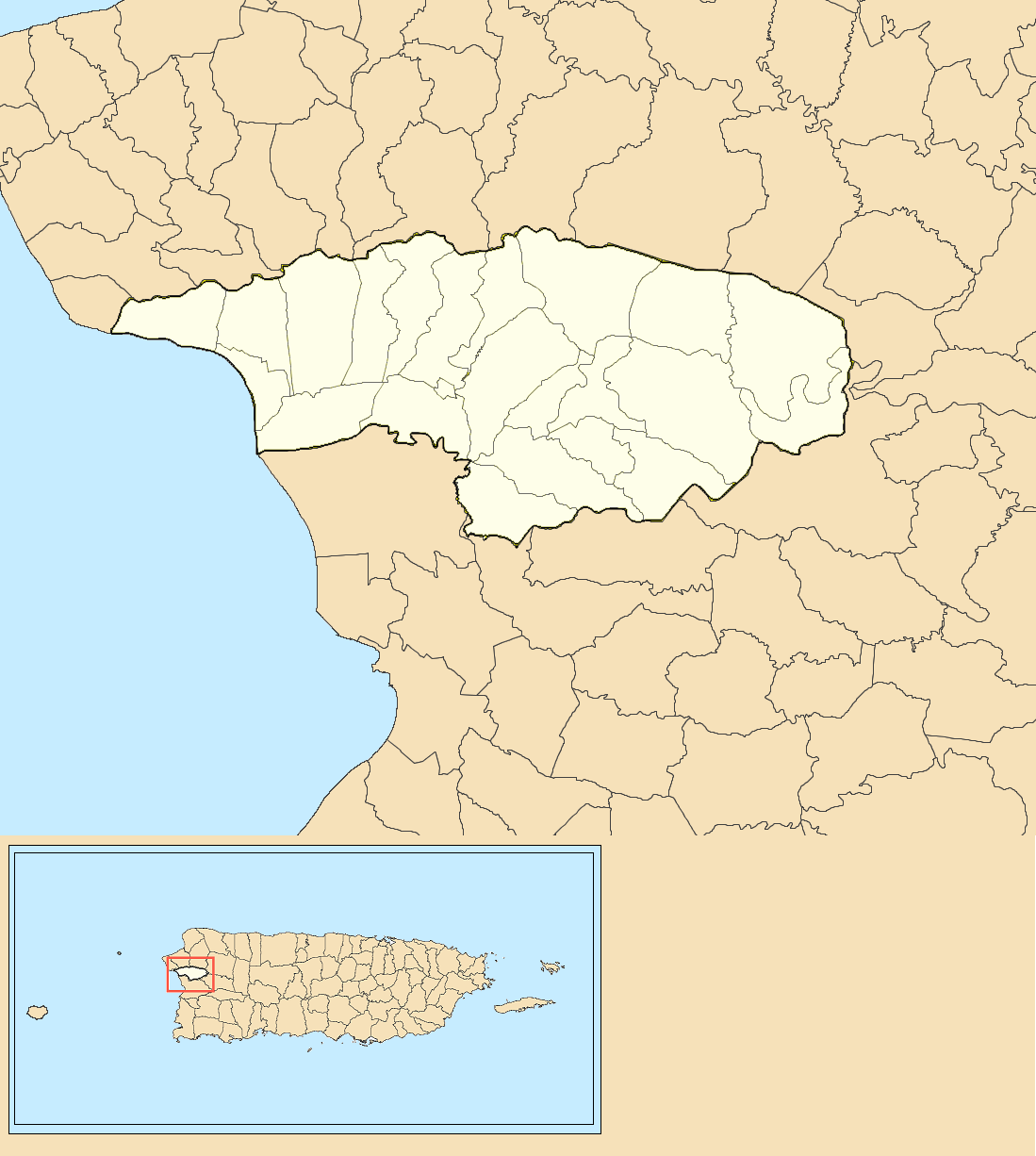
Subdivisions of Añasco.

Like all municipalities of Puerto Rico, Añasco is subdivided into barrios. The municipal buildings, central square and large Catholic church are located in a small barrio referred to as "el pueblo", near the center of the municipality.

1. Añasco Abajo
2. Añasco Arriba
3. Añasco barrio-pueblo
4. Caguabo
5. Caracol
6. Carreras
7. Casey Abajo
8. Casey Arriba
9. Cerro Gordo
10. Cidra
11. Corcovada
12. Dagüey
13. Espino
14. Hatillo
15. Humatas
16. Marías
17. Miraflores
18. Ovejas
19. Piñales
20. Playa
21. Quebrada Larga
22. Río Arriba
23. Río Cañas

=== Sectors ===
Barrios (which are like minor civil divisions) in turn are further subdivided into smaller local populated place areas/units called sectores (sectors in English). The types of sectores may vary, from normally sector to urbanización to reparto to barriada to residencial, among others.

=== Special Communities ===
Comunidades Especiales de Puerto Rico (Special Communities of Puerto Rico) are marginalized communities whose citizens are experiencing a certain amount of social exclusion. A map shows these communities occur in nearly every municipality of the commonwealth. Of the 742 places that were on the list in 2014, the following barrios, communities, sectors, or neighborhoods were in Añasco: Cerro Gordo, Corcovada, Hatillo, Miraflores, and Caguabo barrios, Comunidad La Playa, Parcelas Josefa (Comunidad Espino), Parcelas Marías, Piñales (La Choza), and Zumbadora sector in Río Arriba barrio.

== Demographics ==
Like most of the people of Puerto Rico, the Añasco population originated with the Taino Indians and then by immigrants from Spain that settled the central highland, most prominently the Andalusian and Canarian Spanish migration who formed the bulk of the jibaro or white peasant stock of the island. The Andalusian and Canarian Spaniards also influenced much of the Puerto Rican culture which explains the Southern Spanish dialect, and the Spanish colonial architecture.

Puerto Rico was ceded by Spain in the aftermath of the Spanish–American War under the terms of the Treaty of Paris of 1898 and became a territory of the United States. In 1899, the United States conducted its first census of Puerto Rico finding that the population of Añasco was 13,311.

Historical population
| Census | Pop. | Note | %± |
|---|---|---|---|
| 1900 | 13,311 | | — |
| 1910 | 14,407 | | 8.2% |
| 1920 | 13,834 | | −4.0% |
| 1930 | 14,276 | | 3.2% |
| 1940 | 15,701 | | 10.0% |
| 1950 | 17,235 | | 9.8% |
| 1960 | 17,200 | | −0.2% |
| 1970 | 19,416 | | 12.9% |
| 1980 | 23,274 | | 19.9% |
| 1990 | 25,234 | | 8.4% |
| 2000 | 28,348 | | 12.3% |
| 2010 | 29,261 | | 3.2% |
| 2020 | 25,596 | | −12.5% |
| 2025 (est.) | 24,449 | ▼ | −4.5% |
U.S. Decennial Census; 1899 (shown as 1900) 1910-1930; 1930-1950 1960-2000 2010 2020

== Tourism ==
=== Landmarks and places of interest ===
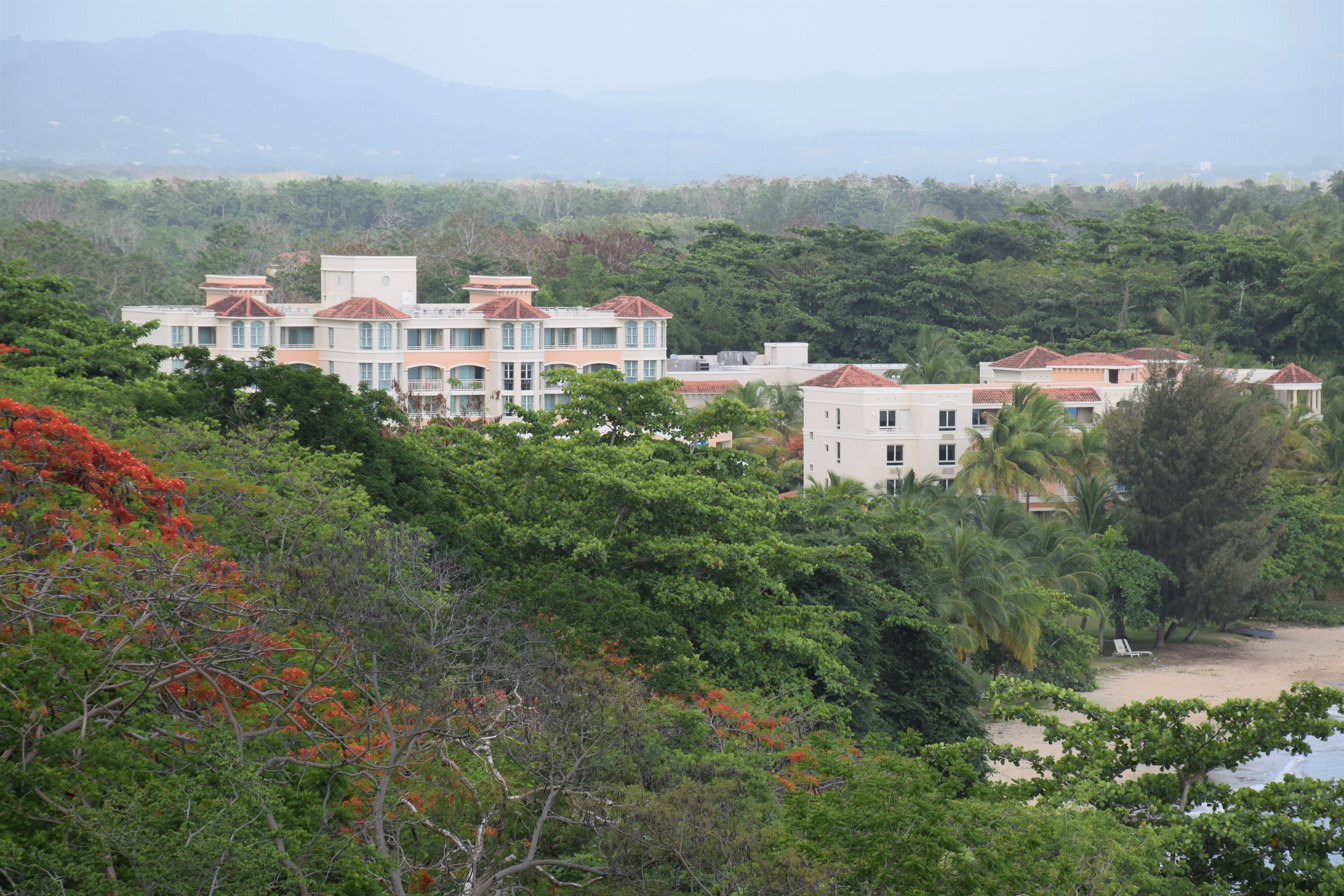
Resort in Caguabo

There are 18 beaches in Añasco. Tres Hermanos Beach is a well-known Añasco beach which remained closed for more than two years after Hurricane Maria destroyed it in September 2017. It was set to reopen in 2020 after many renovations which continued into February 2020.

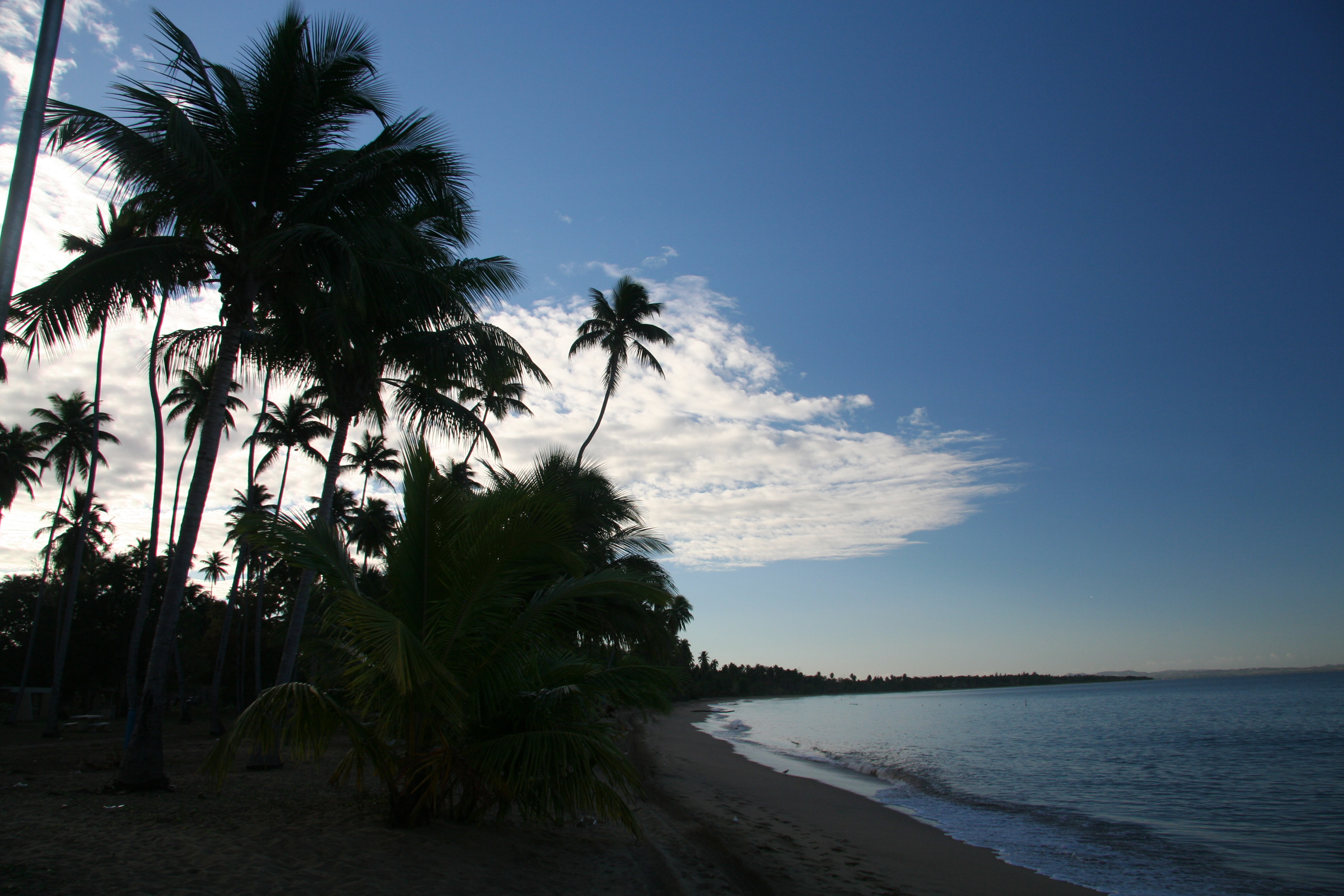
Playa de Tres Hermanos (Three Brothers Beach) in Añasco, Puerto Rico

Some other beaches and places of interest in Añasco include:

- Añasco Beach
- Autodrome
- El Salto de la Encantada
- Hacienda La Eugenia
- Río Grande de Añasco
- San Antonio Abad Parish Church
- Villa Pesquera

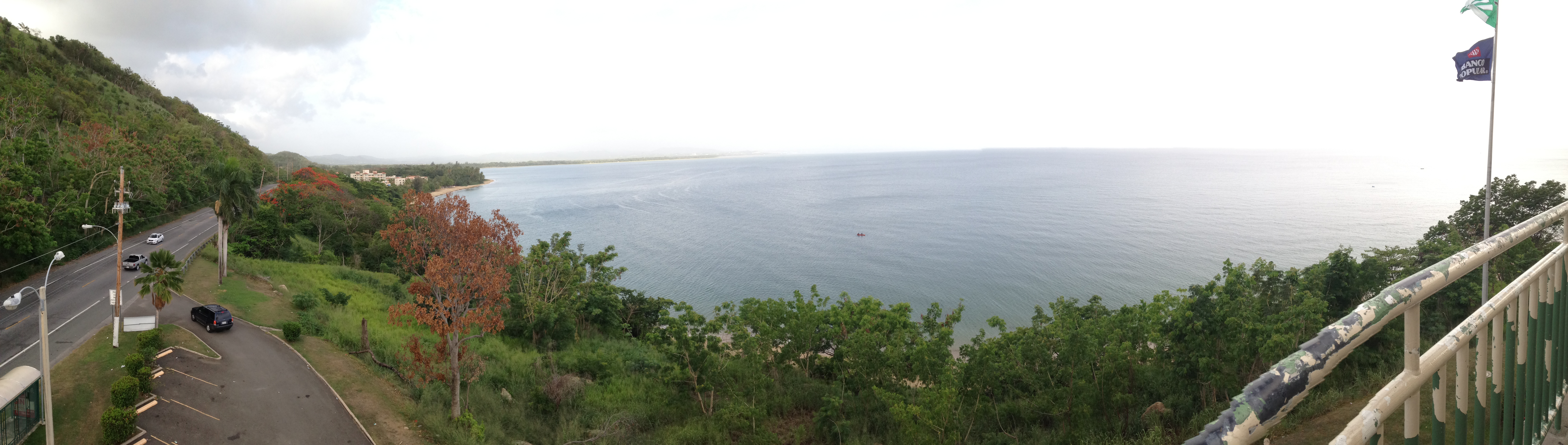
Mirador de la Bahía

To stimulate local tourism during the COVID-19 pandemic in Puerto Rico, the Puerto Rico Tourism Company launched the Voy Turistiendo (I'm Touring) campaign in 2021. The campaign featured a passport book with a page for each municipality. The Voy Turisteando Añasco passport page lists Casco Urbano, Mirador de la Bahía, and restaurants on Puerto Rico Highway 115 as places of interest.

== Culture ==
=== Festivals and events ===
Añasco celebrates its patron saint festival in January. The Fiestas Patronales de San Antonio Abad is a religious and cultural celebration that generally features parades, games, artisans, amusement rides, regional food, and live entertainment.

Other festivals and events celebrated in Añasco include:

- Mayuco Festival – January
- Fine Arts Festival (Festival de Bellas Artes – January
- Three Kings Day Festival in Ovejas and Corcovada barrios – January
- Saint Anthony's Marathon – January
- Antique Car Fair – January
- Theater Festival – May
- Youth Festival – July
- Festival in Honor of Saint Rose of Lima – August
- Añasco Triathlon – September
- Chipe Festival – October

=== Sports ===
Añasco has a AA baseball team called the Fundadores de Añasco. It is also known for being the hometown of some amateur boxing prospects like Samuel Figueroa.

== Notable people ==
- Mariana Bracetti - (1825–1903) was a revolutionary leader of the Puerto Rico independence movement in the 1860s. She is attributed with having knitted the flag that was intended to be used as the national emblem of Puerto Rico in its attempt to overthrow the Spanish government on the island, and to establish the island as a sovereign republic.
- Ivy Queen - Singer
- Aristides Gonzalez - boxer, Olympic bronze medalist in 1984
- Young Miko - rapper and singer-songwriter.

== Economy ==
In 2016 the municipal government reported a budget surplus of $1.3 million nonetheless the government also indicated that the municipal debt was $13 million.

=== Agriculture ===
Sugar cane had been cultivated in Añasco as early as the 16th century. The earliest known sugar mill ("ingenios") operator around the Añasco area was Tomás de Castellón in 1523. Añasco has also been a place for fruits and coffee cultivation.

== Government ==
All municipalities in Puerto Rico are administered by a mayor, elected every four years. The current mayor of Añasco is Kabir Solares García, of the New Progressive Party (PNP). He was first elected at the 2020 general elections.

The city belongs to the Puerto Rico Senatorial district IV, which is represented by two Senators. In 2024, Jeison Rosa and Karen Michelle Román Rodríguez, both from the New Progressive Party (PNP), were elected as District Senators.

== Transportation ==
There are 22 bridges in Añasco, and many sustained damages on September 20, 2017, when Hurricane Maria hit Puerto Rico.

== Education ==
The Puerto Rico Department of Education operates several public schools in the municipality, including two bilingual schools, Antonio Gonzalez Suarez Regional Bilingual Elementary School and Sergio Ramirez de Arellano-Hostos Regional Bilingual Secondary School, the first public bilingual schools on the island. There are also private bilingual schools in the municipality, such as Colegio de la Salle and MAS Integrated School.

== Symbols ==
The municipio has an official flag and coat of arms.

=== Flag ===
The flag colors, design and symbolism are taken from the Añasco's coat of arms, with the only exception the silver parts on the coat of arms are white on the flag.

=== Coat of arms ===
The green field of the shield contains a saber cross massed in black, outlined in silver, and has a gold scallop shell in each quadrant formed by a cross fleury. A gold mural crown of three towers crests the shield.

== See also ==
- History of Puerto Rico
- National Register of Historic Places listings in Añasco, Puerto Rico
