= Hatillo, Añasco, Puerto Rico =

Barrio of Puerto Rico

Hatillo
- Barrio
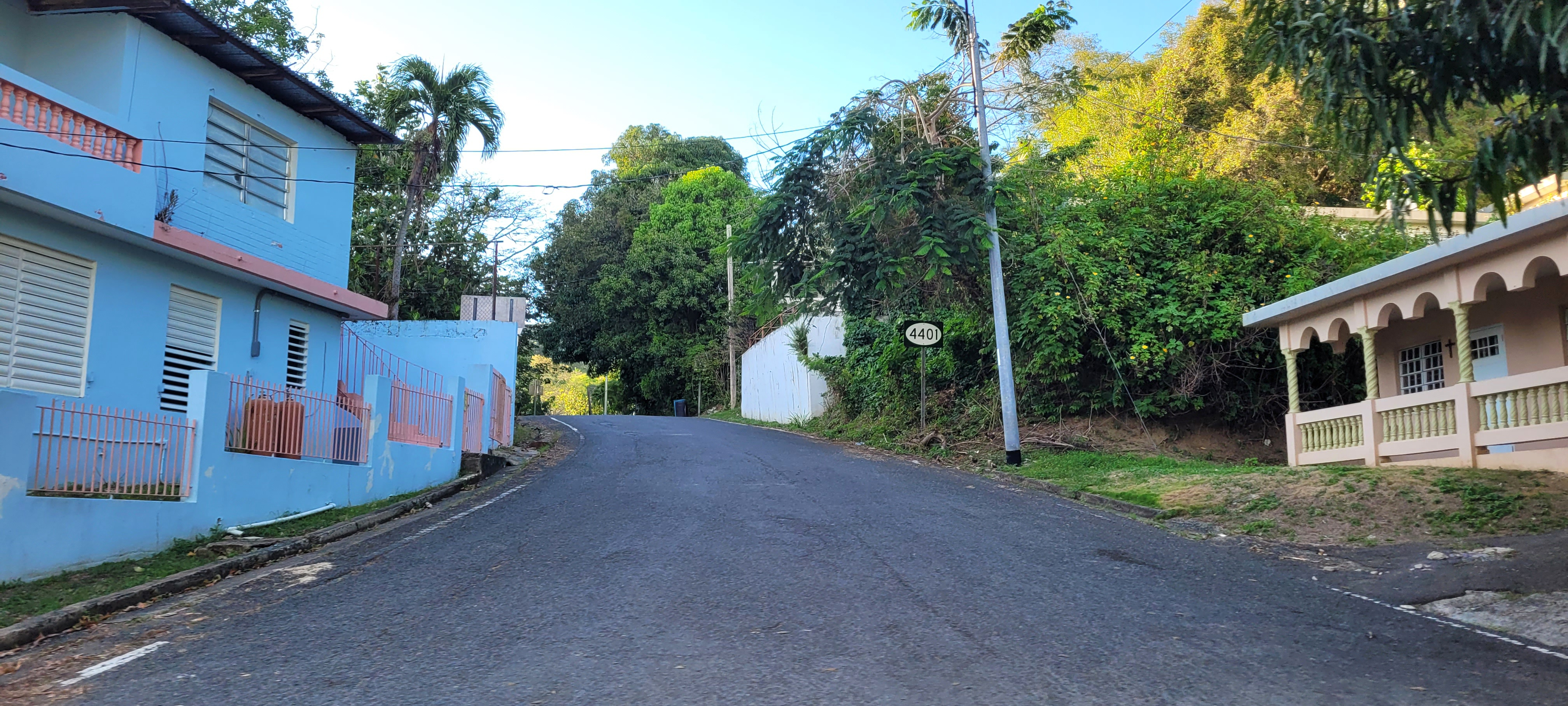
- Puerto Rico Highway 4401 in Hatillo

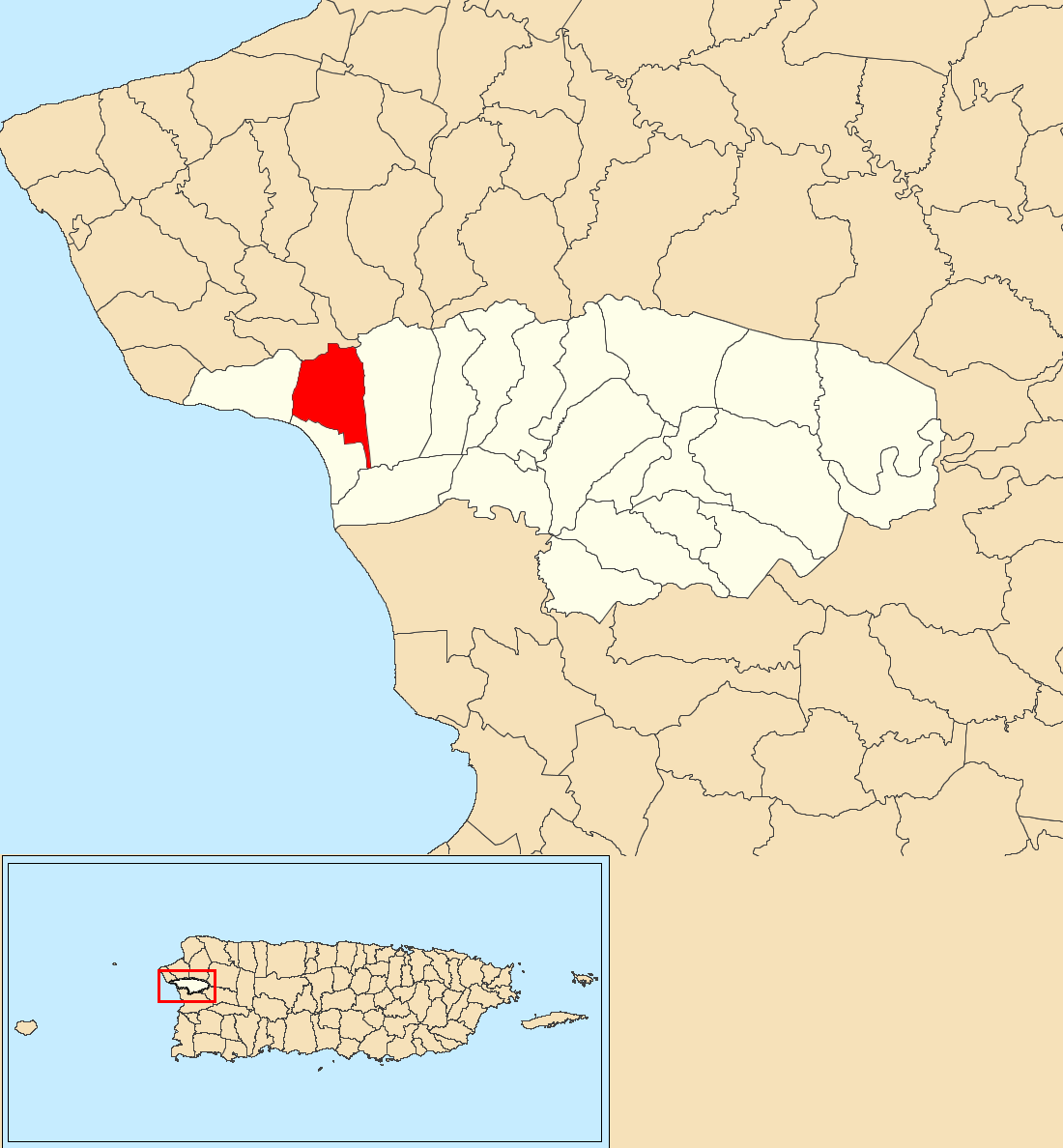
- Location of Hatillo within the municipality of Añasco shown in red

- Location of Puerto Rico
- Coordinates: 18°17′57″N 67°11′18″W
- Commonwealth: Puerto Rico
- Municipality: Añasco

Area
  - Total: 1.48 sq mi (3.8 km^{2})
  - Land: 1.48 sq mi (3.8 km^{2})
  - Water: 0.00 sq mi (0 km^{2})
- Elevation: 230 ft (70 m)

Population (2010)
  - Total: 1,269
  - Density: 857.4/sq mi (331.0/km^{2})
- Source: 2010 Census
- Time zone: UTC−4 (AST)

Hatillo is a barrio in the municipality of Añasco, Puerto Rico. Its population in 2010 was 1,269.

== History ==
Hatillo was in Spain's gazetteers until Puerto Rico was ceded by Spain in the aftermath of the Spanish–American War under the terms of the Treaty of Paris of 1898 and became an unincorporated territory of the United States. In 1899, the United States Department of War conducted a census of Puerto Rico finding that the combined population of Hatillo and Caracol barrios was 1,030.

Historical population
Census	Pop.	Note	%±
1910	578		—
1920	480		−17.0%
1930	738		53.8%
1940	710		−3.8%
1950	818		15.2%
1960	818		0.0%
1970	1,077		31.7%
1980	1,185		10.0%
1990	1,229		3.7%
2000	1,383		12.5%
2010	1,269		−8.2%
U.S. Decennial Census; 1900 (N/A) 1910-1930; 1930-1950 1980-2000 2010

== Sectors ==
Barrios (which are, in contemporary times, roughly comparable to minor civil divisions) in turn are further subdivided into smaller local populated place areas/units called sectores (sectors in English). The types of sectores may vary, from normally sector to urbanización to reparto to barriada to residencial, among others.

The following sectors are in Hatillo barrio:

Agrones, Edificio La Sirena, Goyo Carrero, Sector La Ferrer, Sector La Variante, and Sector Peyo Valentín.

== A "Special Community" ==
In 2014, Hatillo was one of the 742 places on the list of "Special Communities of Puerto Rico" Comunidades Especiales de Puerto Rico.

== See also ==
- List of communities in Puerto Rico
- List of barrios and sectors of Añasco, Puerto Rico
