= Puerto Rico Highway 108 =

Highway in Puerto Rico

Highway 108
- Ruta 108

Route information
- Maintained by Puerto Rico DTPW
- Length: 22.0 km (13.7 mi)

Major junctions
- South end: Calle Méndez Vigo in Mayagüez barrio-pueblo
- PR-65 in Miradero–Mayagüez barrio-pueblo; PR-3108 in Miradero; PR-351 in Miradero–Río Cañas Abajo; PR-342 in Río Cañas Abajo–Miradero; PR-430 in Leguísamo–Ovejas–Río Cañas; PR-4430 in Leguísamo–Casey Arriba–Ovejas; PR-352 in Leguísamo; PR-354 in Leguísamo; PR-406 in Anones; PR-4406 in Anones
- North end: PR-109 in Corcovada

Location
- Country: United States
- Territory: Puerto Rico
- Municipalities: Mayagüez, Las Marías, Añasco

Highway system
- Roads in Puerto Rico; List
← PR-107	→ PR-109
← PR-3101	PR-3108	→ PR-3116

Puerto Rico Highway 108 (PR-108) is a road that travels from Mayagüez, Puerto Rico to Añasco. It begins at its intersection with PR-105 (Calle de la Candelaria) in downtown Mayagüez and ends at its junction with PR-109 in eastern Añasco, near Las Marías and San Sebastián. Near this road is located the Mayagüez Zoo.

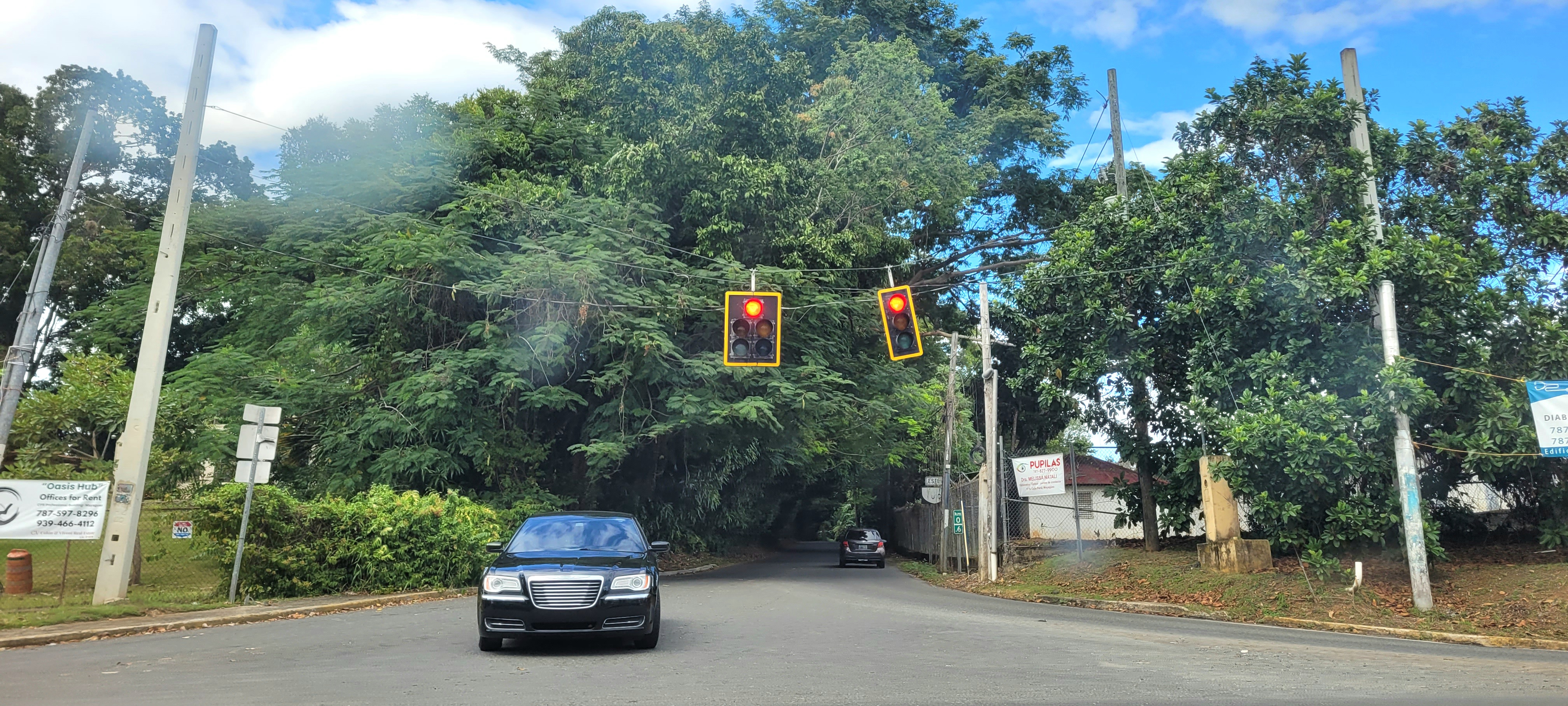
PR-108 east at PR-65 junction between Mayagüez barrio-pueblo and Miradero

== Major intersections ==
Municipality	Location	km	mi	Destinations	Notes
Mayagüez	Mayagüez barrio-pueblo	0.0	0.0	PR-Calle Méndez Vigo – Mayagüez	Southern terminus of PR-108
Mayagüez	Miradero–Mayagüez barrio-pueblo line	0.6	0.37	PR-65 (Avenida Pedro Albizu Campos) – Las Marías, Ponce	
Mayagüez	Miradero	2.8	1.7	PR-3108 west (Paseo Juan Mari Brás) – Añasco	
Mayagüez	Miradero–Río Cañas Abajo line	4.1	2.5	PR-351 – Mayagüez Arriba	
Mayagüez	Miradero–Río Cañas Abajo line	4.5	2.8	PR-342 – Sabanetas	
Mayagüez–Añasco municipal line	Leguísamo–Ovejas– Río Cañas tripoint	8.8– 8.9	5.5– 5.5	PR-430 – Ovejas	
Mayagüez–Añasco municipal line	Leguísamo–Casey Arriba– Ovejas tripoint	10.9	6.8	PR-4430 – Ovejas	
Mayagüez	Leguísamo	12.3– 12.4	7.6– 7.7	PR-352 – Leguísamo	
Mayagüez	Leguísamo	12.4– 12.5	7.7– 7.8	PR-354 – Río Cañas Arriba	
Las Marías	Anones	15.9	9.9	PR-406 – Cidra	
Las Marías	Anones	18.9	11.7	PR-4406 east – Las Marías	
Añasco	Corcovada	22.0	13.7	PR-109 – Añasco, San Sebastián	Northern terminus of PR-108
1.000 mi = 1.609 km; 1.000 km = 0.621 mi

== Related route ==
Highway 3108
- Location: Mayagüez
- Length: 1.5 km (0.93 mi)

Puerto Rico Highway 3108 (PR-3108) is a bypass road that branches off from PR-108 and ends at PR-2 north of the University of Puerto Rico at Mayagüez. This highway was officially designated as Paseo Juan Mari Brás. The entire route is located in Mayagüez.

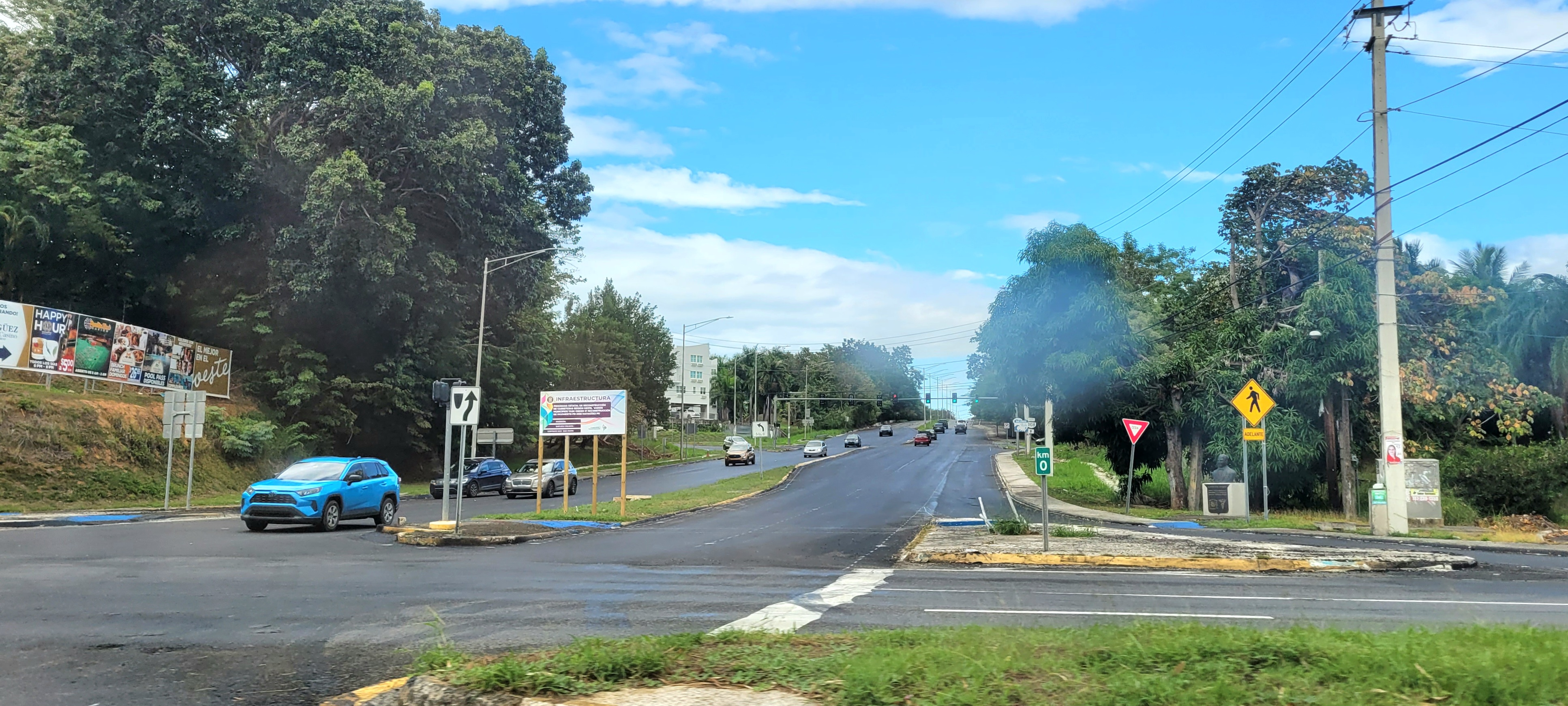
Eastbound beginning of PR-3108 between Mayagüez barrio-pueblo and Miradero, leaving PR-2 junction

Location	km	mi	Destinations	Notes
Miradero–Mayagüez barrio-pueblo line	0.0	0.0	PR-2 – Hormigueros, Añasco	Western terminus of PR-3108
Miradero	0.1– 0.2	0.062– 0.12	PR-104 (Carretera Dr. Victoriano Quintana Muñiz) – Algarrobos	
Miradero	1.5	0.93	PR-108 (Carretera Profesor Ángel A. Gaud González) – Mayagüez, Miradero	Eastern terminus of PR-3108
1.000 mi = 1.609 km; 1.000 km = 0.621 mi
