= Puerto Rico Highway 65 =

Highway in Puerto Rico

Highway 65
- Ruta 65
- Avenida Pedro Albizu Campos

Route information
- Maintained by Puerto Rico DTPW
- Length: 0.92 km (0.57 mi; 3,000 ft)

Major junctions
- West end: PR-239 in Mayagüez barrio-pueblo
- PR-108 in Mayagüez barrio-pueblo–Miradero
- East end: PR-106 in Mayagüez barrio-pueblo

Location
- Country: United States
- Territory: Puerto Rico
- Municipalities: Mayagüez

Highway system
- Roads in Puerto Rico; List
← PR-64	→ PR-66

Puerto Rico Highway 65 (PR-65) is a short highway connecting Puerto Rico Highway PR-239, also locally known as Alfonso Valdés Cobián Boulevard (formerly known as Calle Post and PR-2R) near University of Puerto Rico at Mayagüez, to Puerto Rico Highway 106. It has not an intersection to the main highway PR-2, but can be accessed quickly going west of the alt route. It is also the main highway to the Palacio de Recreación y Deportes (Sports and Recreation Palace) and to the Parque de los Próceres.

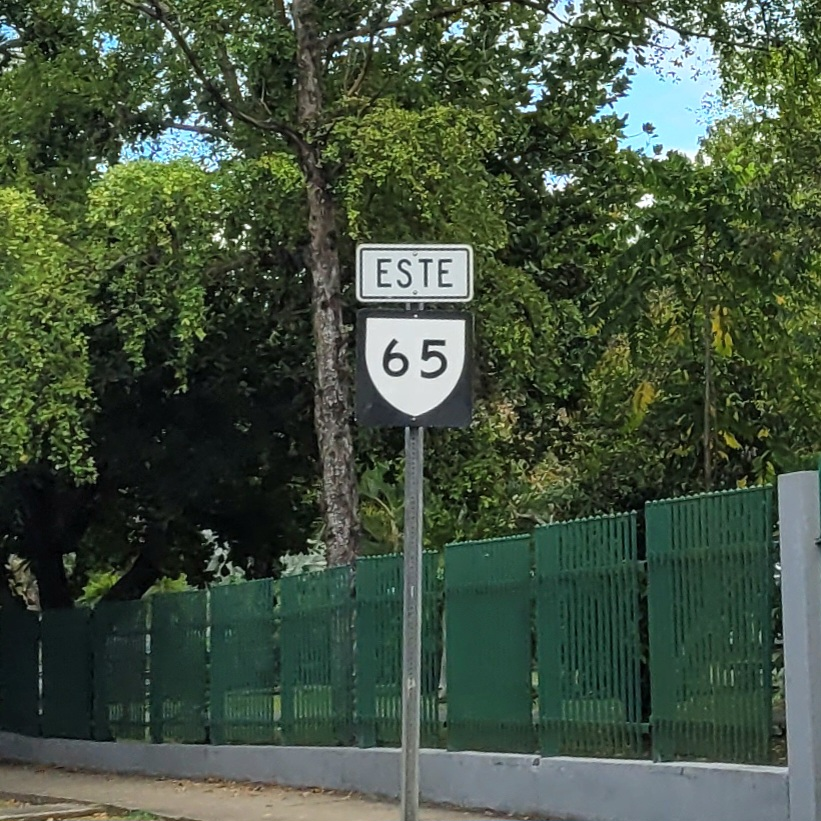
PR-65 eastbound sign near the western terminus in Mayagüez barrio-pueblo

== Major intersections ==
The entire route is located in Mayagüez.

Location	km	mi	Destinations	Notes
Mayagüez barrio-pueblo	0.0	0.0	PR-239 – Mayagüez, Aguadilla, Ponce	Western terminus of PR-65
Mayagüez barrio-pueblo–Miradero line	0.3	0.19	PR-108 – Mayagüez, Miradero, San Sebastián, Zoológico	
Miradero	0.6	0.37	PR-Calle Pabón Maristany – Mayagüez	
Mayagüez barrio-pueblo	0.92	0.57	PR-106 – Mayagüez, Las Marías, Maricao	Eastern terminus of PR-65
1.000 mi = 1.609 km; 1.000 km = 0.621 mi

== See also ==
- Pedro Albizu Campos
