= Puerto Rico Highway 104 =

Highway in Puerto Rico

Highway 104
- Ruta 104
- Carretera Doctor Victoriano Quintana Muñiz

Route information
- Maintained by Puerto Rico DTPW
- Length: 1.8 km (1.1 mi)

Major junctions
- South end: PR-3108 in Miradero
- PR-102 in Miradero–Algarrobos–Mayagüez barrio-pueblo
- North end: PR-2 in Algarrobos

Location
- Country: United States
- Territory: Puerto Rico
- Municipalities: Mayagüez

Highway system
- Roads in Puerto Rico; List
| ← PR-103 | → PR-105 |

Puerto Rico Highway 104 (PR-104) is a rural road located in Mayagüez, Puerto Rico. This highway begins at its intersection with PR-2 and PR-3108 in Miradero and ends at its junction with PR-2 in Algarrobos.

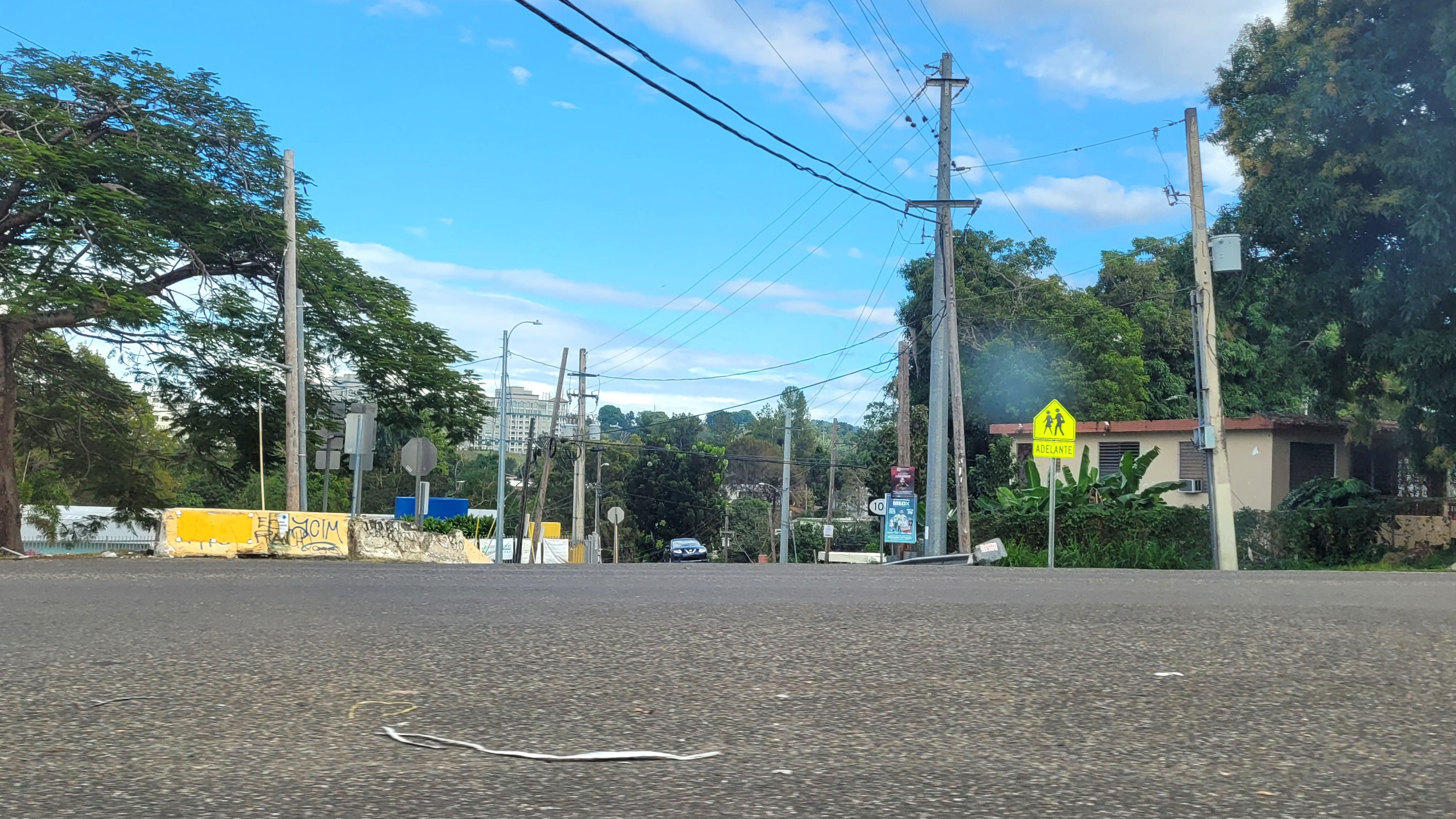
Northern terminus of PR-104 at PR-2 junction in Algarrobos, looking east

== Major intersections ==
The entire route is located in Mayagüez.

| Location | km | mi | Destinations | Notes |
|---|---|---|---|---|
| Miradero | 0.0 | 0.0 | PR-3108 (Paseo Juan Mari Brás) – Mayagüez | Southern terminus of PR-104 |
| Miradero–Algarrobos– Mayagüez barrio-pueblo tripoint | 0.6 | 0.37 | PR-102 – Mayagüez | |
| Algarrobos | 1.8 | 1.1 | PR-2 (Expreso Miguel A. García Méndez) – Mayagüez, Aguadilla | Northern terminus of PR-104 |
1.000 mi = 1.609 km; 1.000 km = 0.621 mi
