= Academia de la Inmaculada Concepción =

- Academia Immaculatae Conceptionis
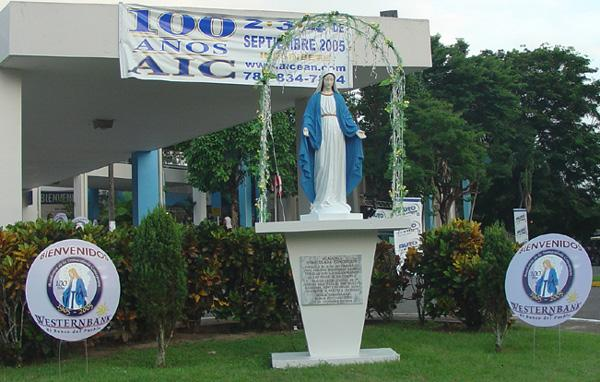
- High school building entrance during the centennial celebrations.

Location
- Carretera 108, Km 2.0 Miradero; Mayagüez, Puerto Rico 00681; 18°12′58.29″N 67°08′20.05″W

Information
- Type: Catholic school
- Motto: "Unidos venceremos, divididos caeremos."
- Established: 8 September 1905; 121 years ago
- School number: A 57-17 (Puerto Rico Education Council License)
- School code: 2944 (Use is limited to the PAA college-entry exams in Puerto Rico)
- CEEB code: 543320
- Principal: Héctor González Chimelis
- Headmaster: José J. Grillo
- Grades: Pre Pre-Kindergarten – 12
- Gender: Coeducational
- Enrollment: 728
- Colors: White and blue
- Mascot: Knight
- Website: www.academiainmaculada.com

The Academy of the Immaculate Conception (Spanish: Academia de la Inmaculada Concepción, generally abbreviated as AIC, or simply La Inmaculada) is a coeducational Catholic school located in Mayagüez, Puerto Rico. Founded in 1905, it is among Puerto Rico's oldest institutions of learning. Though established by the Daughters of Charity of Saint Vincent de Paul, since 2015 it is owned and operated by the Colegio Católico Notre Dame in Caguas.

The school is divided into two buildings in the same complex, one, located at 852 Road 108, Miradero, Mayagüez, has classrooms from Pre Pre-Kindergarten till fourth grade, while the other, at 850 Road 108, ranges from fifth grade up to twelfth grade. With the San Carlos School in Aguadilla, it is one of two Redemptorist-founded schools in the Mayagüez diocese. The school is a participant in the Free School Selection Program since its inception in 2019.

== History ==
In 1904, as a consequence of the entry of American women into Puerto Rican society, itself a result of the Treaty of Paris that ended the Spanish–American War, sisters belonging to the order of Daughters of Charity of St. Vincent de Paul from Emmitsburg, Maryland, arrived in Puerto Rico. The following 8 September 1905, at the behest of the Redemptorist Fathers, six sisters of the order, including Sister Mary Padden Cassini, opened Puerto Rico's first parochial. Originally named Academia San Vincente de Paul y La Candelaria, after the founder of the order and the patron saint of Mayagüez, it was later renamed to its present name. Originally it only taught primary levels, with 360 students enrolled in its first year. Later on, the sisters opened a second school, the Colegio del Carmen, in the Playa sector of Mayagüez barrio-pueblo, which closed down in 1998. Due to an increase in enrollment, the school acquired and moved into a larger building next to the previous location of the Casino de Mayagüez on Méndez Vigo Street. It was in this location where Sister Mary Padden Cassinni organized the precursor to the school cafeteria in Puerto Rico, earning her the distinction of being considered the mother of school cafeterias in Puerto Rico.

In 1908, the school started a two-year business and in 1913, the school held an Island Fair (Feria Insular), which featured oil paintings and textile work. The school building was destroyed by the 1918 San Fermín earthquake. After the earthquake, there were 26 students enrolled in the Junior Red Cross, contributing $6.50 in donations. Nonetheless, the school reopened in a temporary wooden building in September 1921. The following year, it expanded to include a four-year secondary school.

In 1923, La Inmaculada's impact was summarized thus:

...it has brought the benefit of high intellectual culture to thousands of children and young people in that city, where the benefit of such a careful education is appreciated.

— The Book of Porto Rico ("El Libro de Puerto Rico"),

The school received accreditation for the first time from the Puerto Rico Higher Education Commission (Spanish: Comisión de Educación Superior de Puerto Rico) in 1926. It was at La Inmaculada's auditorium in 1942, where parents of students at the University of Puerto Rico at Mayagüez gathered to send a telegram to then-dean Joseph Axtamayer, requesting his resignation. The school moved into a new building on José de Diego Street in 1957, enrollment reaching 1,300 students, including 400 high schoolers, during the next decade. At this time, the faculty comprised sisters from the founding order, Redemptorists Fathers and lay teachers. The knight mascot as well as the blue and white colors were adopted officially by La Inmaculada in 1966. In 1968 the school commenced construction on its present site in Miradero and started seeking Middle States (MSA) accreditation. On March of the following year, an MSA visiting committee evaluated the school and granted accreditation, while the following August the Miradero building was inaugurated with the relocation of the ninth to twelfth grades. The complex was expanded by the construction of a gymnasium in the early 1970s. In 1975, the Vincentian sisters announced their departure from the school. An annex to host the seventh and eight grades was built in 1986, and the following year, improvements to the sports facilities were carried out. Faced with the concern of an earthquake, La Inmaculada offered a seminar in September 1992 to train teachers and officials of the Mayagüez district of the Department of Education in the possibility of a seismic event.

Starting in January 1994, a new elementary school was being built in the Miradero complex, opening in September 1995.

To celebrate its centennial, the Senate of Puerto Rico congratulated La Inmaculada via a resolution in 2005.

On 14 February 2015, former student and NBA athlete José Juan Barea, went to La Inmaculada to inaugurate the José Juan Barea Cup in basketball.

=== Hurricane Maria, earthquakes and COVID-19 ===
La Inmaculada was the victor in both the first women and men's volleyball tournaments after Hurricane Maria in 2017. In the former, the school beat the Colegio San Benito, while in the latter they won over the Colegio San Augstín.

On 10 March 2018, the school was host to the Puerto Rico Oratory League's (Liga de Oratoria de Puerto Rico) competition. The following August, José Juan Barea, donated 500 desks, worth over $300,000, between La Inmaculada, CROEM, the Añasco Art and Music School and Juan Lino Santiago School in Aguada.

The 2019–20 earthquakes in the south of Puerto Rico caused damage to the school. This was concentrated towards the elementary school building, where several second-story classrooms had fissures. The school theorized that they might use air-conditioned trailers to offer classes.

On 9 February 2019, a grassland fire occurred behind the University of Puerto Rico at Mayagüez's Civil Engineering building, which is adjacent to La Inmaculada and close to the Dr. Juan A. Rivero Zoo. The following October, a student threatened a school shooting over Snapchat as vengeance for alleged bullying. This would have happened during the school's annual pep rally. The school denounced it to the police, who determined that there was no crime committed. It was also referred to the FBI, who also determined there was no criminal activity. Additionally, it was referred to the Minor's Advocate, with the school making press release determining that since it was referred, it no longer involved the school.

Since August, the school is a participant in the Free School Selection Program, underwhich students can receive a cost-free education in a private institution for one or two years.

In February 2021, there was an alleged case of cyberbullying by male twelfth grade students who were photoshopping female students' faces onto other bodies.

== School community ==
=== Accreditation ===
Since 1926, it has been accredited at times by the Puerto Rico Education Council, as in 2016 it was not, but by 2021 it had regained its accredited status. In addition, since 2015, the school has also been accredited by Cognia.

Even though La Inmaculada received initial accreditation from the Middles States Association in 1969, as of 2021, it no longer holds said distinction.

=== Student organizations ===
Students' organizations include: National Honor Society, Clubs and Student Council. The school's film club co-hosts the short film school festival Ponte los Cortos ("Put on the Shorts") at Cabo Rojo's Exclesior Cinema-Theatre.

The school's Knights Athletic Association hosts an annual Athlete's Night to recognize the school's athletes and coaches.

The school's cheerleading team has received donations from the government, such as $500.00 from the Legislative Assembly for uniforms and other costs. Since Antonio Fas Alzamora is an alumni, there was a strong bond between the Legislative Assembly and the school during his incumbency, such as when two Girl Scouts from the school occupied senators seats symbolically during a day in March 1996. Four years later, the twelfth grade class visited the Senate, where senators Rafael Luis Irizarry Cruz and Miriam J. Ramírez de Ferrer highlighted that their respective children had all graduated from the institution.

La Inmaculada is one of six schools in Puerto Rico that maintain an agreement with R2DEEP, the Recruitment, Retention and Distance Education in Engineering Program, which permits high school students participate in university-level courses and receive grades from the University of Puerto Rico at Mayagüez.

The school hosts alumni initiatives, such as Héctor Alexis Vargas' Patinero ("Skater") Foundation.

=== School administration ===
- Sr. Zoé–principal (c. 1968)
- Andrés Spacht, CSsR–Director-Pastor (c. 1986)
- Dr. Antonio Hernández, CSsR–Director-Reverend (c. 1994)

== Notable alumni ==
- José Enrique Arrarás Mir–first chancellor of the University of Puerto Rico at Mayagüez (1966–1971), former president of the Puerto Rico Olympic Committee (1973-1977), former-Secretary of Housing of Puerto Rico (1973–1976), former Liga Atlética Interuniversitaria de Puerto Rico Commissioner (2002–2018).
- J. J. Barea (5th–11th grade student)–NBA player.
- Lucy Boscana Bravo–actress, considered the "First Lady of Puerto Rican Theatre."
- Orlando Bravo–billionaire businessman, co-founder and managing partner of Thoma Bravo.
- Antonio J. Fas Alzamora–longest-serving legislator in the history of Puerto Rico.
- Luis Santaliz Capestany (Class of '39, High School)–Las Marías mayor (1945–1948), delegate to the Constitutional Convention (1951–1952) and Senator for the IV district (1961–1969).
