= Ovejas, Añasco, Puerto Rico =

Barrio of Puerto Rico

Ovejas
- Barrio
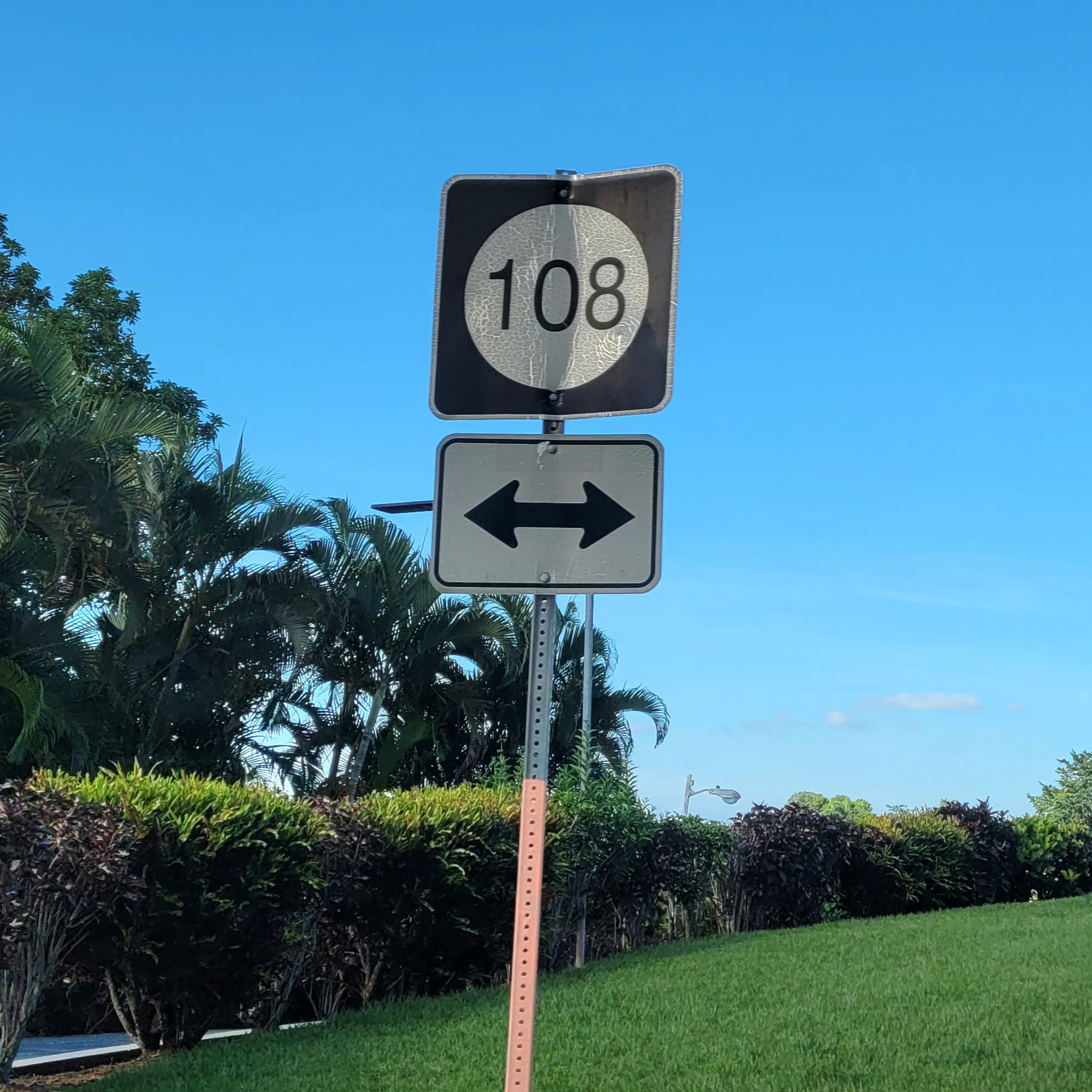
- Puerto Rico Highway 108 between Ovejas and Leguísamo

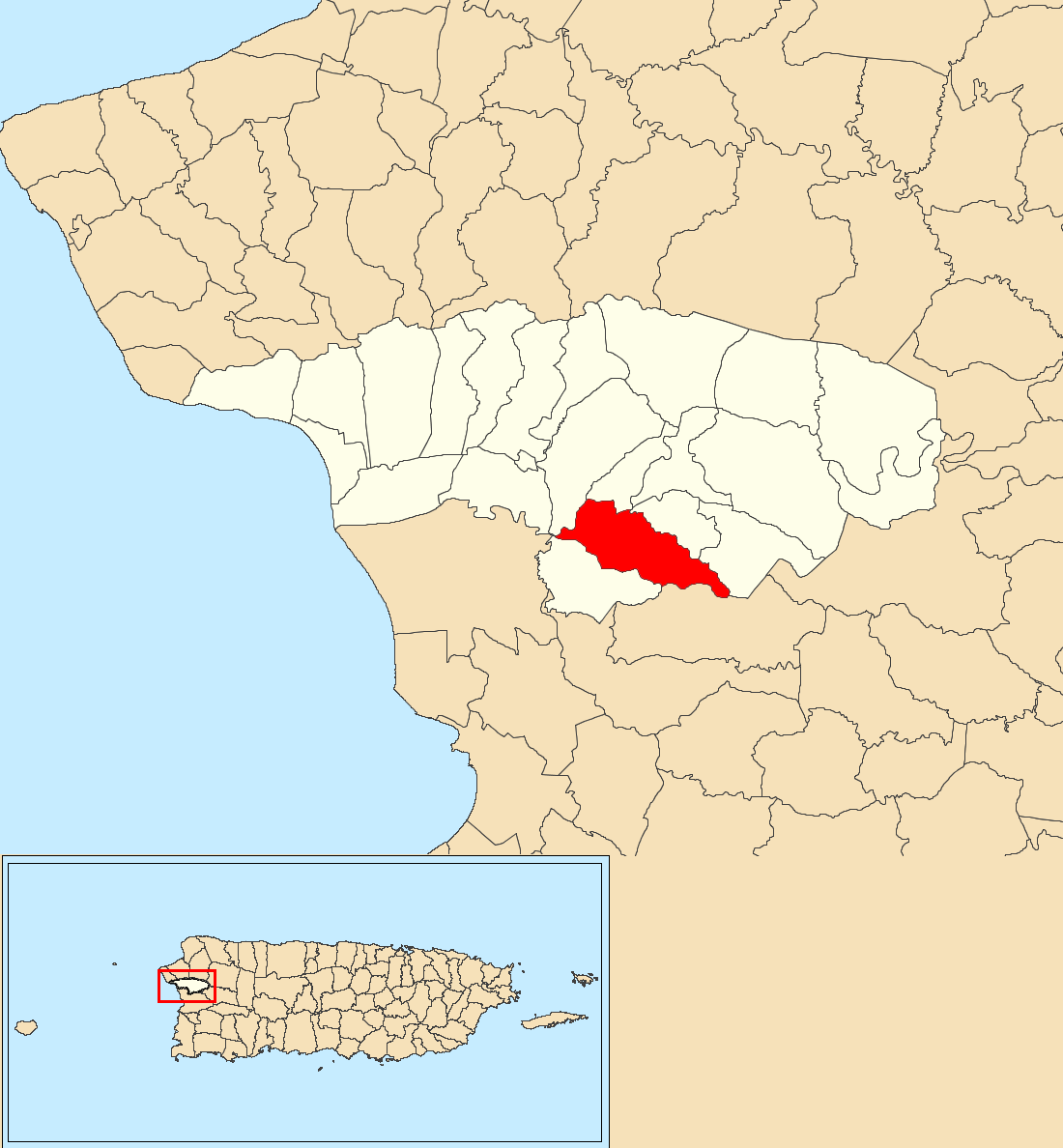
- Location of Ovejas within the municipality of Añasco shown in red

- Location of Puerto Rico
- Coordinates: 18°15′44″N 67°06′42″W
- Commonwealth: Puerto Rico
- Municipality: Añasco

Area
  - Total: 1.93 sq mi (5.0 km^{2})
  - Land: 1.92 sq mi (5.0 km^{2})
  - Water: 0.01 sq mi (0.026 km^{2})
- Elevation: 249 ft (76 m)

Population (2010)
  - Total: 1,549
  - Density: 806.8/sq mi (311.5/km^{2})
- Source: 2010 Census
- Time zone: UTC−4 (AST)

Ovejas is a barrio in the municipality of Añasco, Puerto Rico. Its population in 2010 was 1,549.

== History ==
Ovejas was in Spain's gazetteers until Puerto Rico was ceded by Spain in the aftermath of the Spanish–American War under the terms of the Treaty of Paris of 1898 and became an unincorporated territory of the United States. In 1899, the United States Department of War conducted a census of Puerto Rico finding that the combined population of Ovejas, Río Cañas, and Casey Arriba barrios was 1,257.

Historical population
Census	Pop.	Note	%±
1910	444		—
1920	543		22.3%
1930	653		20.3%
1940	571		−12.6%
1950	705		23.5%
1960	548		−22.3%
1970	610		11.3%
1980	1,010		65.6%
1990	1,250		23.8%
2000	1,603		28.2%
2010	1,549		−3.4%
U.S. Decennial Census; 1900 (N/A) 1910-1930; 1930-1950 1980-2000 2010

== Sectors ==
Barrios (which are, in contemporary times, roughly comparable to minor civil divisions) in turn are further subdivided into smaller local populated place areas/units called sectores (sectors in English). The types of sectores may vary, from normally sector to urbanización to reparto to barriada to residencial, among others.

The following sectors are in Ovejas barrio:

Égida Sendero de Amor, Extensión Aquilino, Parcelas Aquilino, Ramal 4430, Reparto Rosario, Sector Camino Arrarás, Sector Picheto Flores, and Tramo Carretera 430.

== See also ==
- List of communities in Puerto Rico
- List of barrios and sectors of Añasco, Puerto Rico
