= Parque de los Próceres =

Park in Mayagüez, Puerto Rico

Coordinates: 18°12′22.47″N 67°08′16.11″W

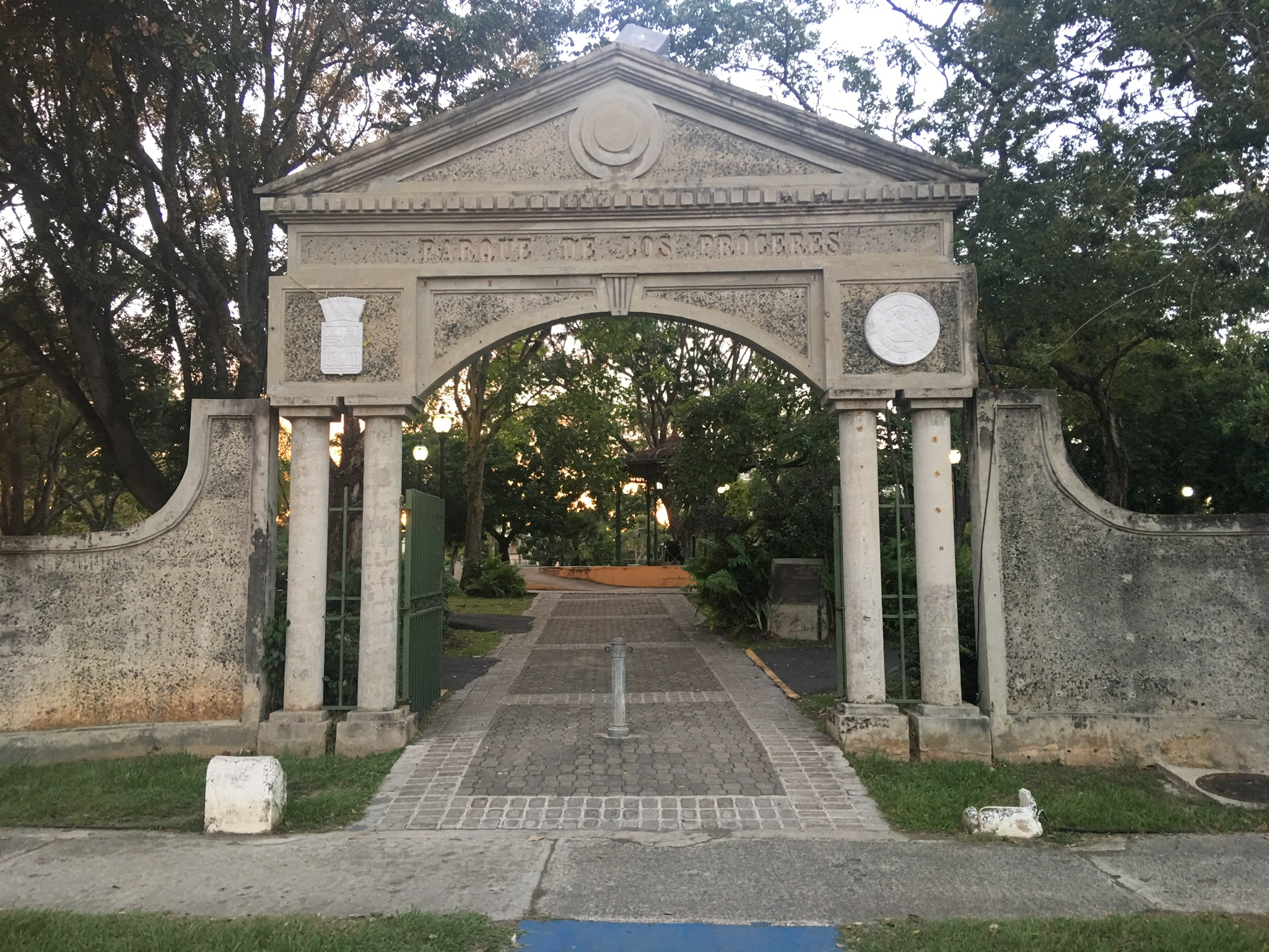
- Entrance to the Park of National Heroes in Mayagüez
- Interactive map of Parque de los Próceres
- Type: Urban park
- Location: Mayagüez, Puerto Rico
- Area: 2 acres (0.81 ha)
- Created: 1977
- Operator: City of Mayagüez

The Parque de los Próceres is a park in Mayagüez, Puerto Rico.

In 1977 the mayor of Mayagüez, Don Benjamín Cole obtained a grant from the Economic Development Administration of the United States Department of Commerce for the construction of the "Parque de los Próceres Puertorriqueños". The park is located in the banks of the Yagüez River between roads PR-108 and PR-65. The name of the park is Spanish for "Puerto Rican Patriots Park". It is located across the street from the Palacio de Recreación y Deportes.

The park's gardens are accentuated by commemorative plaques about prominent Puerto Ricans. It contains many paths appropriate for walks and bike riding, ornate gazebos and decorative ponds. Parque de los Próceres has been called "the lungs of the city of Mayagüez".
