= Southwestern Educational Society =

College preparatory school in Mayagüez, Puerto Rico

Location
- Route 108 Km 3.2 Camino Pitillo; Mayagüez 00681; Puerto Rico
- Coordinates: 18°14′03.81″N 67°08′25.86″W

Information
- Type: College Preparatory School
- Motto: “Success Awaits!”
- Established: 1973
- President: Dr. José Cedeño
- Head of school: Katrin Beinroth
- Grades: Daycare-12
- Accreditation: Middle States Association of Colleges and Schools
- Website: https://www.sesolion.com/

Southwestern Educational Society ("SESO") is a private, English language school in Mayagüez, a western municipality in Puerto Rico that was founded in 1973.

== History ==
In 1972 it was announced that the English speaking campus at the Inter-American University in San Germán would close the following year. An international group of concerned parents started planning a new school.

Southwestern Educational Society (Sociedad Educacional del Suroeste) was founded in 1973 as an independent, nonprofit organization to achieve these goals. The initials SESO have become the common name used by the community to identify the school.

== Timeline of events ==
- March 6, 1973 – First public meeting at the Firehouse in Mayagüez. Seven parents were elected to form the Board of Directors of the newly founded Southwestern Educational Society (SESO)
- August 1973 – SESO opened on the 2nd floor of the YMCA in Mayagüez. Eighty-eight students from Kinder through 8th grade were grouped into five classrooms. Ms. Nilda I. Rosado was Head Teacher – Principal. The school had a budget of $72,000 (tuition - $54,000 and donations of $18,000).
- Summer 1975 – SESO moved to a larger building in Barrio Miradero in Mayaguez. There were 150 students – Kinder through 9th grade. Mr. Ralph Gonzalez became the 1st School Principal.
- April 1991 – SESO received Middle States Accreditation (MSA).
- November 1992 – Lighting for the covered court became a reality thanks to a donation from Digital Equipment Corporation and the assistance of the school Parent – Teacher Organization (PTO).
- November 1993 – SESO celebrated its 20th anniversary at the Mayagüez Hilton. The newly constructed Snack Bar and Student Lounge were inaugurated.
- August 1994 – Project “SESO 2005”, a vision for the facilities development as part of the strategic planning process by the Board of Directors under the leadership of school director Miguel Arzola-Barris, Esq., was unveiled.
- August 1995 – The computer lab was equipped with twenty-five stations.
- April 1996 – Inauguration of restroom facilities at the Covered Court. Pre-Kinder services were extended to a full day program.
- September 1996 – Inauguration of the new administrative offices and facilities.
- May 1998 – Plans for the multipurpose building and classrooms’ wing were presented to the school community.
- June 1998 – Gala celebration at “Casa del Medico” and a Family Day at the “Club Deportivo del Oeste” in celebration of the school's 25th Anniversary.
- January 2000 – Groundbreaking for the multipurpose building.
- August 2000 – Inauguration of the multipurpose building and Daycare Program.
- March 2001 – Student enrollment reached 800.
- May 2001 – Annual grade promotions and graduation ceremonies were held for the first time on school facilities.
- August 2001 – An Accreditation for Growth visiting committee positively recommended SESO for MSA re-accreditation.
- August 2002 – Completion of Project “SESO 2005”. The facilities included High School and Elementary School libraries, a Cafetorium that could accommodate up to 800 students, a new Computer Lab, a Science Lab and an access ramp in compliance with ADA regulations and an inclusive policy.
- February 2003 – Venice Masquerade Fund Raising Gala and Fashion Show were held in celebration of the school's 30th Anniversary.
- August 2004 – Inauguration of Pre-School Building and the access beltway around campus. SESO becomes an independent Regional Science Fair site.

== School and community ==
SESO is an independent, nonprofit, English language school serving the children from local, U.S. and international families of the area. Operating as a college preparatory school, SESO exists to provide a coeducational day school program at the elementary and secondary school levels. The student-teacher ratio is 24 to 1.

Privately incorporated in 1973, SESO is dependent on tuition and donations for its income.

The bass player of one of the most successful Puerto Rican rock bands Sol D'Menta, Erick "Jey" Seda is a mathematics teacher at SESO. The coach of SESO math team is Roman Kvasov, who is also the tutor of the National Mathematics Team of Puerto Rico.

Since 2012 SESO counts with an afternoon program for mathematically gifted students and hosts "All Girls Math Bowl"—the only mathematics competition on the island for girls only.

Amongst its notable alumni are Monti Carlo and Raquel Sofía, Jose Juan Barea attended elementary.

== Accreditation and membership ==
SESO is accredited by the Middle States Association of Colleges and Schools and licensed to operate by the General Council of Education of Puerto Rico. School memberships include: Puerto Rico Private Education Association (AEP), Caribbean Association of Independent Schools (CAIS), National Association of Secondary School Principals (NASSP), National Honor Society (NHS), English Forensic League and the Catholic Athletic League (LAC).
