= Leguísamo =

Barrio of Mayagüez, Puerto Rico

- Barrio
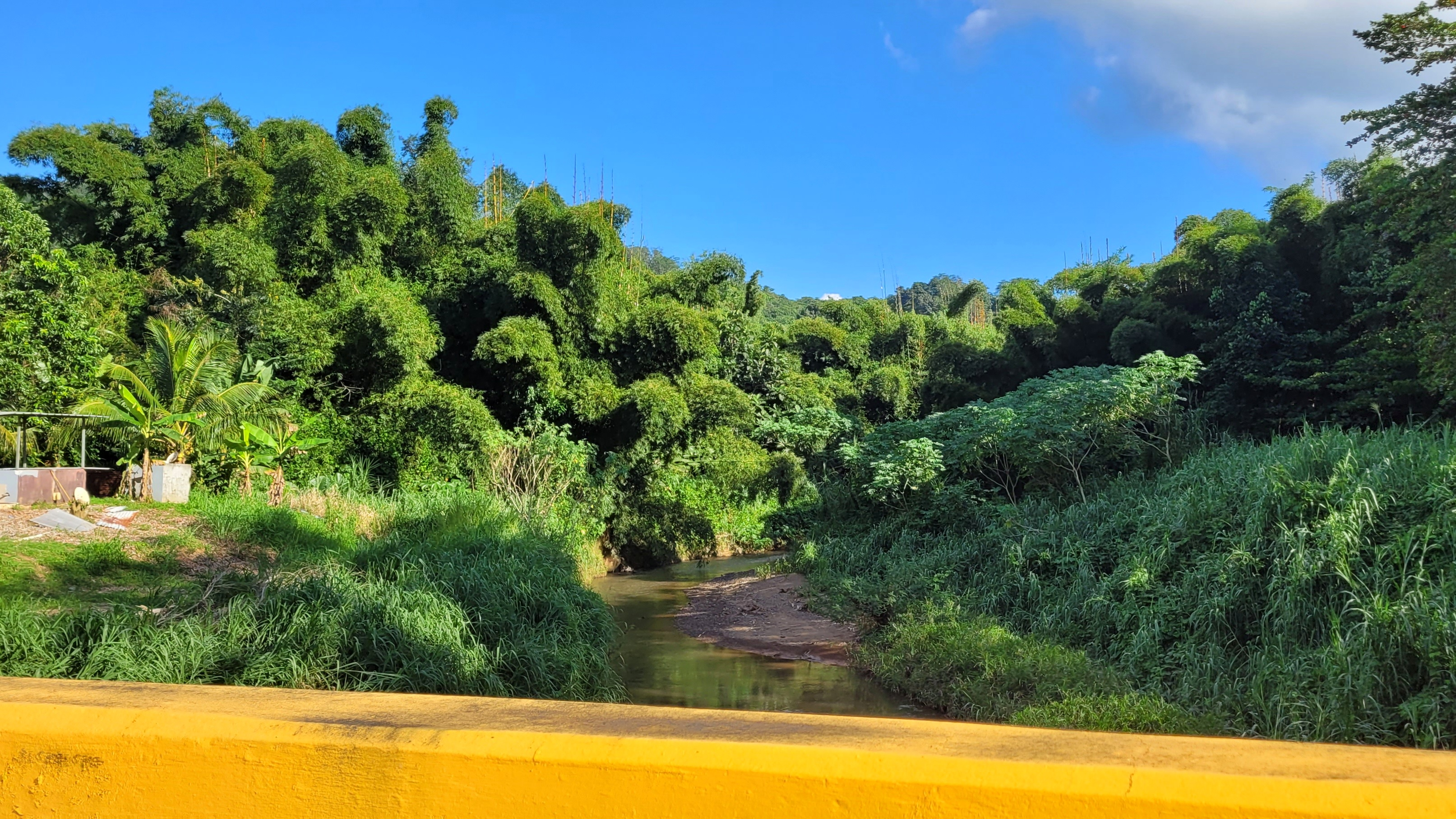
- Río Cañas between Leguísamo and Río Cañas Abajo

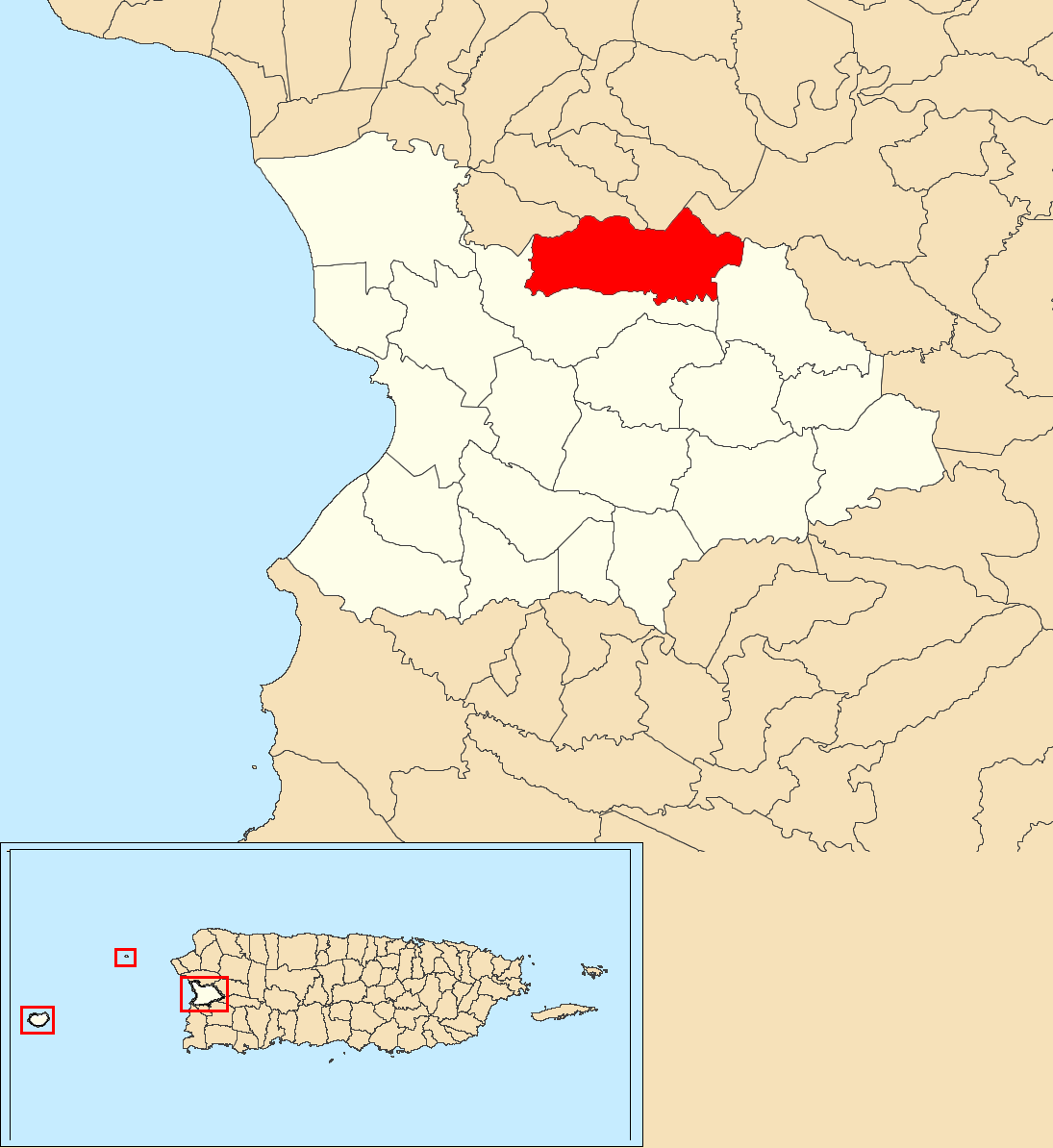
- Location of Leguísamo within the municipality of Mayagüez shown in red

- Location of Puerto Rico
- Coordinates: 18°14′32″N 67°05′39″W
- Commonwealth: Puerto Rico
- Municipality: Mayagüez

Area
  - Total: 3.76 sq mi (9.7 km^{2})
  - Land: 3.76 sq mi (9.7 km^{2})
  - Water: 0 sq mi (0 km^{2})
- Elevation: 735 ft (224 m)

Population (2010)
  - Total: 2,096
  - Density: 557.4/sq mi (215.2/km^{2})
- Source: 2010 Census
- Time zone: UTC−4 (AST)

Leguísamo is a barrio in the municipality of Mayagüez, Puerto Rico. Its population in 2010 was 2096.

== History ==
Leguísamo was in Spain's gazetteers until Puerto Rico was ceded by Spain in the aftermath of the Spanish–American War under the terms of the Treaty of Paris of 1898 and became an unincorporated territory of the United States. In 1899, the United States Department of War conducted a census of Puerto Rico finding that the population of Leguísamo barrio was 1,228.

Historical population
Census	Pop.	Note	%±
1900	1,228		—
1910	906		−26.2%
1920	1,216		34.2%
1930	859		−29.4%
1940	906		5.5%
1950	1,091		20.4%
1960	946		−13.3%
1970	1,224		29.4%
1980	1,379		12.7%
1990	1,774		28.6%
2000	2,080		17.2%
2010	2,096		0.8%
U.S. Decennial Census; 1899 (shown as 1900) 1910-1930; 1930-1950 1980-2000 2010

== See also ==
- List of communities in Puerto Rico
