= Casey Arriba, Añasco, Puerto Rico =

Barrio of Puerto Rico

Casey Arriba
- Barrio
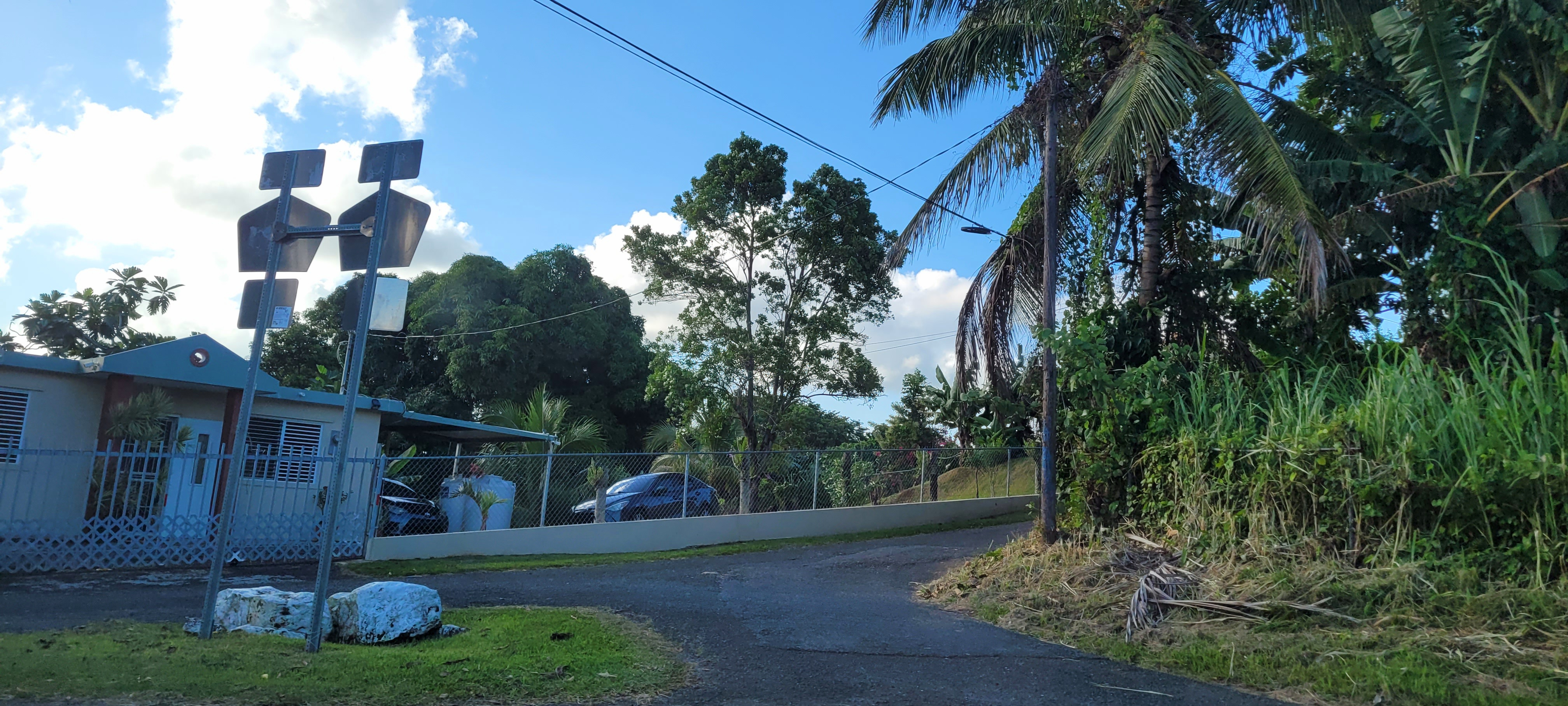
- Puerto Rico Highway 4430 between Ovejas and Casey Arriba

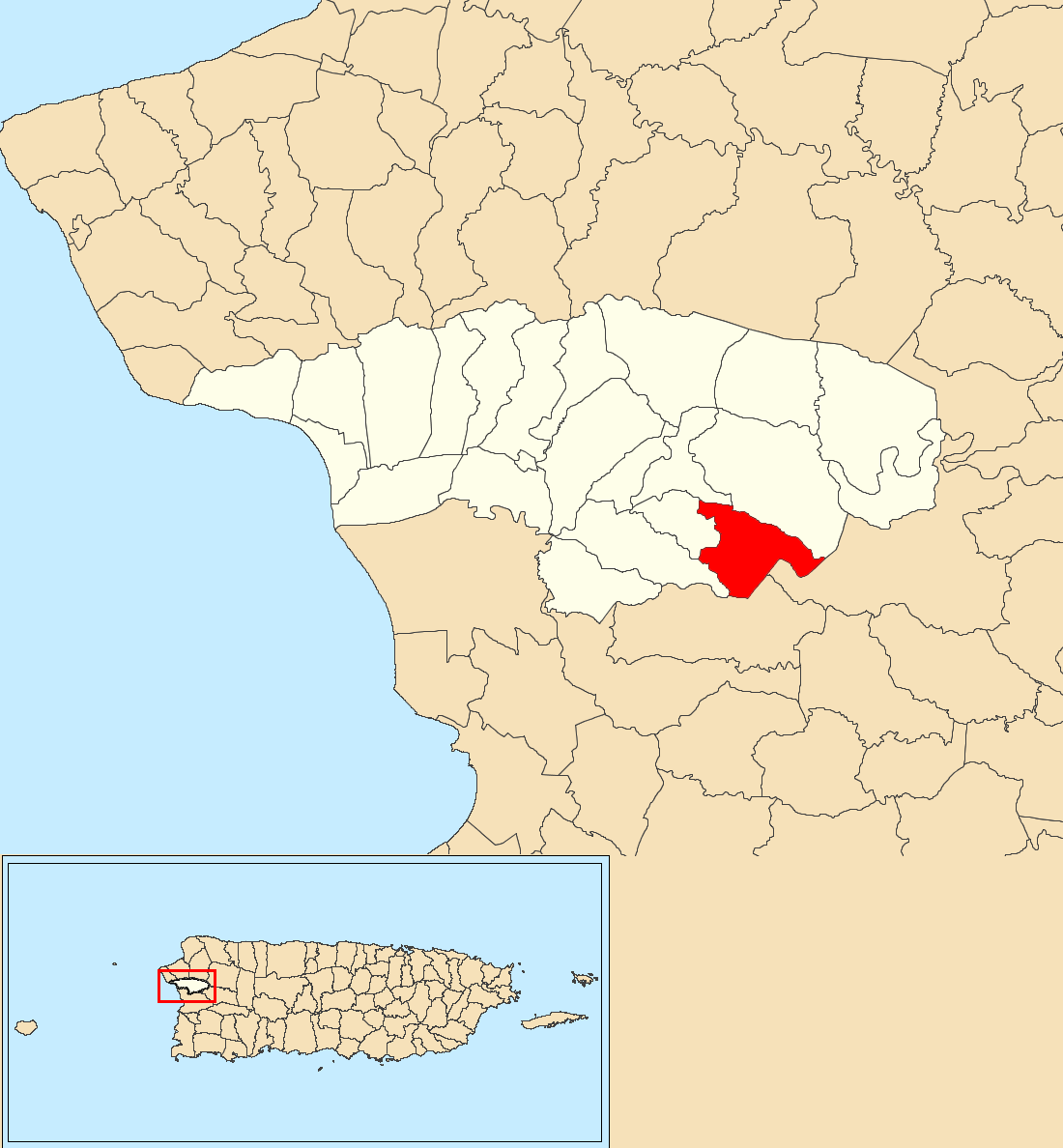
- Location of Casey Arriba within the municipality of Añasco shown in red

- Location of Puerto Rico
- Coordinates: 18°15′39″N 67°05′10″W
- Commonwealth: Puerto Rico
- Municipality: Añasco

Area
  - Total: 1.63 sq mi (4.2 km^{2})
  - Land: 1.63 sq mi (4.2 km^{2})
  - Water: 0.00 sq mi (0 km^{2})
- Elevation: 302 ft (92 m)

Population (2010)
  - Total: 549
  - Density: 336.8/sq mi (130.0/km^{2})
- Source: 2010 Census
- Time zone: UTC−4 (AST)

Casey Arriba is a barrio in the municipality of Añasco, Puerto Rico. Its population in 2010 was 549.

== History ==
Casey Arriba was in Spain's gazetteers until Puerto Rico was ceded by Spain in the aftermath of the Spanish–American War under the terms of the Treaty of Paris of 1898 and became an unincorporated territory of the United States. In 1899, the United States Department of War conducted a census of Puerto Rico finding that the combined population of Casey Arriba, Ovejas, and Río Cañas barrios was 1,257.

Historical population
Census	Pop.	Note	%±
1910	360		—
1920	341		−5.3%
1930	265		−22.3%
1940	294		10.9%
1950	326		10.9%
1960	376		15.3%
1970	365		−2.9%
1980	375		2.7%
1990	496		32.3%
2000	523		5.4%
2010	549		5.0%
U.S. Decennial Census; 1900 (N/A) 1910-1930; 1930-1950 1980-2000 2010

== Sectors ==
Barrios (which are, in contemporary times, roughly comparable to minor civil divisions) in turn are further subdivided into smaller local populated place areas/units called sectores (sectors in English). The types of sectores may vary, from normally sector to urbanización to reparto to barriada to residencial, among others.

The following sectors are in Casey Arriba barrio:

Sector Mata y Orsini, and Sector Pepe Traval.

== See also ==
- List of communities in Puerto Rico
- List of barrios and sectors of Añasco, Puerto Rico
