= Palacio de Recreación y Deportes =

Coliseum located in the city of Mayagüez, Puerto Rico

Coordinates: 18°12′21.37″N 67°08′09.02″W

- El Palacio
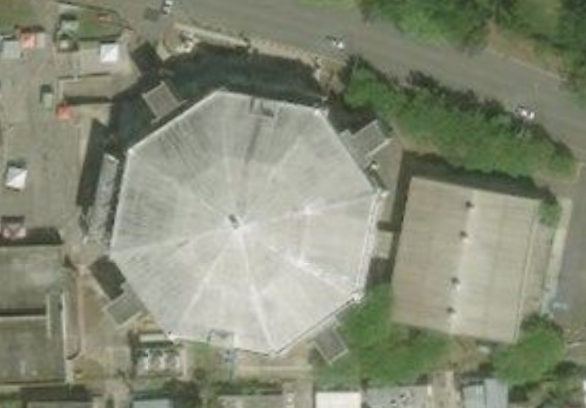
- Satellite view, 2018
- Interactive map of Palacio de Recreación y Deportes
- Full name: Palacio de Recreación y Deportes de Mayagüez German Wilkins Vélez Ramírez
- Location: Barrio Miradero; Mayagüez, Puerto Rico
- Owner: Municipality of Mayagüez
- Operator: Municipality of Mayagüez
- Capacity: 5,500

Construction
- Opened: 1981

Tenants
- Indios de Mayagüez (BSN); Indias de Mayagüez (LVSF); 2010 Central American and Caribbean Games

The Palacio de Recreación y Deportes German Wilkins Vélez Ramírez (German Wilkins Vélez Ramírez Recreation and Sports Palace), previously known as Palacio de Recreación y Deportes (Recreation and Sports Palace) and Palacio de los Deportes (Sports Palace), is a coliseum located across the street from Parque de los Próceres in the municipality of Mayagüez in Puerto Rico since its opening in 1981. Since 2011, the arena was bears the name of singer-songwriter Germán Wilkins Vélez Ramírez (professionally known as Wilkins), the Mayagüez native who inaugurated it. Remodeled in preparation for the 2010 Central American and Caribbean Games, it has a capacity for 5,500 spectators. It also has an acoustic conch outside, bearing the name of another Mayagüez native Frankie Ruiz.

The arena is the home of Baloncesto Superior Nacional professional basketball team, Indios de Mayagüez since 1981. The professional volleyball team Indias de Mayagüez from Liga de Voleibol Superior Femenino also play at the arena.

== Keylla Hernández ceremony ==
Part of the funeral services of the famous Puerto Rican television news anchorwoman, Keylla Hernández were held at the Palacio de Recreacion y Deportes on January 2, 2019.
