= Río Cañas Abajo, Mayagüez, Puerto Rico =

Barrio of Puerto Rico

Río Cañas Abajo
- Barrio
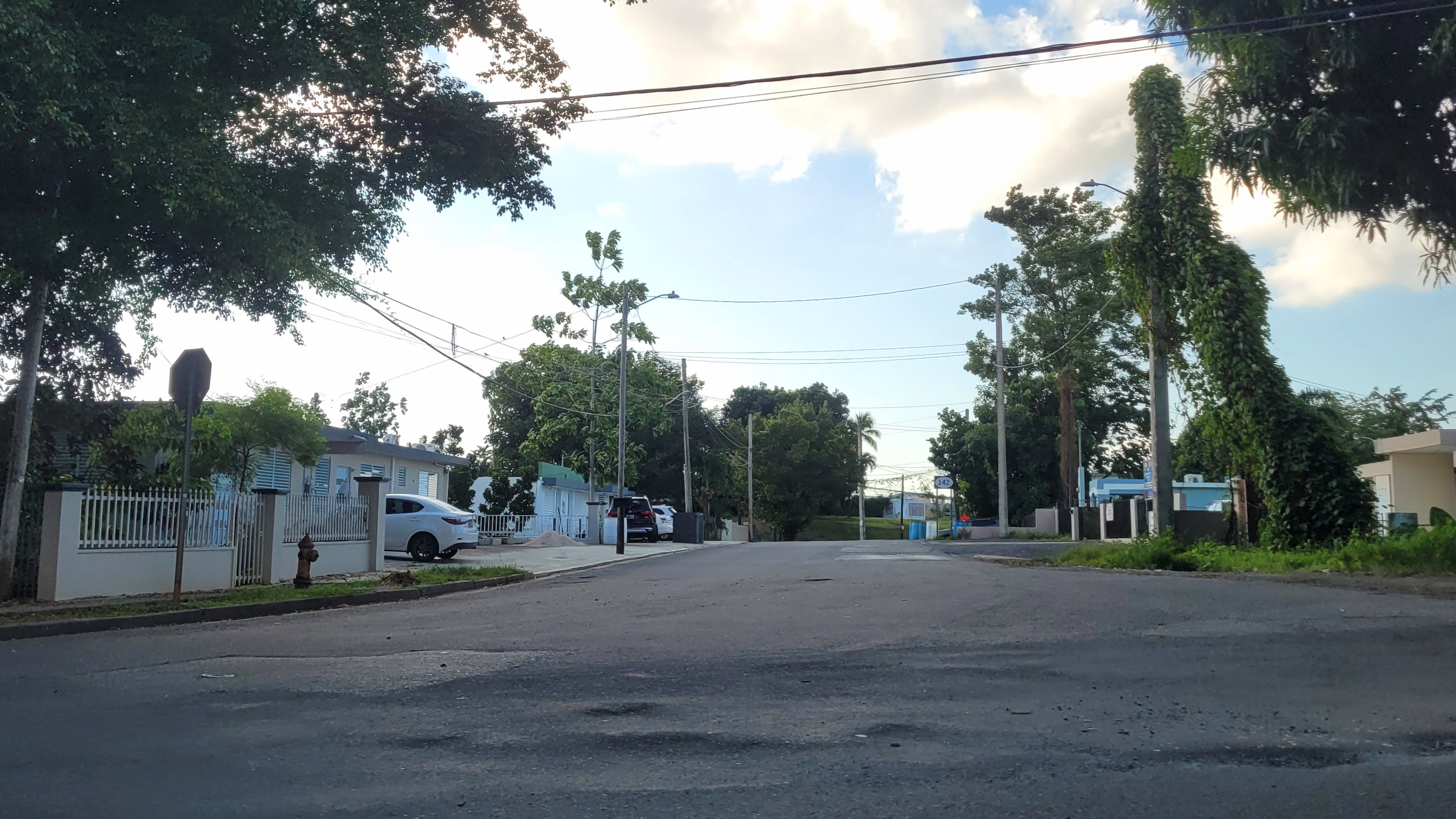
- Puerto Rico Highway 342 between Miradero and Río Cañas Abajo

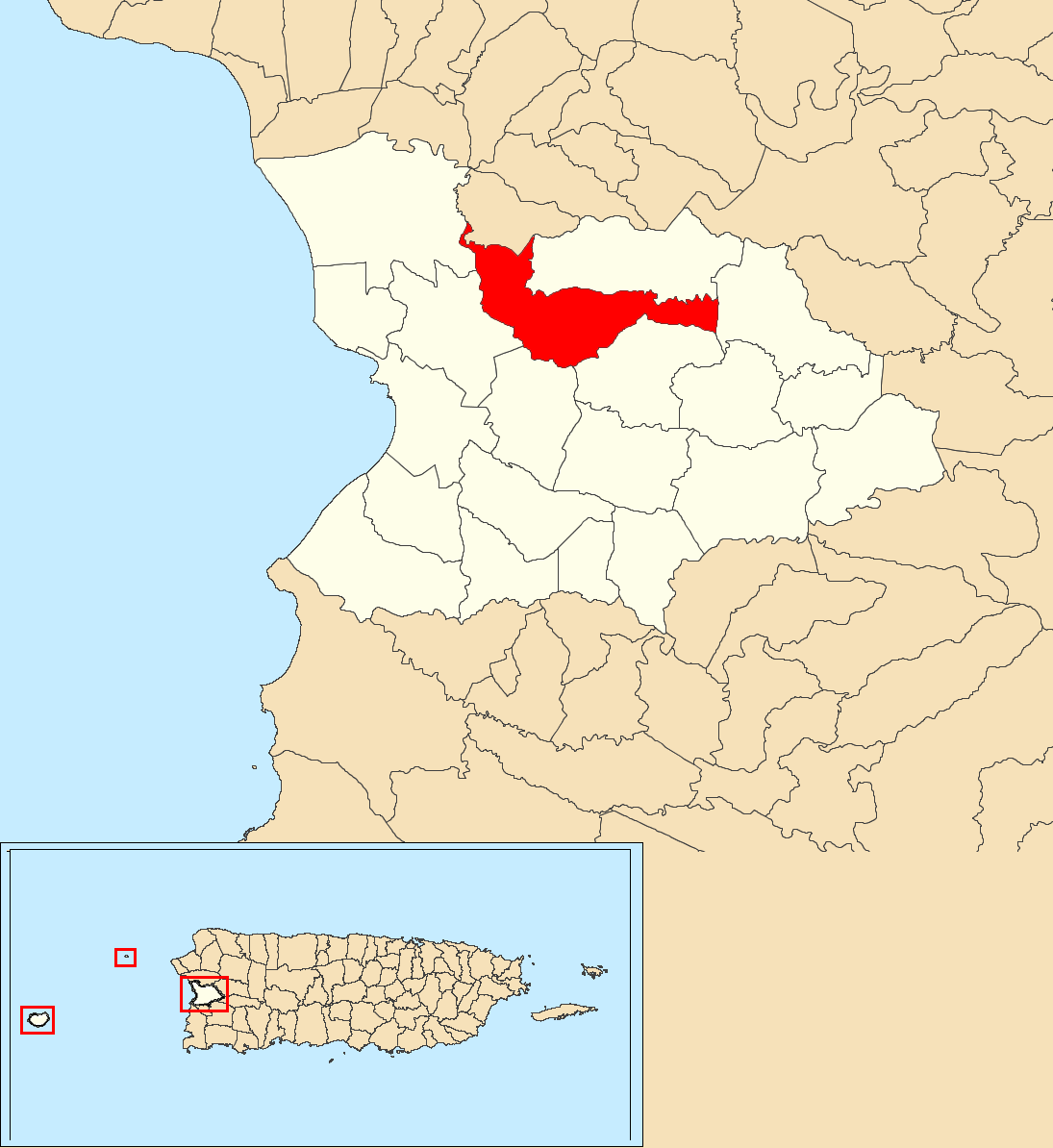
- Location of Río Cañas Abajo within the municipality of Mayagüez shown in red

- Location of Puerto Rico
- Coordinates: 18°13′48″N 67°06′36″W
- Commonwealth: Puerto Rico
- Municipality: Mayagüez

Area
  - Total: 3.57 sq mi (9.2 km^{2})
  - Land: 3.57 sq mi (9.2 km^{2})
  - Water: 0 sq mi (0 km^{2})
- Elevation: 443 ft (135 m)

Population (2010)
  - Total: 2,459
  - Density: 688.8/sq mi (265.9/km^{2})
- Source: 2010 Census
- Time zone: UTC−4 (AST)

Río Cañas Abajo is a barrio in the municipality of Mayagüez, Puerto Rico. Its population in 2010 was 2,459.

== History ==
Río Cañas Abajo was in Spain's gazetteers until Puerto Rico was ceded by Spain in the aftermath of the Spanish–American War under the terms of the Treaty of Paris of 1898 and became an unincorporated territory of the United States. In 1899, the United States Department of War conducted a census of Puerto Rico finding that the population of Río Cañas Abajo barrio was 1,095.

Historical population
Census	Pop.	Note	%±
1900	1,095		—
1910	1,030		−5.9%
1920	1,018		−1.2%
1930	845		−17.0%
1940	1,040		23.1%
1950	939		−9.7%
1960	925		−1.5%
1970	897		−3.0%
1980	1,410		57.2%
1990	1,958		38.9%
2000	2,318		18.4%
2010	2,459		6.1%
U.S. Decennial Census; 1899 (shown as 1900) 1910-1930; 1930-1950 1980-2000 2010

== See also ==
- List of communities in Puerto Rico
