= Algarrobos =

Barrio of Mayagüez, Puerto Rico

- Barrio
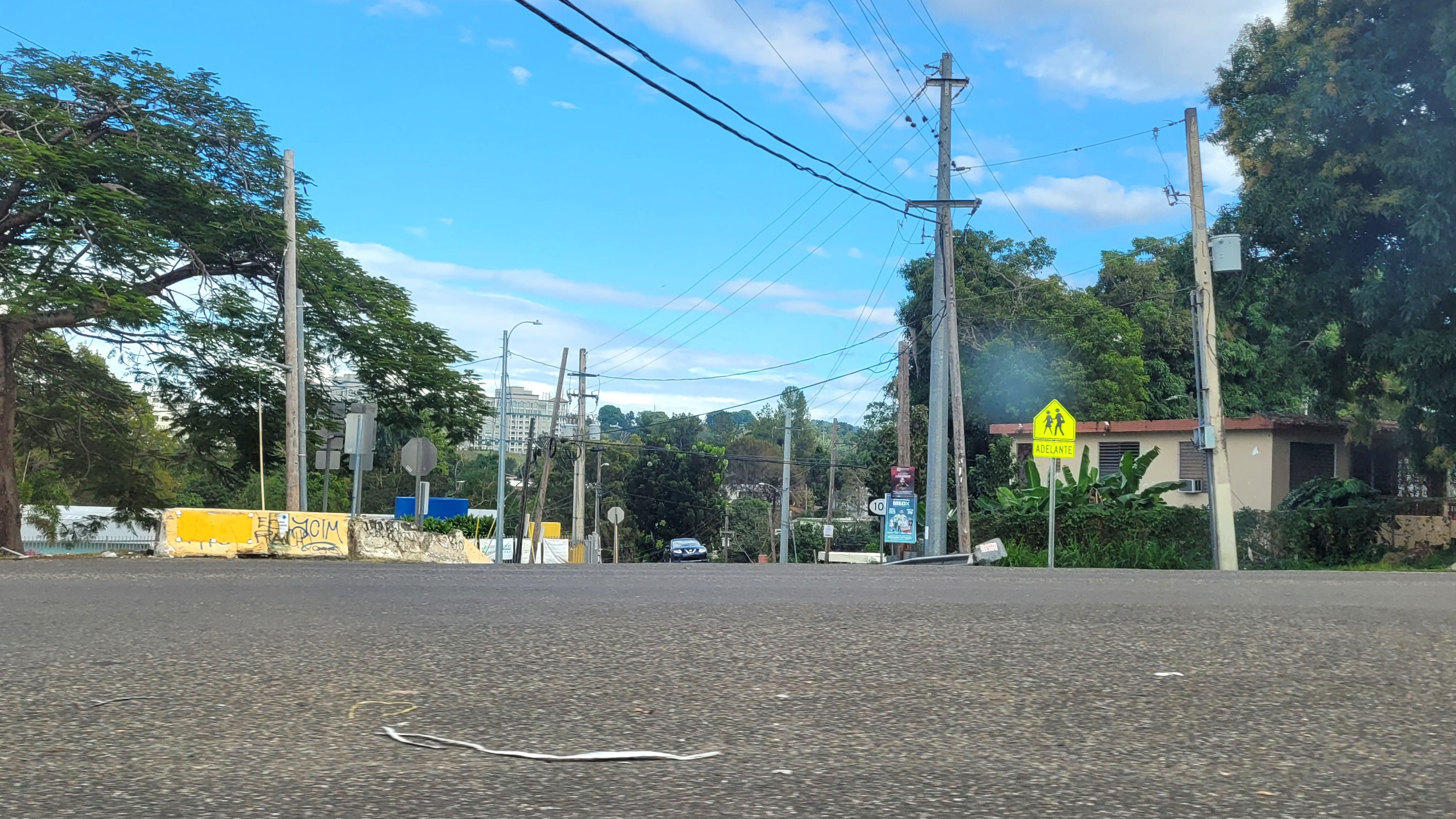
- Puerto Rico Highway 104 in Algarrobos

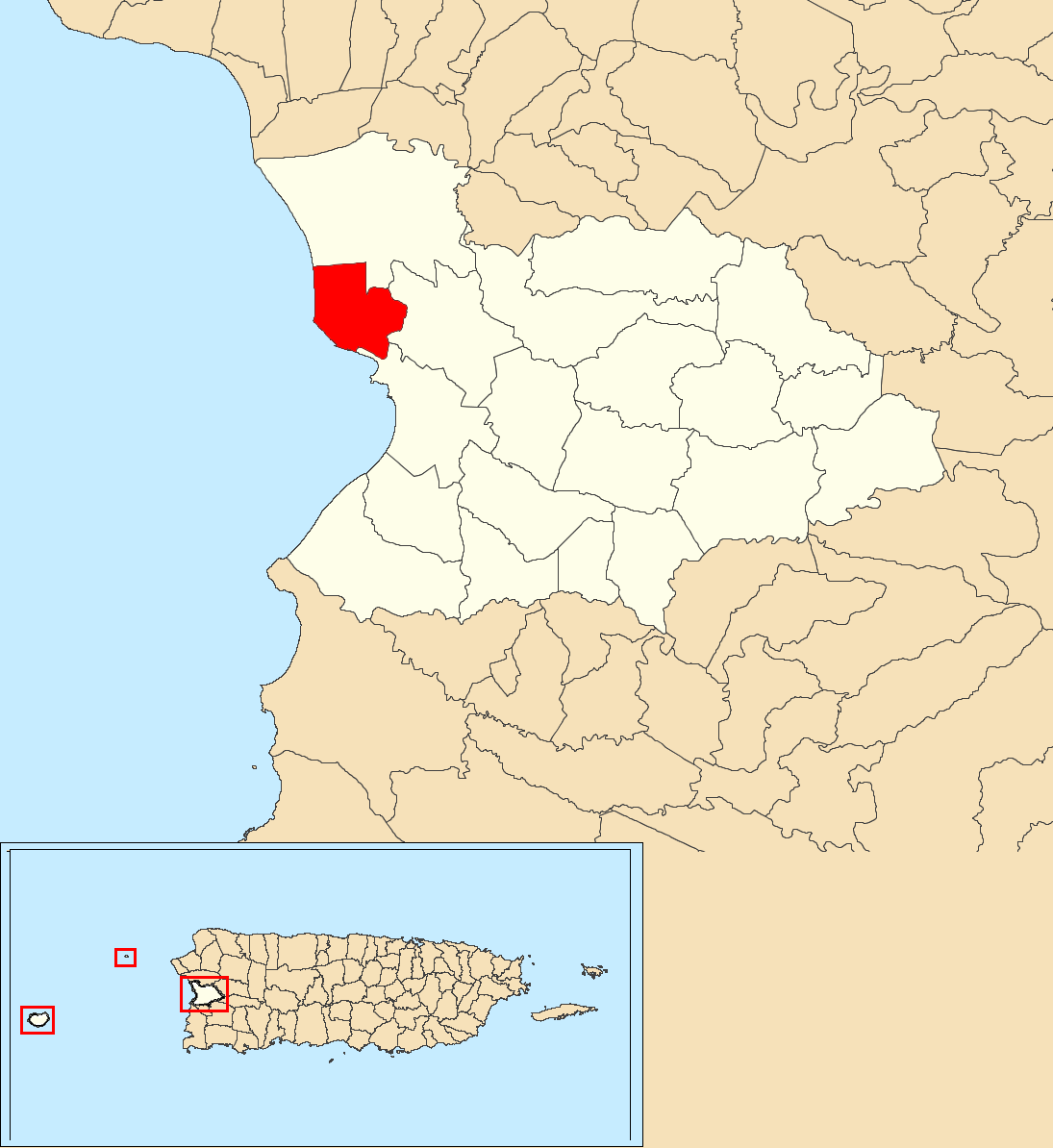
- Location of Algarrobos within the municipality of Mayagüez shown in red

- Location of Puerto Rico
- Coordinates: 18°13′47″N 67°10′02″W
- Commonwealth: Puerto Rico
- Municipality: Mayagüez

Area
  - Total: 2.43 sq mi (6.3 km^{2})
  - Land: 1.66 sq mi (4.3 km^{2})
  - Water: 0.77 sq mi (2.0 km^{2})
- Elevation: 72 ft (22 m)

Population (2010)
  - Total: 4,383
  - Density: 2,640.4/sq mi (1,019.5/km^{2})
- Source: 2010 Census
- Time zone: UTC−4 (AST)

Algarrobos is a barrio in the municipality of Mayagüez, Puerto Rico. Its population in 2010 was 4,383.

== Background ==
Algarrobos is a coastal, rural barrio deriving its name from the Algarrobo tree. The Algarrobo tree is leguminous, with shiny leaves and purple and white flowers. Its fruit is the carob bean, which consists of seeds covered by an edible substance, contained in a capsule-shaped pod.

== History ==
Mayagüez was a perfect smugglers' shelter for being a distance away from the barracks occupied by authorities. Its value was the strategic entrance to the Castillo de los Valdés in Algarrobos. In the eighteenth and nineteenth centuries there was in its jurisdiction a stronghold, the Algarrobo Fort, and Spanish battalions were there, one by the sea and another on the west side of Cerro de El Vigia. In the mid-twentieth century there was an American battalion located by the sea in the vicinity of Peña Cortada.

Algarrobos was in Spain's gazetteers until Puerto Rico was ceded by Spain in the aftermath of the Spanish–American War under the terms of the Treaty of Paris of 1898 and became an unincorporated territory of the United States. In 1899, the United States Department of War conducted a census of Puerto Rico finding that the population of Algarrobo barrio was 1,054.

Historical population
Census	Pop.	Note	%±
1900	1,054		—
1910	1,003		−4.8%
1920	965		−3.8%
1930	1,422		47.4%
1940	1,796		26.3%
1950	1,380		−23.2%
1960	2,219		60.8%
1970	2,769		24.8%
1980	5,354		93.4%
1990	5,074		−5.2%
2000	4,792		−5.6%
2010	4,383		−8.5%
U.S. Decennial Census; 1899 (shown as 1900) 1910-1930; 1930-1950 1980-2000 2010

== Economy ==
Between 1962 and 1998 it was the base port and the headquarters of the largest tuna factory in America.

== See also ==
- List of communities in Puerto Rico
