= Río Cañas, Añasco, Puerto Rico =

Barrio of Puerto Rico

Río Cañas
- Barrio
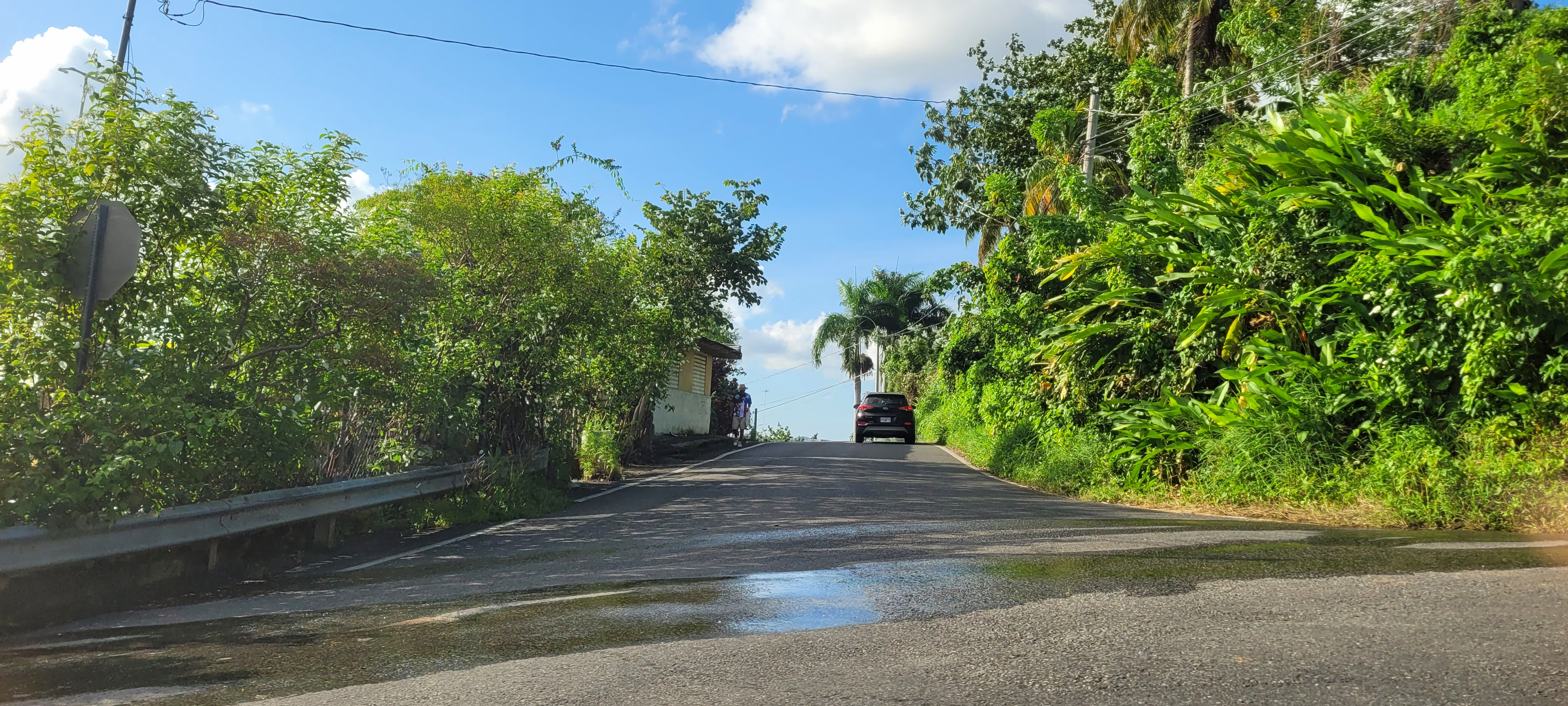
- Puerto Rico Highway 430 between Río Cañas and Ovejas

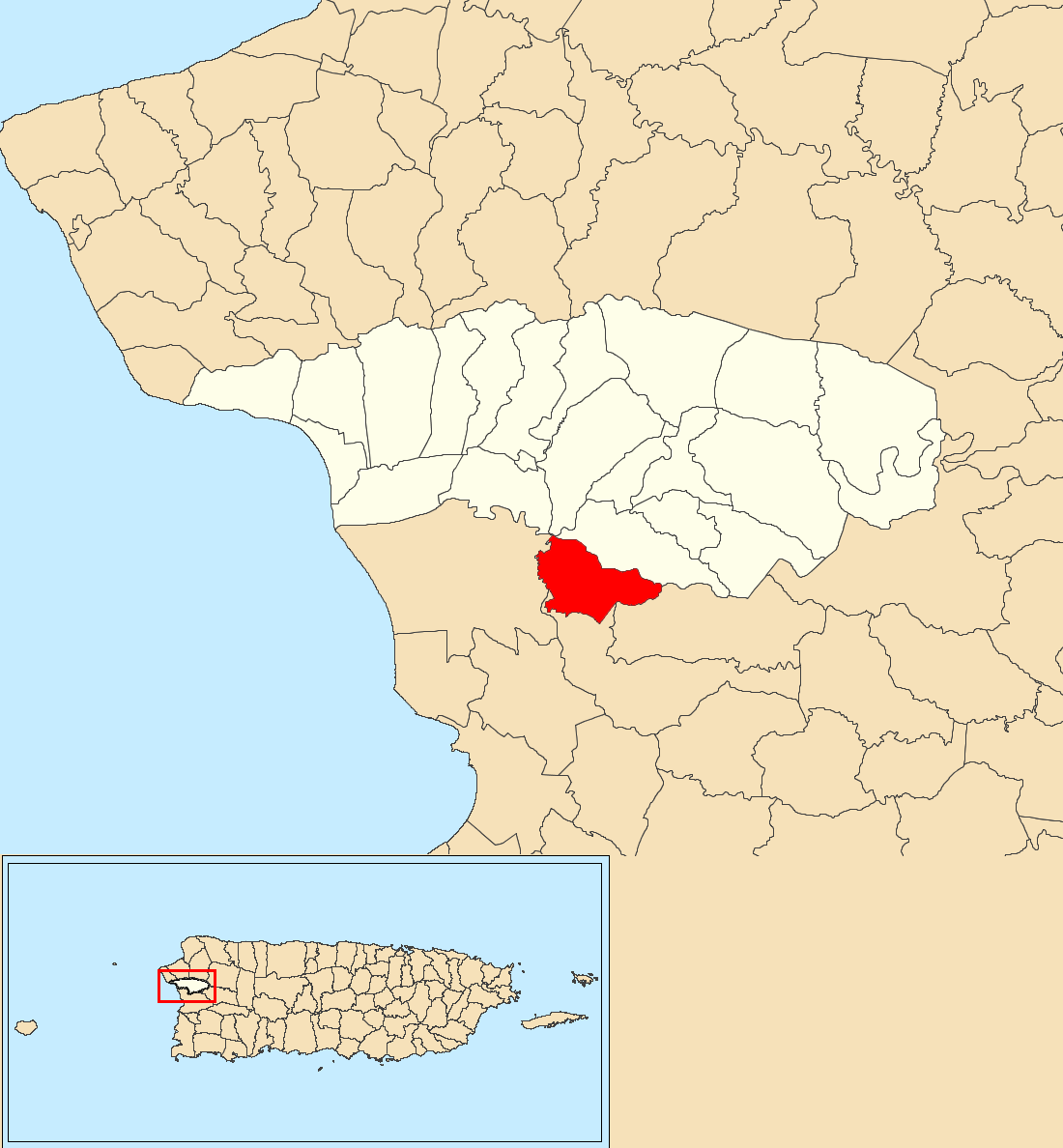
- Location of Río Cañas within the municipality of Añasco shown in red

- Location of Puerto Rico
- Coordinates: 18°14′58″N 67°07′27″W
- Commonwealth: Puerto Rico
- Municipality: Añasco

Area
  - Total: 1.55 sq mi (4.0 km^{2})
  - Land: 1.55 sq mi (4.0 km^{2})
  - Water: 0.00 sq mi (0 km^{2})
- Elevation: 115 ft (35 m)

Population (2010)
  - Total: 300
  - Density: 193.5/sq mi (74.7/km^{2})
- Source: 2010 Census
- Time zone: UTC−4 (AST)

Río Cañas is a barrio in the municipality of Añasco, Puerto Rico. Its population in 2010 was 300.

== History ==
Río Cañas was in Spain's gazetteers until Puerto Rico was ceded by Spain in the aftermath of the Spanish–American War under the terms of the Treaty of Paris of 1898 and became an unincorporated territory of the United States. In 1899, the United States Department of War conducted a census of Puerto Rico finding that the combined population of Río Cañas, Casey Arriba and Ovejas barrios was 1,257.

Historical population
Census	Pop.	Note	%±
1910	381		—
1920	329		−13.6%
1930	225		−31.6%
1940	293		30.2%
1950	307		4.8%
1960	232		−24.4%
1970	193		−16.8%
1980	321		66.3%
1990	542		68.8%
2000	284		−47.6%
2010	300		5.6%
U.S. Decennial Census; 1900 (N/A) 1910-1930; 1930-1950 1980-2000 2010

== See also ==
- List of communities in Puerto Rico
- List of barrios and sectors of Añasco, Puerto Rico
