= Puerto Rico Natural Resources Ranger Corps =

Law enforcement conservation officers

- Motto: Protect, Conserve

Agency overview
- Formed: June 29, 1979
- Employees: 310 (2021)

Jurisdictional structure
- Operations jurisdiction: Puerto Rico, United States
- Area: 5,324 square miles (13,790 km^{2})
- Population: 3,994,259 (2007 estimate)
- Constituting instrument: Constitution of the Commonwealth of Puerto Rico
- General nature: Civilian police

Operational structure
- Headquarters: Rio Piedras, Puerto Rico
- Agency executive: Félix Salas, Commissioner
- Parent agency: Department of Natural and Environmental Resources of Puerto Rico
- Units: Aerial Patrol; Marine Patrol; Ground Patrol
- Regional Offices: List: San Juan; Arecibo; Aguadilla; Mayaguez; Ponce; Guayama; Humacao

The Puerto Rico Natural Resources Ranger Corps (Spanish: Cuerpo de Vigilantes de Recursos Naturales) is the law enforcement conservation officers for the Commonwealth of Puerto Rico. Its primary mission is to protect endemic plants and animals of Puerto Rico, prevent the introduction of invasive animals and plants and prosecute any person who violates environmental laws.

Its headquarters are located at State Road PR-8838, Km. 6.3, El Cinco neighborhood, in San Juan.

== History ==
Guards Corps was created on June 29, 1977 by Act No.1 SE. The Corps or Rangers are responsible for ensuring the protection of natural resources, monitoring the observance of the laws and regulations that protect the environment, and preventing pollution of the environment. The Corps also serves as the police in all areas under the jurisdiction of the Department of Environment and Natural Resources.

Since 2004 the agency has had 310 rangers and has been unable to train new members due to lack of funds. The rangers of the agency are represented by the Servidores Públicos Unidos de Puerto Rico (United Public Servants of Puerto Rico). Since 2020 the union has requested raises in the salaries of its members. In 2021 the union condemned the inhumane working conditions for workers stationed on Isla de Mona.
