= Dr. Juan A. Rivero Zoo =

Defunct zoo in Mayagüez, Puerto Rico

- Interactive map of Dr. Juan A. Rivero Zoo
- 18.216205°N 67.133085°W
- Date opened: 1954
- Date closed: 2017 (public); 2023 (operations)
- Location: Miradero; Mayagüez, Puerto Rico
- Land area: 45 acres (18 ha)
- No. of species: 75
- Website: Dr. Juan A. Rivero Zoo website (archived)

The Dr. Juan A. Rivero Zoo, officially named the Dr. Juan A. Rivero Zoo of Puerto Rico, also known as the Mayagüez Zoo, was a 45-acre (18 ha) zoological park located in Mayagüez, Puerto Rico, owned by the Government of Puerto Rico and operated by the Department of Natural and Environmental Resources, under the agency of the Company of National Parks of Puerto Rico. It was named in honor of Juan A. Rivero, its first director. It was Puerto Rico's only zoo and had an extensive collection of animals from all continents.

The zoo closed to the public after the impact of Hurricane Maria in 2017 and fully ceased operations in 2023 after much scrutiny in its final years due to questionable health and treatment of their animals. All species were later relocated to sanctuaries across the United States after the closure.

== History ==
The zoo opened in 1954, when legislator Benjamin Cole authored the law that created the zoo, which was named after its founder and first director Dr. Juan A. Rivero. The zoo went through a major upgrade in 2003 with the addition of an aviary, arthropodary and a butterfly exhibition. Committed to animal welfare, especially those facing extinction, the zoo had several conservation programs for the Puerto Rican crested toad, the plain pigeon and the Andean condor.

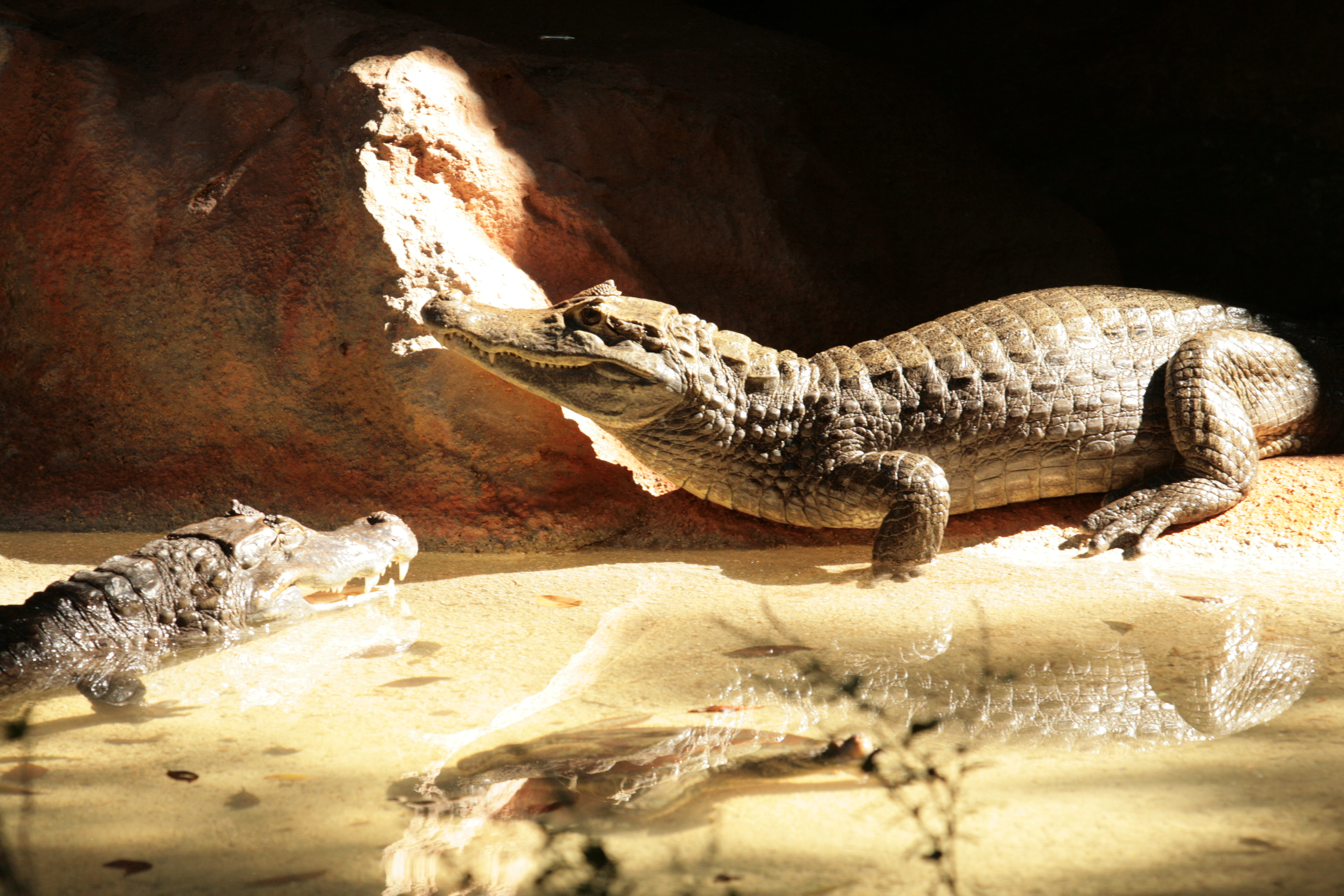
Caimans at the caiman exhibit.

In March 2008 the zoo acquired two new giraffes and two desert warthogs to augment the African collection. The animals were brought from Ohio and Louisiana. The economic crisis related to the government debt crisis in Puerto Rico that began in 2014, led to issues with zoo maintenance and animal care.

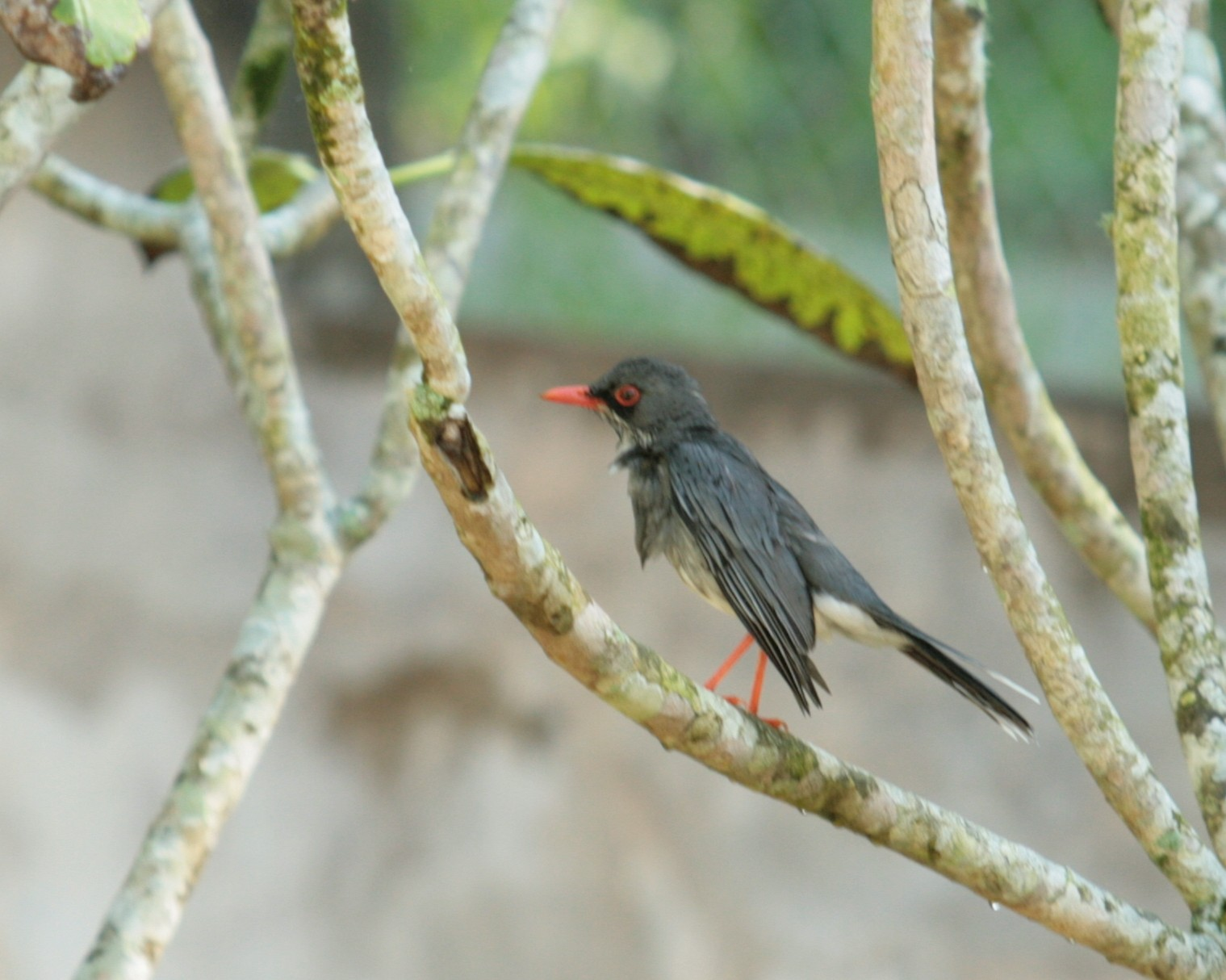
Eastern red-legged thrush at the zoo

Despite the zoo being closed to the public after Hurricane Maria in September 2017, the zoo still had employed zookeepers to care for the animals, including two lion cubs that were born at the zoo in 2019. That same year, volunteer efforts began to help maintain the zoo in preparation for a planned 2021 reopening of the facilities. The following year, in 2020, FEMA had assigned $6.2 million to the zoo for repairs related to the hurricane.

=== Mundi the elephant ===
One of the zoo's most popular and well-known animals was Mundi, a female African savanna elephant, born in the wild in 1982 at Hwange National Park in Zimbabwe. She was rescued among 63 other young African elephant calves through a rescue mission funded by Arthur Jones, after they were left orphaned by the Zimbabwe government, who organized a mass culling. Jones brought the calves to the United States in 1984, including Mundi, and sold them off to circuses and zoos. Mundi was sold off to the Mayagüez Zoo in 1988 after a brutal attack left her blind in one eye and a permanently damaged tusk. She remained in solitary display for 35 years at the time when the zoo was permanently closed in February 2023.

In 2017, plans to relocate Mundi began through Carol Buckley's Elephant Aid International non-profit organization. In 2018, the organization signed a contract with the Government of Puerto Rico to relocate the elephant to Buckley's Elephant Refuge North America sanctuary in Attapulgus, Georgia but the plans were thwarted when the 2019 political scandal erupted and the contract was cancelled. After the zoo ceased operations in February 2023, Mundi was transported and escorted to Rafael Hernández Airport in Aguadilla on May 11, 2023 and flown to Jacksonville, Florida the next day. She was then transported by ground to Buckley's sanctuary, to live the rest of her lifetime with two rescued Asian elephants Tarra, a female, and Bo, a male.

== Decline and closure ==
Within the zoo's final ten years alone, the zoo was cited for several violations of inhumane killings, including a puma, coatimundi, and a baboon that were "not fit for exhibition". Two guinea pigs on exhibition were fed alive to reptiles, and deer on exhibition were fed to big cats after having their jugulars cut without using a humane slaughter method. There were also accounts of the zoo using expired medications and having inadequate vet care. The United States Department of Agriculture investigated the zoo, and did not renew their federal permits.

On May 23, 2022, it was announced that the zoo's male chimpanzee, Magnum, had died at the age of 39. Although the official cause of death given was his advanced age, animal rights activists demanded for his death to be investigated, as they claim he had cardiac ailments for which he received no treatment.

On February 27, 2023, the permanent closure of the zoo was announced, by order of the United States Department of Justice, following much scrutiny due to questionable health and malnourishment of their animals, as well as the treatment they were receiving. The efforts to relocate all species to sanctuaries were completed between February and June 2023, with assistance from the Puerto Rico Natural Resources Ranger Corps, the United States Fish and Wildlife Service and The Wild Animal Sanctuary in Keenesburg, Colorado.
