= Miradero, Mayagüez, Puerto Rico =

Barrio of Puerto Rico

Miradero
- Barrio
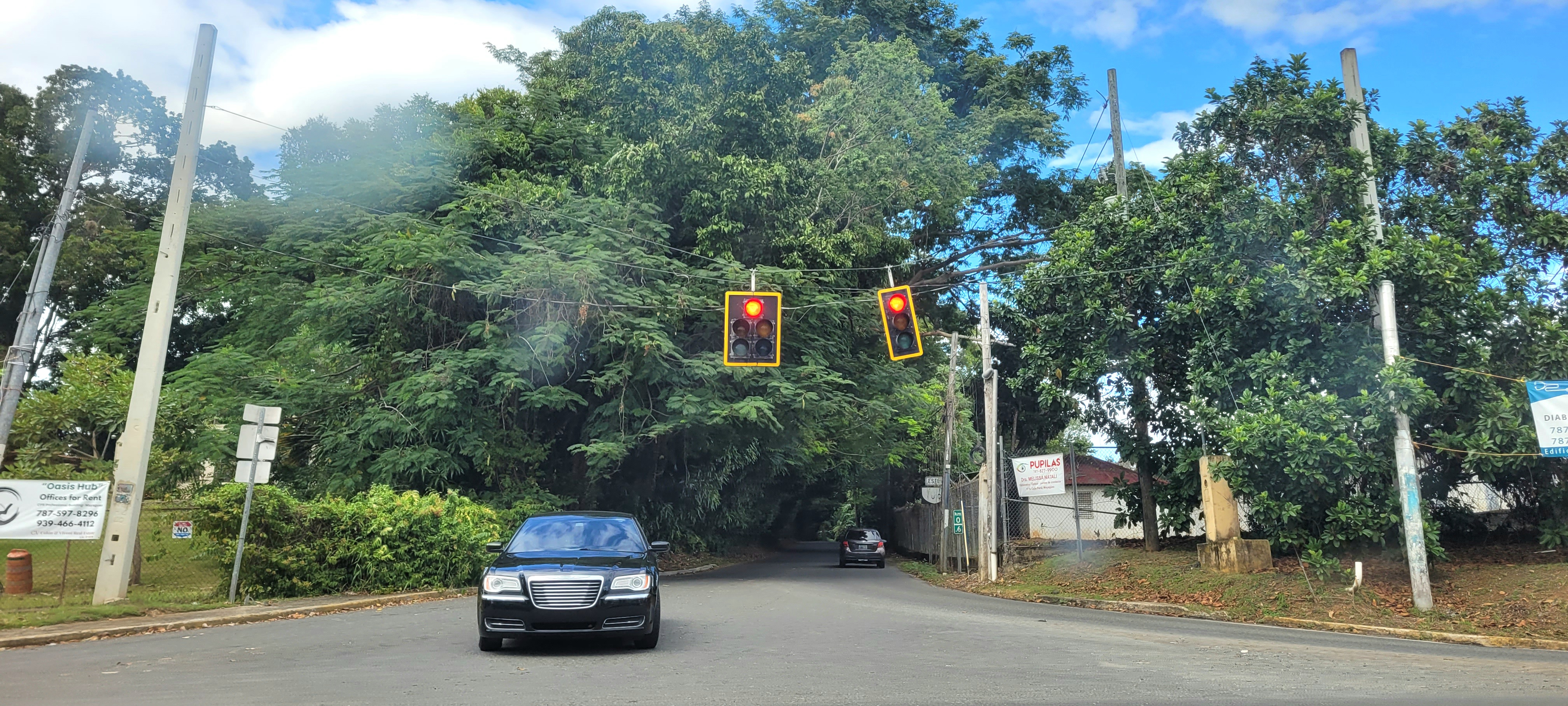
- Puerto Rico Highway 108 between Mayagüez barrio-pueblo and Miradero

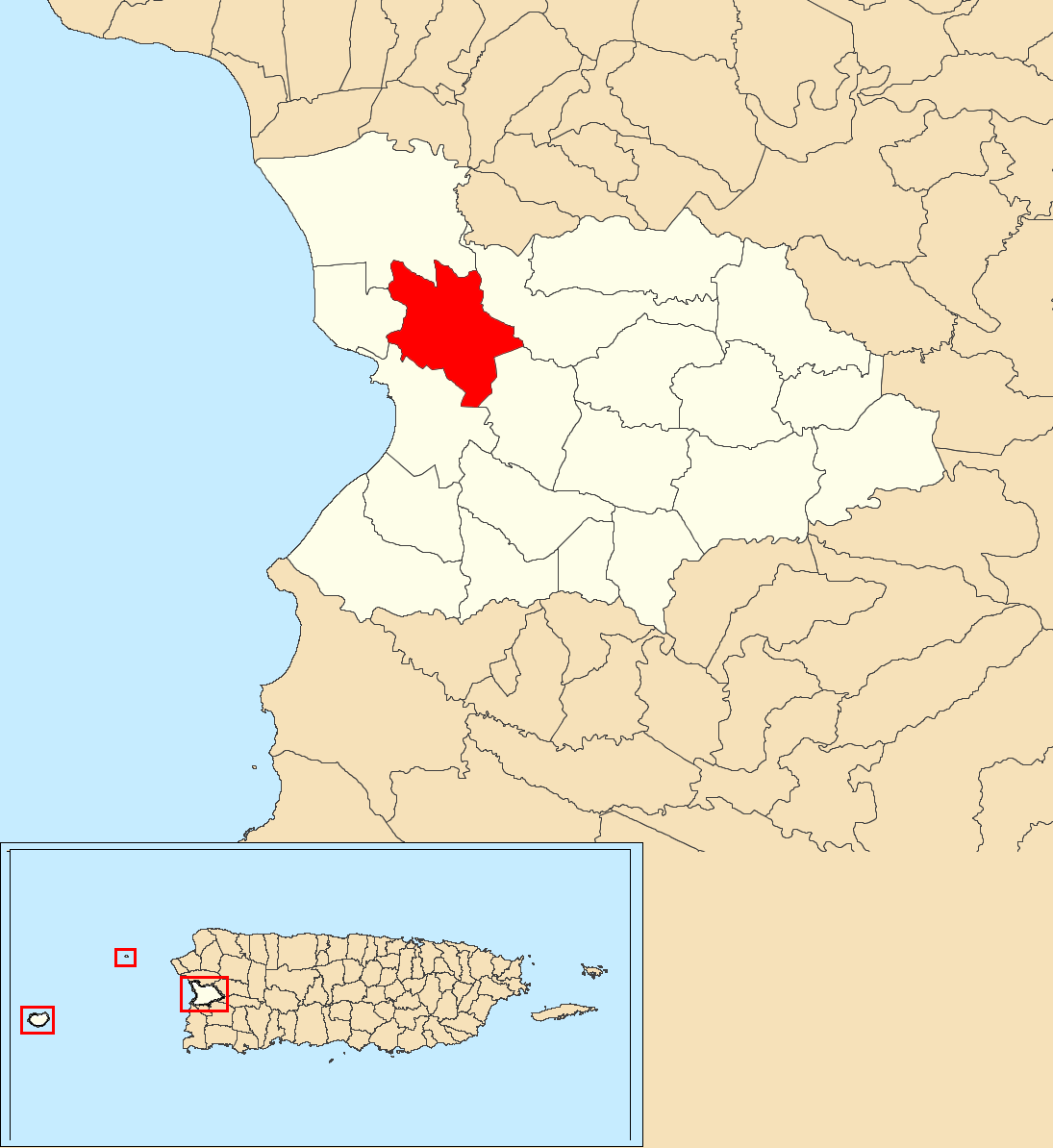
- Location of Miradero within the municipality of Mayagüez shown in red

- Location of Puerto Rico
- Coordinates: 18°13′32″N 67°08′23″W
- Commonwealth: Puerto Rico
- Municipality: Mayagüez

Area
  - Total: 2.93 sq mi (7.6 km^{2})
  - Land: 2.93 sq mi (7.6 km^{2})
  - Water: 0 sq mi (0 km^{2})
- Elevation: 207 ft (63 m)

Population (2010)
  - Total: 5,724
  - Density: 1,953.6/sq mi (754.3/km^{2})
- 2010 census
- Time zone: UTC−4 (AST)

Miradero is a barrio in Mayagüez, Puerto Rico. The US census of 2010 reports a population of 5,724. The total land area the barrio is about 2.9 square miles (7.5 km^{2}). It is one of fifteen rural inland barrios of Mayagüez.

== History ==
Miradero was in Spain's gazetteers until Puerto Rico was ceded by Spain in the aftermath of the Spanish–American War under the terms of the Treaty of Paris of 1898 and became an unincorporated territory of the United States. In 1899, the United States Department of War conducted a census of Puerto Rico finding that the population of Miradero was 1,268.

The name Miradero means vantage point, or (scenic) overlook. The rural barrio of Miradero, today more suburban, next to the city suggests and describes a place to see and admire. The name makes reference to the panoramic vistas of the city of Mayagüez and its bay and the Mona passage. Eugenio María de Hostos grew up in the area, after his birth in the nearby Rio Cañas Arriba barrio.

Historical population
Census	Pop.	Note	%±
1900	1,268		—
1910	1,644		29.7%
1920	1,224		−25.5%
1930	1,365		11.5%
1940	1,701		24.6%
1950	1,549		−8.9%
1960	3,812		146.1%
1970	2,452		−35.7%
1980	4,171		70.1%
1990	5,279		26.6%
2000	5,510		4.4%
2010	5,724		3.9%
U.S. Decennial Census; 1899 (shown as 1900) 1910-1930; 1930-1950 1980-2000 2010

== Notable landmarks ==
Miradero is home to a number of sports complexes such as: Palacio de Recreación y Deportes, Natatorio RUM, RUM Racquetball Courts and the Mayagüez University Campus Tennis Courts. The Dr. Juan A. Rivero Zoo is located in Miradero. There are a number of schools located in the barrio including Southwestern Educational Society and the Academy of the Immaculate Conception (where, among others, Jose Juan Barea attended most grades except his senior high school year).

A venture capital fund local to Puerto Rico, named Miradero Capital Partners, Inc., is named after the subsection.

== See also ==
- List of communities in Puerto Rico
