= Puerto Rico Highway 2 =

Highway in Puerto Rico

Highway 2
- Ruta 2
- PR-2 highlighted in red

Route information
- Maintained by Puerto Rico DTPW
- Length: 230.2 km (143.0 mi)
- Existed: Late 1940s–present

Major junctions
- From: PR-1 / PR-133 in San Antón
- PR-9 / PR-52 in Canas; PR-100 in Guanajibo; PR-111 / PR-1107 in Victoria; PR-22 in Carrizales; PR-10 in Arecibo barrio-pueblo; PR-149 in Coto Norte; PR-165 in Media Luna; PR-5 in Bayamón barrio-pueblo; PR-22 in Pueblo Viejo; PR-1 in Santurce
- To: PR-26 in Santurce

Location
- Country: United States
- Territory: Puerto Rico
- Municipalities: Ponce, Peñuelas, Guayanilla, Yauco, Guánica, Sabana Grande, San Germán, Hormigueros, Mayagüez, Añasco, Aguada, Aguadilla, Moca, Isabela, Quebradillas, Camuy, Hatillo, Arecibo, Barceloneta, Manatí, Vega Baja, Vega Alta, Dorado, Toa Baja, Bayamón, Guaynabo, San Juan

Highway system
- Roads in Puerto Rico; List
← PR-1	→ PR-3
← PR-200R	PR-2R	→ PR-3R

Puerto Rico Highway 2 (PR-2) is a road in Puerto Rico that connects the cities of San Juan and Ponce. At 156 miles (230 km) long, it is Puerto Rico's longest singled-signed highway.

The road runs counter-clockwise from San Juan to Ponce. PR-2 runs parallel to the northern coast of Puerto Rico (west of San Juan), then parallel to the west coast from near Aguadilla running south through Mayagüez. Shortly after Mayagüez, the road runs somewhat inland (through Hormigueros, San Germán and Sabana Grande) until it reaches the southern coast of Puerto Rico at Yauco, and continues to run parallel the southern shore as it approaches Ponce from the west. In addition to Arecibo, Aguadilla, and Mayagüez, the road runs through various other cities including Guaynabo, Bayamón, San Germán and Yauco. In some sections the road is a four-lane highway while in other sections the road is either a six-lane or eight-lane highway.

The section of PR-2 from Ponce to the PR-22 interchange in Hatillo forms part of the unsigned Interstate Highway PRI-2. PRI-2 originally included the entire route of PR-2 until the construction of PR-22, which has since been assigned the PRI-2 designation from its western terminus in Hatillo to its eastern terminus in San Juan.

== Route description ==
=== San Juan to Hatillo ===
Puerto Rico Highway 2 starts off in San Juan as an 8-lane road and heads west roughly parallel to the northern shore of the island. It makes its way through the Caparra section of San Juan, intersecting with Route 22, which provides access to San Juan's Santurce ward and to the cities of Carolina and Caguas. Heading west, PR-2 traverses the cities of Guaynabo and Bayamon as a heavily used road. In addition to numerous residential communities, PR-2 also provides access to malls, movie theaters, restaurants, hospitals, and various colleges and universities, among other facilities in this area.

The road then serves the towns of Toa Baja, Dorado, and Vega Baja and Vega Alta. In these areas the road experiences heavy traffic. Continuing west, Puerto Rico Highway 2 next serves the industrial towns of Manatí and Barceloneta providing access to several pharmaceutical companies, among other sources of employment outside the agricultural sector. In this area the road is also the main road to intersections leading to the beaches of Los Tubos, Mar Chiquita, Tortuguero, Puerto de las Vacas, and Las Criollas.

The next major city on the road is Arecibo. On PR-2, in the eastern part of Arecibo is the longest bridge in Puerto Rico. PR-2 also intersects with PR-10 for access to the interior of the island as well as Ponce on the southern shore. After Arecibo the road then makes its way to the town of Hatillo where it meets with the current western terminus of the new PR-22 expressway.

Puerto Rico Highway 2

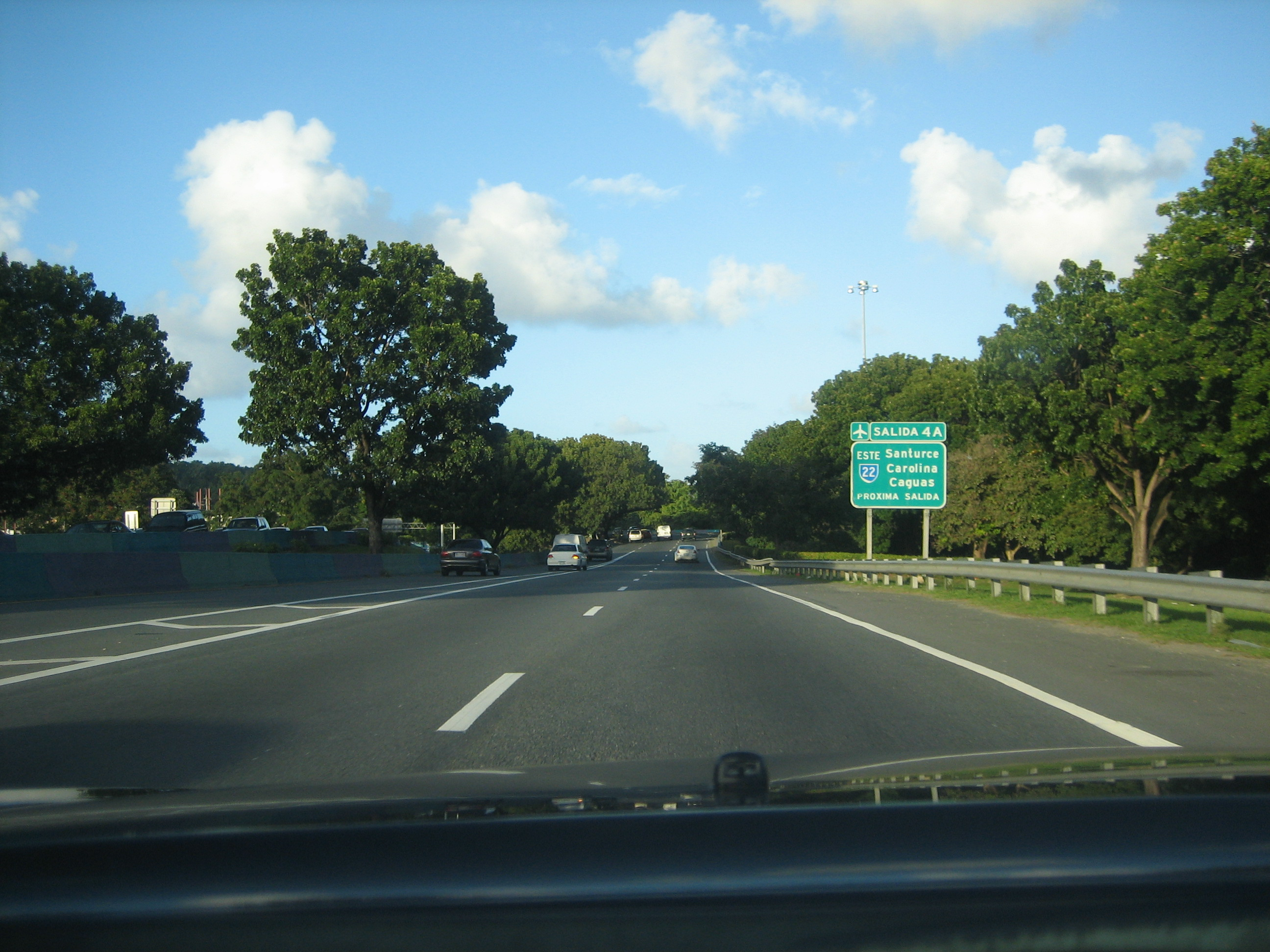
Heading east from Caparra to San Juan

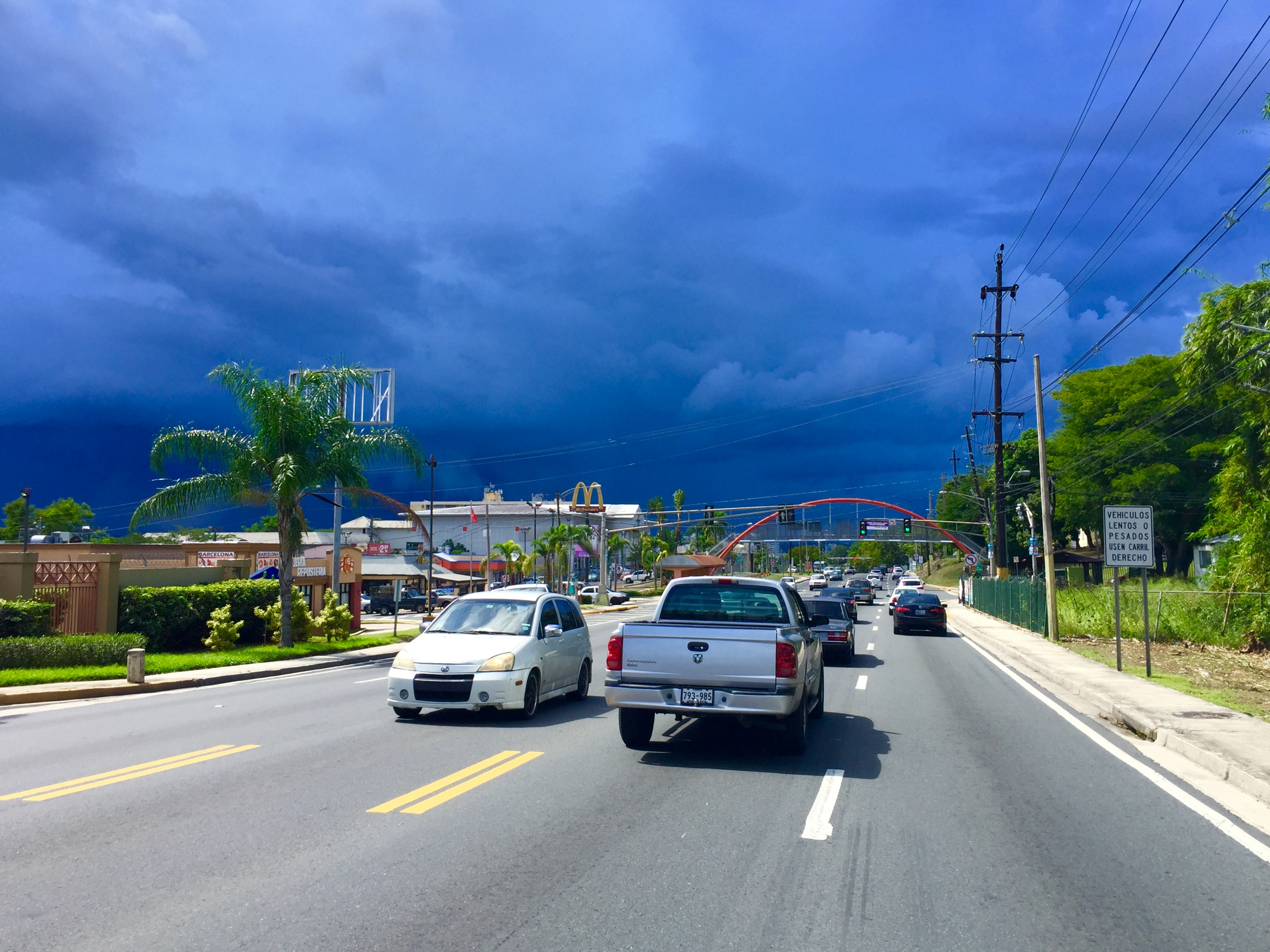
Heading west from Caparra to Bayamón

=== Hatillo to Mayagüez ===
Puerto Rico Highway 2

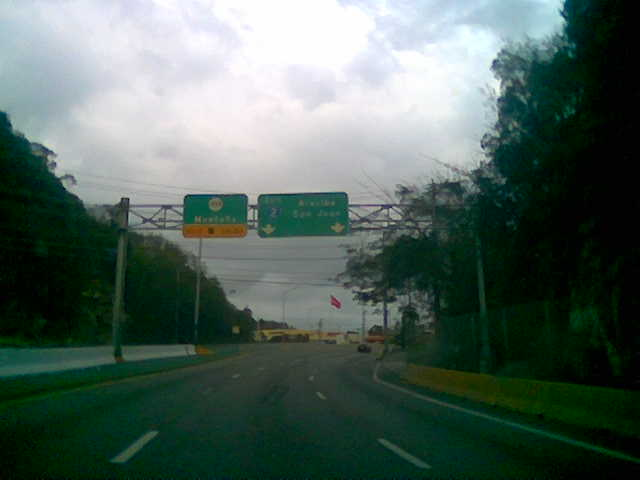
Heading east in Aguadilla

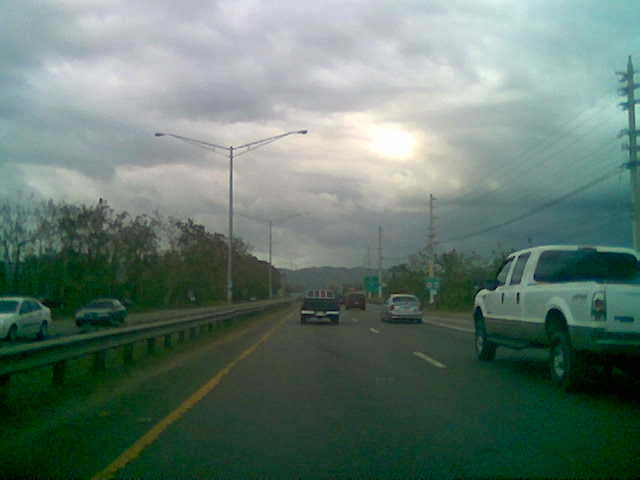
Heading north in Mayagüez

West of its interchange with PR-22 in Hatillo, PR-2 becomes a primary road and meets several important highways that serve the center of the island such as PR-119, PR-110 and PR-112. This stretch of the highway contains a multitude of traffic lights. Following Hatillo the roads traverses the towns of Camuy, Quebradillas and Isabela. At Isabela, PR-2 provides access to roads leading to various beaches, including Blue Hole, Guajataca, and Jobos.

In the city of Aguadilla, PR-2 turns south at its intersection with PR-107, on its course towards the western city and seaport of Mayagüez. In this area Puerto Rico Highway 2 provides access to Aguadilla's Rafael Hernandez airport, as well as to various area beach resorts. The trip from Aguadilla to Mayagüez takes about 30 minutes, and PR-2 has fewer traffic lights in this stretch of the road than those experienced so far anywhere from its San Juan terminus starting point.

=== Mayagüez to Hormigueros ===
PR-2 is a major 6-lane highway in Mayagüez, which is one of the major cities in Puerto Rico. It intersect with PR-102 and PR-64, which serve as by-pass routes. The farm to market PR-102 highway also has access to PR-2 through the new Puerto Rico Highway 63, another important intersection of Puerto Rico Highway 2. As it traverses the city of Mayagüez, PR-2 is the main road for access to the University of Puerto Rico at Mayagüez and the Mayagüez Zoo. Also, further south, PR-2 provides access to the Mayagüez Mall, which is Puerto Rico's third largest shopping center and several medical facilities. The road then continues south through the municipality of Hormigueros.

=== Hormigueros to Ponce ===
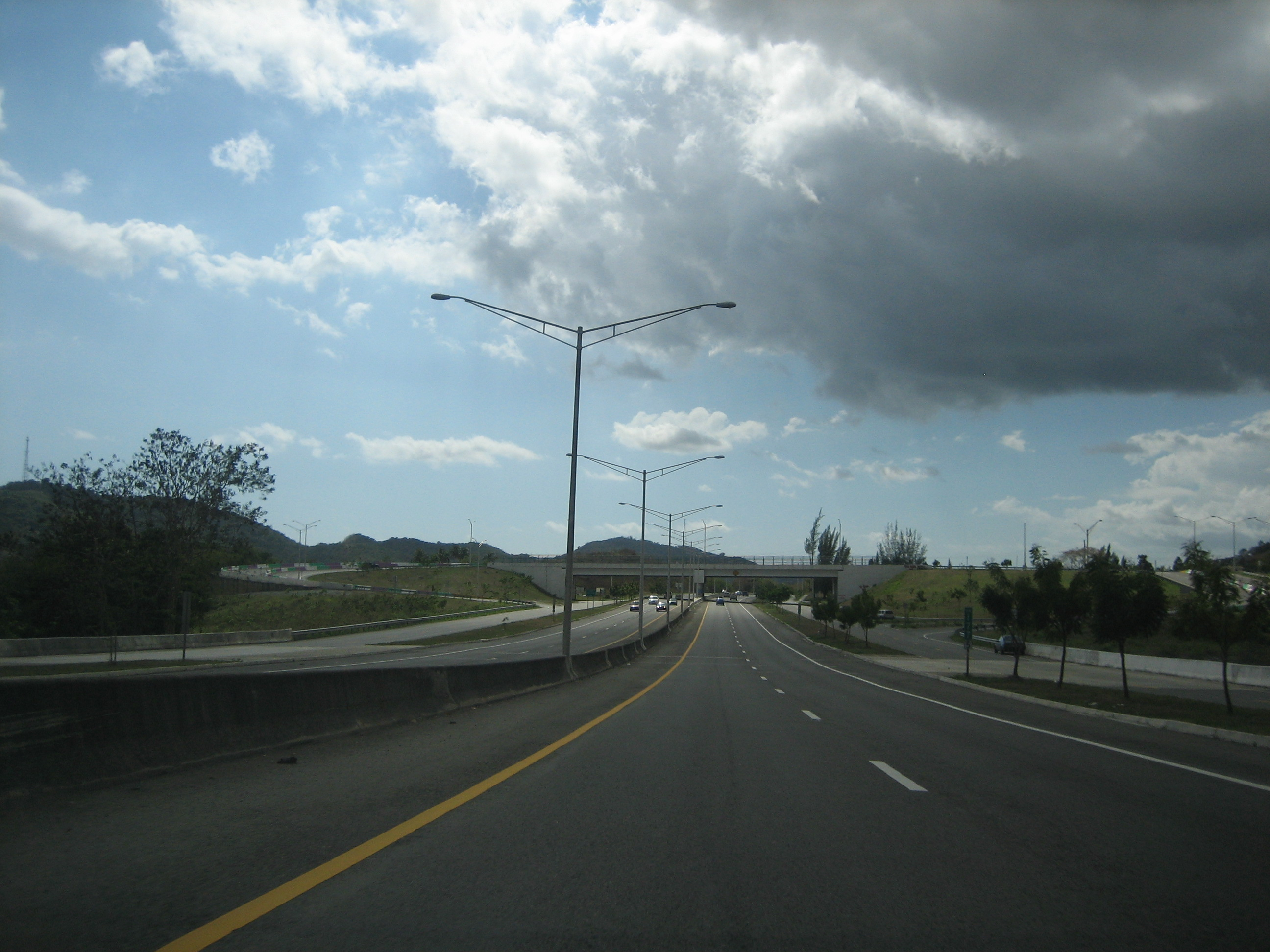
PR-2 as a freeway in San Germán. Continues this way until Ponce

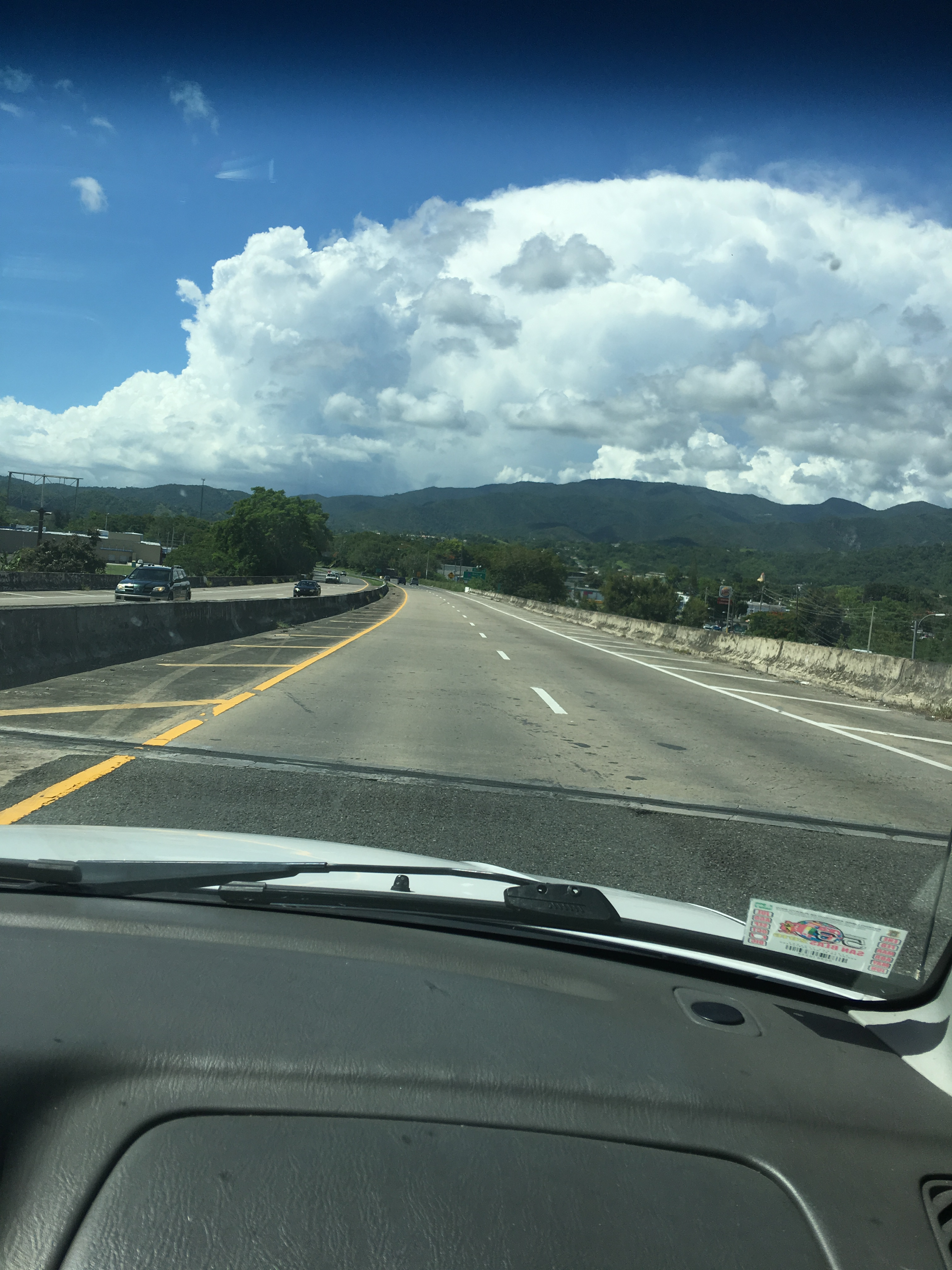
PR-2 west in Sabana Grande

Heading southeastward passed Hormigueros, PR-2 becomes a four-lane controlled-access freeway in its way to Ponce. It has several exits in the municipalities of San Germán, Sabana Grande, Guánica, Yauco, Guayanilla and Peñuelas. In this agricultural section, PR-2 provides access to some of Puerto Rico's southern beaches, such as Boquerón. The road is also within a few minutes' drive from the Guánica Dry Forest state park.

As the road makes its way through the hills of Peñuelas' barrio Tallaboa, the ruins of the abandoned 1970s CORCO oil refinery as well as its PPG supplier are visible to the right. Puerto Rico Highway 2 provides access to many rural communities in this stretch of the road. As it approaches Ponce, PR-2 becomes an 8-lane divided highway again. Before its entry to the municipality of Ponce, Peñón de Ponce is a prominent promontory to the left of the road while El Tuque beach will be visible to the right. There are also various hotels in the area. In the Las Cucharas section of this area, there is also a good selection of restaurants by the shore, serving mostly seafood. Construction of the Ponce-to-Peñuelas stretch of PR-2 was completed in the early 1960s after construction work that began with the building of bridges over Río Matilde, Río Portugués, and Río Bucaná.

=== Ponce ===
Puerto Rico Highway 2 in Ponce

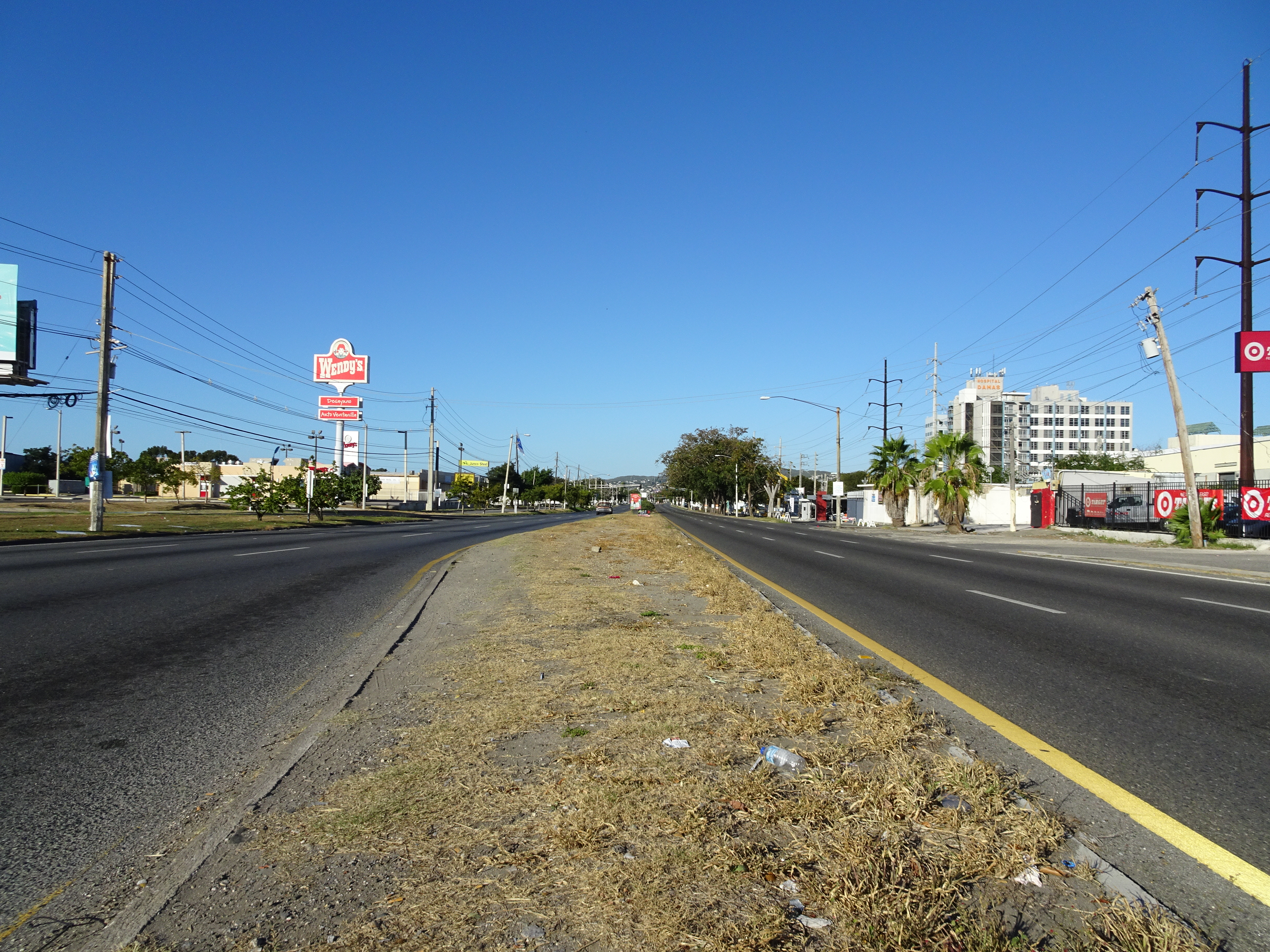
Heading west in Barrio Playa

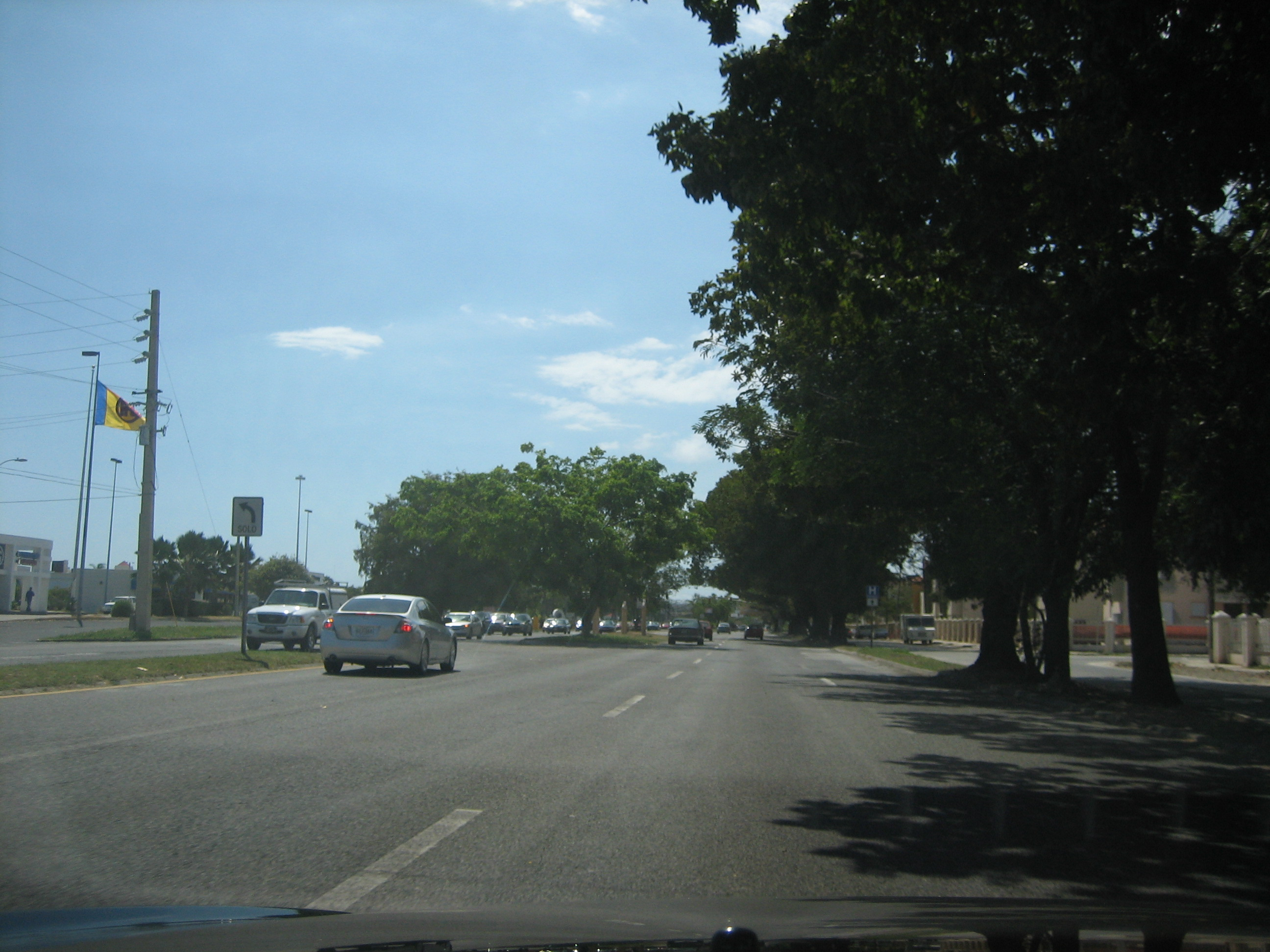
Heading west in Barrio San Antón

Map of the southern terminus of PR-2 in the municipality of Ponce

The road is an 8-lane divided highway in its western approach to Ponce. After its intersection with the PR-52 expressway, the road becomes a 6-lane at-grade roadway in the city of Ponce. It provides access to barrios Canas, Playa, Canas Urbano, San Antón, Bucaná, and Sabanetas. It provides access to four of Ponce's beaches, to the Damas and Dr. Pila hospitals, to various shopping plazas including the Plaza del Caribe Mall and Centro del Sur Mall, the Puerto Rico Judicial Center, the University of Puerto Rico at Ponce, the Mercedita Airport, and numerous restaurants and other facilities. The PR-2 segment corresponding to the city of Ponce was built in the late 1940s and is known as the "Ponce By-Pass", since it was used to "bypass" the urban and commercial city center when traveling due east from western towns such as Guayanilla, Yauco, San Germán, and Mayagüez, to towns in eastern Puerto Rico such as Salinas, Guayama, Cayey, Caguas, and San Juan. The section of PR-2 between Guayanilla and Ponce opened in 1965.

As the road makes its way through the city of Ponce, it is also known as the Ponce Bypass. The Ponce Bypass intersects with seven major roads: PR-2R (Carretera Pámpanos), with access to the Estadio Francisco Montaner; PR-585 (Avenida Eduardo Ruberté), which leads to barrio Playa; PR-123 (Avenida Hostos), leading to the Museo de Arte de Ponce and historic downtown Ponce; PR-12 (Avenida Santiago de los Caballeros), leading to La Guancha Boardwalk and the Port of the Americas; and PR-163 (Avenida Julio Enrique Monagas) leading to Julio Enrique Monagas Family Park and Museo de Arte de Ponce. The road's last intersection in Ponce as well as its western terminus is at its intersection with PR-133 westbound (Calle Comercio, a.k.a. Avenida Ednita Nazario) and PR-1 eastbound (Avenida La Ceiba). PR-133 heads west to Ceiba Tree Park and PR-1 heads east to Mercedita Airport. After this dual intersection at PR-133/PR-1 the road seamlessly becomes a 4-lane thoroughfare called Miguel A. Pou Boulevard, the city's main artery into the Ponce Historic Zone.

=== Municipalities served ===
PR-2 runs through 26 municipalities. Cataño, Rincón, Cabo Rojo and Lajas are the only coastal municipalities in Puerto Rico (west of San Juan and Ponce) that PR-2 does not pass in the way from San Juan to Ponce, though PR-2 is less than one mile from the limits between Hormigueros and Cabo Rojo at its intersection with PR-100. PR-2 passes through a small segment of the municipality of Guánica, only slightly over a mile long. PR-2 also passes near Moca in the vicinity of Aguadilla, less than a mile away.

The following are the municipalities through which PR-2 runs, in counterclockwise from San Juan to Ponce:

- San Juan
- Guaynabo
- Bayamón
- Toa Baja
- Dorado
- Vega Alta
- Vega Baja
- Manatí
- Barceloneta
- Arecibo
- Hatillo
- Camuy
- Quebradillas
- Isabela
- Moca
- Aguadilla
- Aguada
- Añasco
- Mayagüez
- Hormigueros
- San Germán
- Sabana Grande
- Guánica
- Yauco
- Guayanilla
- Peñuelas
- Ponce

== History ==
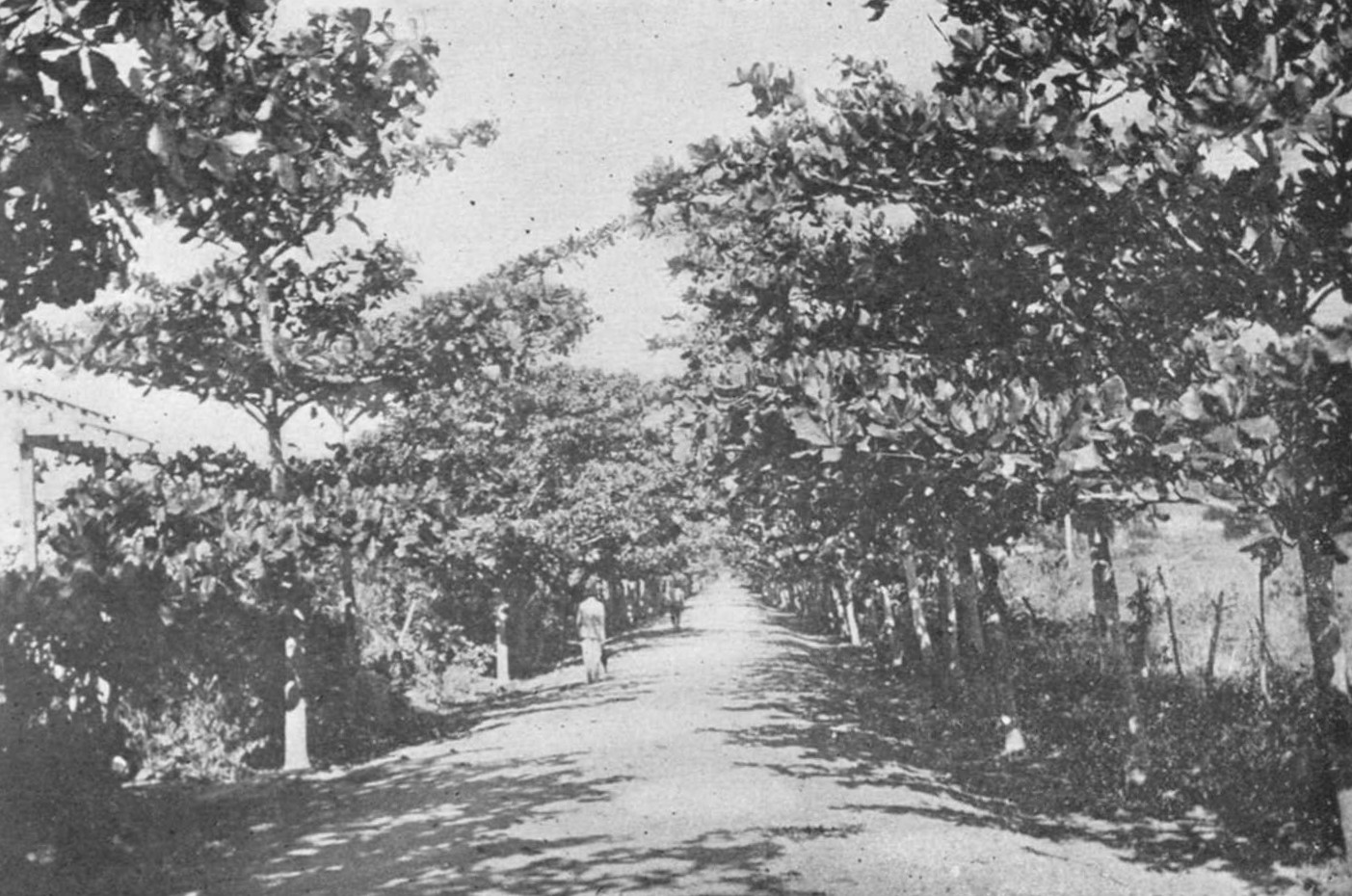
Old stretch of PR-2 between Añasco and Mayagüez

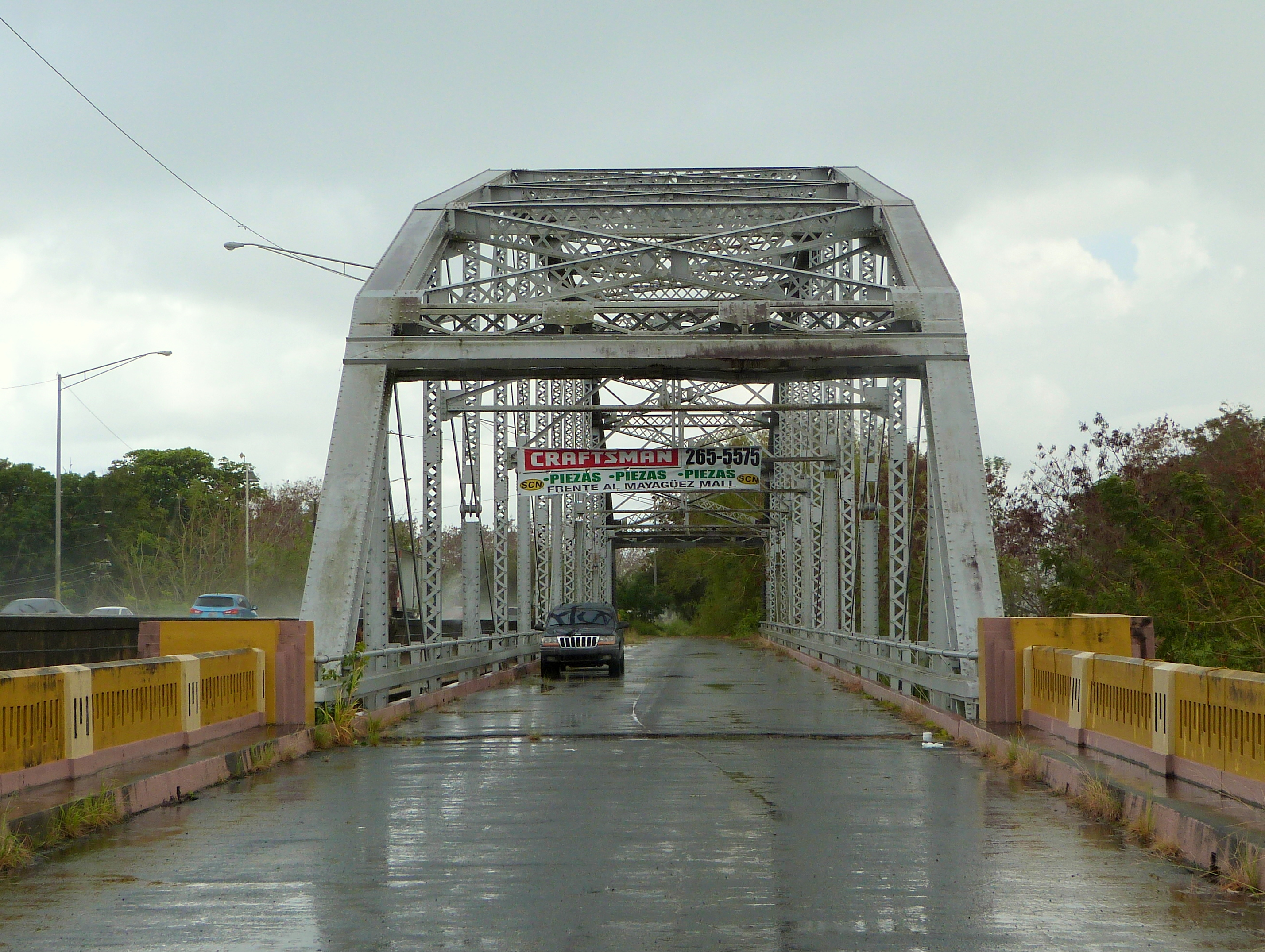
Puente de Añasco between Añasco and Mayagüez

PR-2 has been in use for many decades. It was initially a 2-lane road. It experienced enhancements throughout the years. In the northern coast of the island, the need for a better road was addressed with the construction of PR-22, a new 4-lane road parallel to PR-2.

In the southern and southwestern part of the island, this need was addressed by improvements to the exiting PR-2 road, which was already a 4-lane road. In this stretch, during the mid 2000s to early 2010s, the Puerto Rico Department of Transportation and Public Works (DTOP) converted most segments of PR-2 between Mayagüez and Ponce into a limited access expressway. The segment between Hormigueros and San German, in particular, suffered from several at-grade intersections that slowed down travel time considerably. In an effort to increase the controlled access, freeway-style character of the highway, all at-grade intersections were either replaced by overpasses or eliminated altogether. The last intersection to be converted was PR-2's intersection with PR-345 in Hormigueros.

As for the western section of PR-2, the DTOP has also eyed the stretch between Mayaguez to Aguadilla for conversion into a freeway. This would occur between the future western terminus of Puerto Rico Highway 22 in Aguadilla to the Mayaguez city limits. The PR-22 extension to Aguadilla was planned for completion in 2016, and freeway conversion of the Aguadilla-to-Mayaguez segment of PR-2 was slanted to begin shortly afterward.

=== Improvements and PR-22 ===
Due to the high population density on the northern coast of Puerto Rico, a new, limited access expressway, PR-22 (also known as Autopista José de Diego), was built parallel to highway PR-2. The goal was to reduce congestion on highway PR-2. Highway PR-22 has several exits that provide access to highway PR-2. Highway PR-22 ends in the municipality of Hatillo, just west of the city of Arecibo. In Hatillo, highway PR-2 meets highway PR-22. During its entire length, from San Juan to Hatillo, the two highways run parallel with each other. Plans are in place to extend PR-22 to Aguadilla.

== Major intersections ==
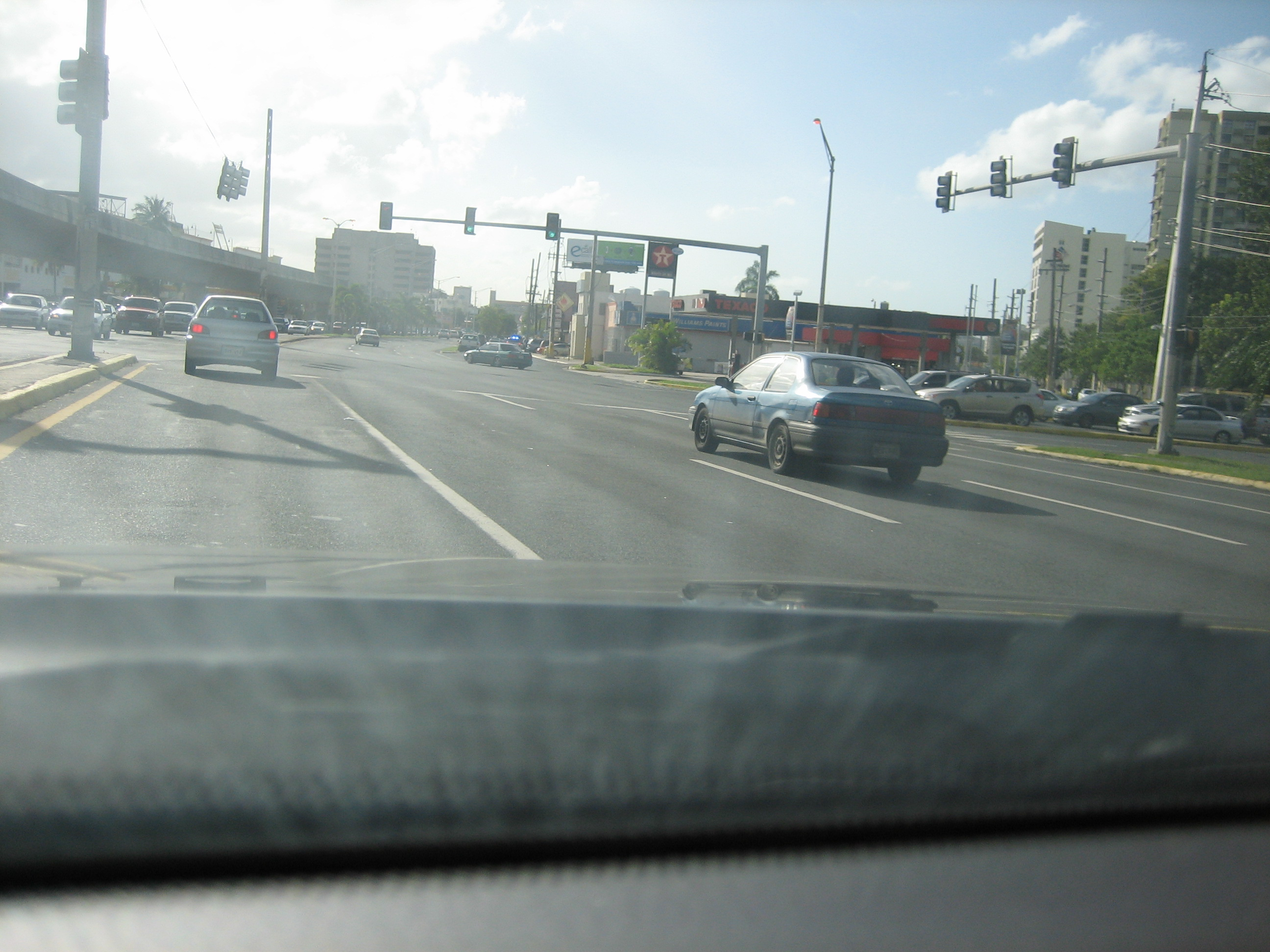
PR-2 west at PR-8855 intersection in Bayamón

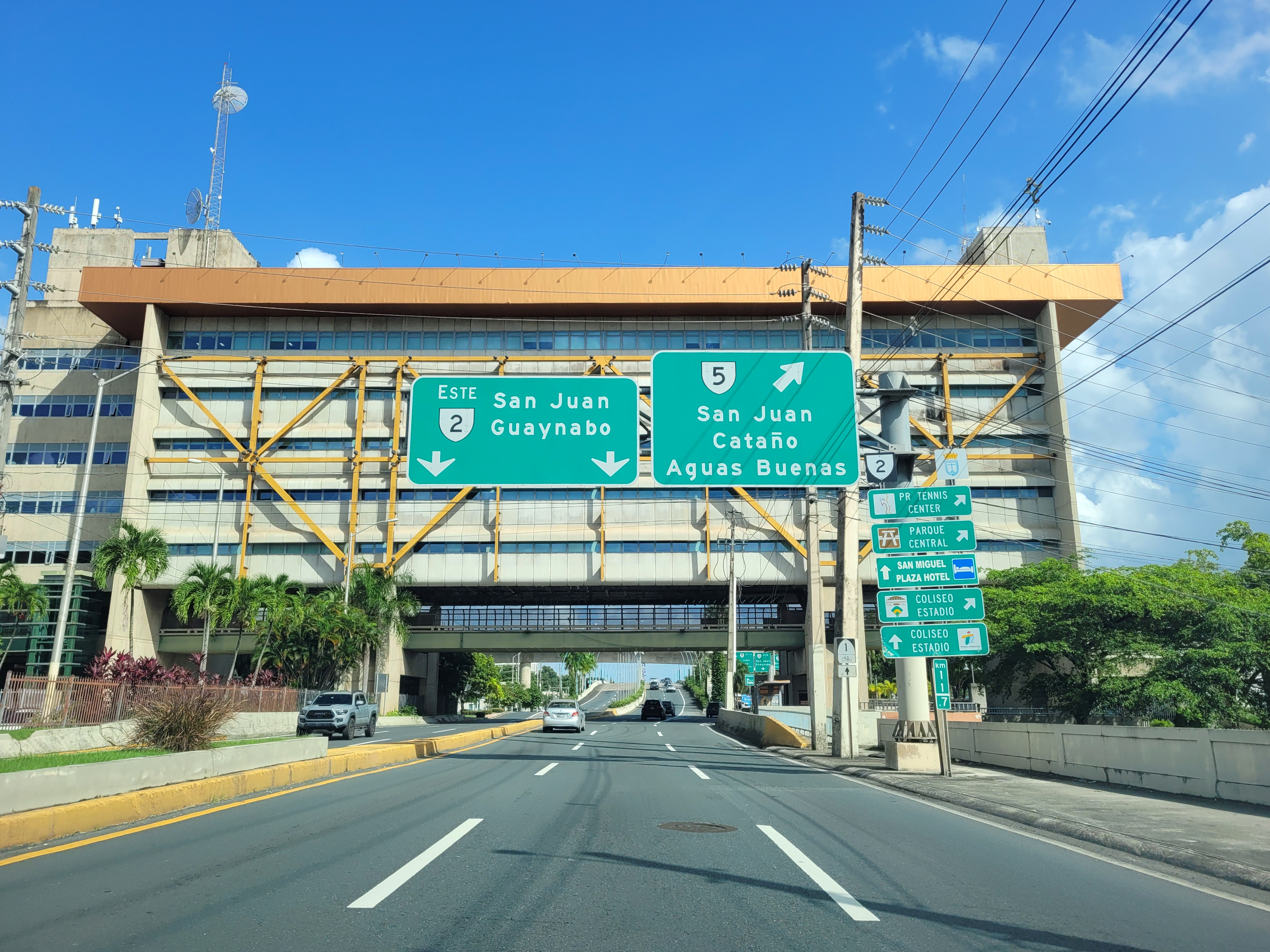
PR-2 east approaching PR-5 interchange in Bayamón

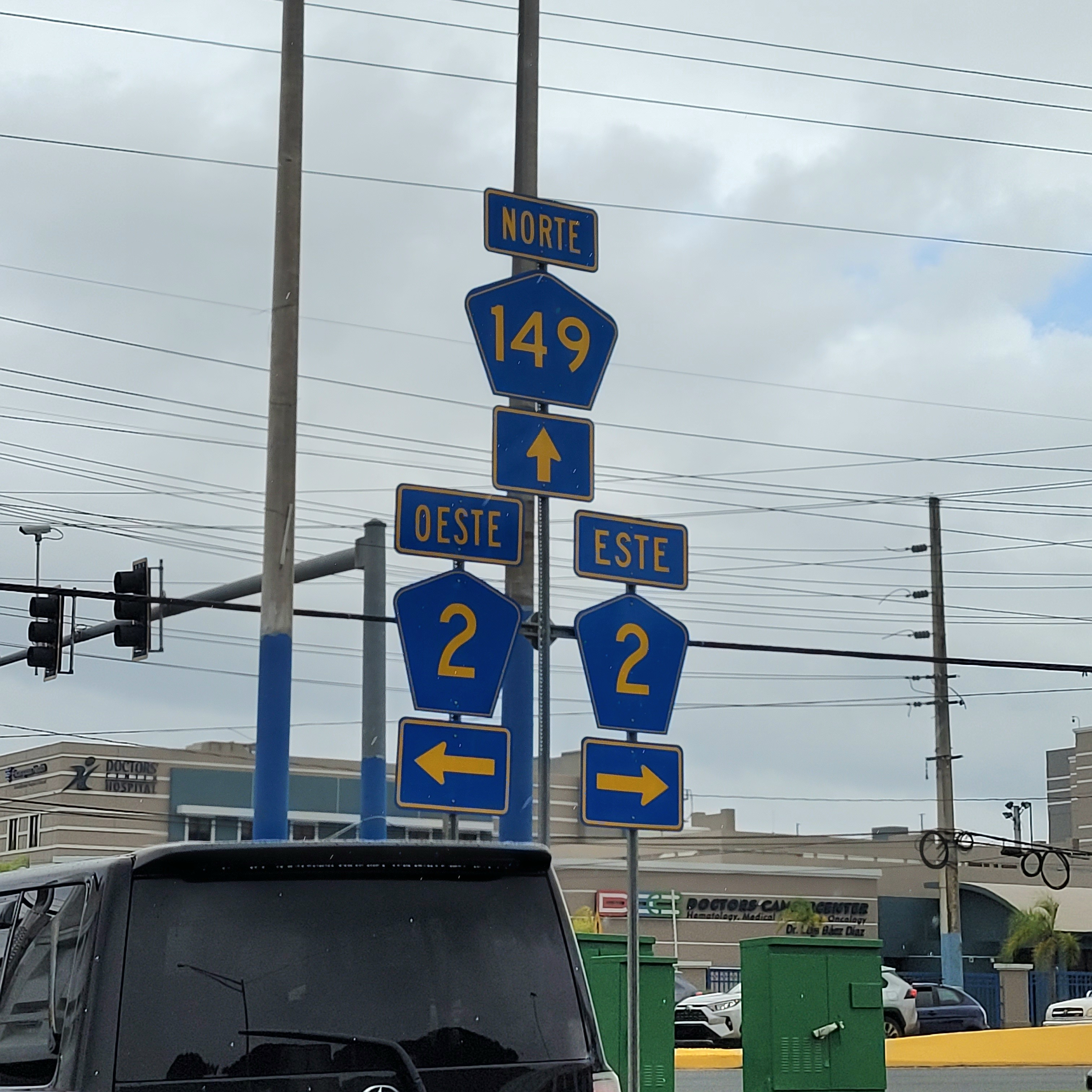
PR-149 north at PR-2 junction in Manatí

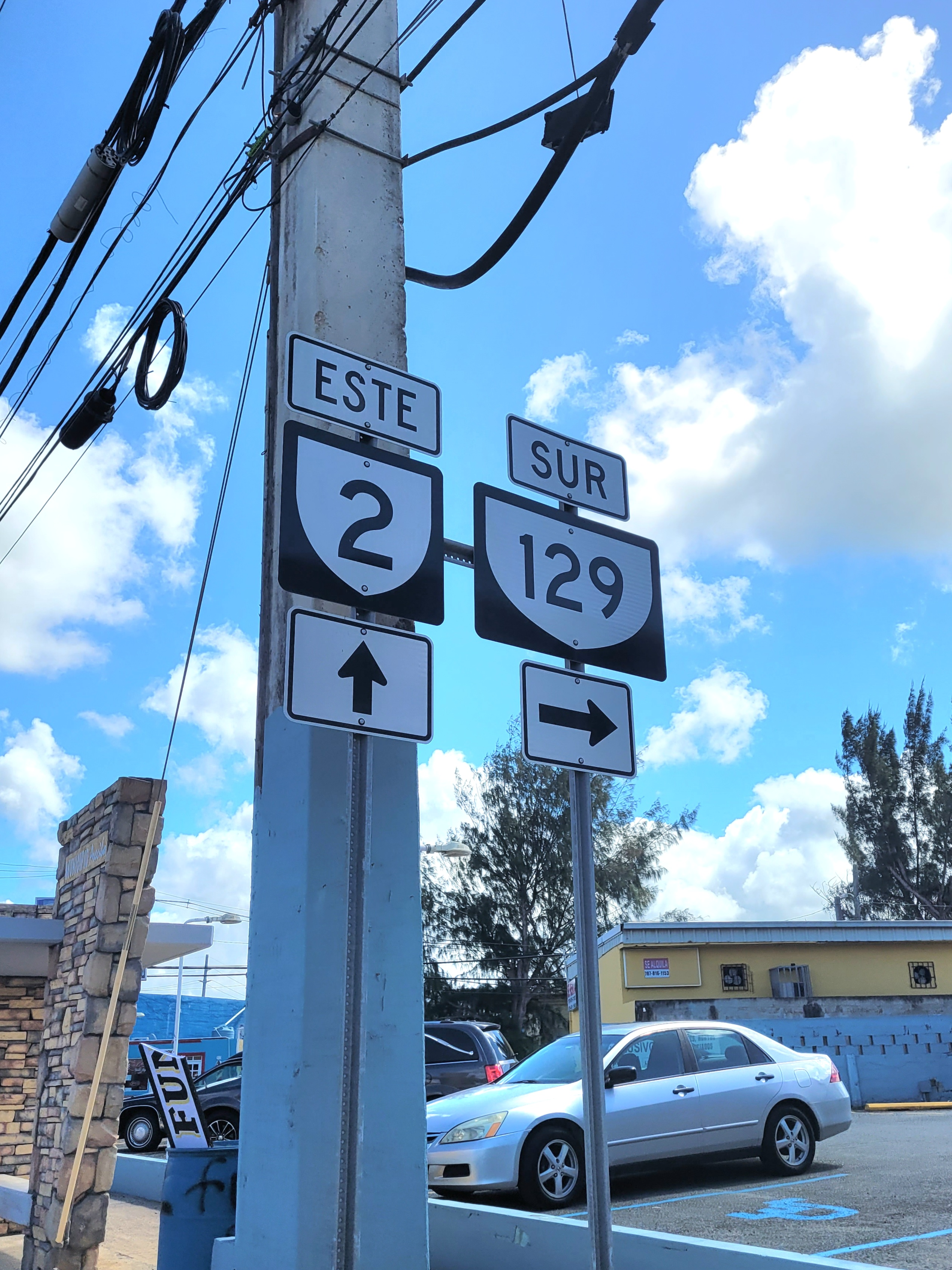
PR-2 east at the northern terminus of PR-129 in Arecibo

Municipality	Location	km	mi	Exit	Destinations	Notes
Ponce	San Antón	230.2	143.0		PR-1 / PR-133 west (Avenida Ednita Nazario) to PR-52 (Autopista Luis A. Ferré) – Ponce, San Juan	Clockwise terminus of PR-2; PR-52 exit 101A
Ponce	San Antón	229.5– 229.4	142.6– 142.5		PR-163 north (Avenida Julio Enrique Monagas) – Ponce	
Ponce	San Antón	228.7	142.1		PR-12 (Avenida Santiago de los Caballeros) to PR-52 (Autopista Luis A. Ferré) – Ponce, San Juan, Juana Díaz	PR-52 exit 104A; diamond interchange
Ponce	Playa	227.7	141.5		PR-123 (Avenida Eugenio María de Hostos) – Ponce	
Ponce	Canas Urbano–Playa line	226.1– 226.0	140.5– 140.4		PR-585 (Avenida Eduardo Ruberté Bisó) – Ponce	
Ponce	Canas Urbano–Playa line	225.7– 225.6	140.2– 140.2		PR-2R north (Carretera Pámpanos) / PR-5549 – Ponce	
Ponce	Canas	224.9	139.7	—	PR-9 north (Avenida Baramaya) – Ponce	Western terminus of Ponce Bypass; eastern terminus of Expreso Roberto Sánchez Vilella; partial cloverleaf interchange
Ponce	Canas	224.6	139.6	224	PR-52 north (Autopista Luis A. Ferré) – San Juan, Santa Isabel, Playa	
Peñuelas	Encarnación	214.5	133.3	214	PR-127 – Tallaboa Poniente	Partial cloverleaf interchange
Peñuelas	Tallaboa Saliente	213.2– 213.1	132.5– 132.4	213	PR-385 (Desvío Ángel Miguel Candelario Arce) – Peñuelas	Partial cloverleaf interchange
Guayanilla	Magas	206.9	128.6	207	PR-127 – Guayanilla, Magas	Diamond interchange
Guayanilla	Jaguas	204.8	127.3	205	PR-132 north (Carretera Juan C. Torres Irizarry) / PR-136 (Avenida Pedro Albizu Campos) – Guayanilla, Peñuelas	Diamond interchange
Yauco	Jácana	199.6	124.0	200	PR-359 (Carretera General Mihiel Gilormini Pacheco) – Yauco, Cambalache	Diamond interchange
Yauco	Susúa Baja	198.1	123.1	198	PR-128 (Avenida Pedro Albizu Campos) / PR-3334 – Yauco	Diamond interchange
Guánica	Susúa Baja	194.3– 194.2	120.7– 120.7	194	PR-116 south (Avenida Manuel "Pito" Pagán Ramírez) – Guánica, Lajas, Parguera	Trumpet interchange
Sabana Grande	Rayo	186.4– 186.3	115.8– 115.8	187	PR-117 – Lajas, Parguera	Diamond interchange
Sabana Grande	Rayo	183.0	113.7	183	To PR-121 (Avenida Vicente Quilinche) / PR-Calle Martínez Vega – Sabana Grande	Diamond interchange
San Germán	Minillas	180.5	112.2	181	PR-102 – Sabana Grande	Diamond interchange
San Germán	Caín Alto	175.1– 175.0	108.8– 108.7	174	PR-122 south (Avenida Ángel Casto Pérez) – San Germán, Lajas, Parguera	Partial cloverleaf interchange
San Germán	Caín Bajo	173.0– 172.9	107.5– 107.4	172	PR-119 – Maricao, Las Marías	Western terminus of Expreso Roberto Sánchez Vilella; southeastern terminus of Expreso Eugenio María de Hostos; diamond interchange
Hormigueros	Hormigueros barrio-pueblo	163.5	101.6	163–162	PR-309 / PR-319 south – Hormigueros	
Hormigueros	Guanajibo	161.2	100.2	161	PR-100 south (Avenida Antonio J. "Tony" Fas Alzamora) – Cabo Rojo	Trumpet interchange
Hormigueros	Guanajibo	160.4	99.7		PR-343 – Hormigueros	
Mayagüez	Sábalos	158.2– 158.1	98.3– 98.2		PR-114 south (Avenida Santa Teresa Jornet) / PR-239 north (Calle Ramón Emeterio Betances) – Mayagüez	
Mayagüez	Mayagüez barrio-pueblo	156.2– 156.1	97.1– 97.0		PR-63 west (Avenida William C. Dunscombe) – Joyuda	
Mayagüez	Mayagüez barrio-pueblo	153.8	95.6		PR-239 south (Bulevar Alfonso Valdés Cobián) – Mayagüez	Former PR-2R
Mayagüez	Mayagüez barrio-pueblo–Miradero line	152.9– 152.8	95.0– 94.9		PR-3108 east (Paseo Juan Mari Brás) – Algarrobos, Miradero	Northwestern terminus of Expreso Eugenio María de Hostos; southern terminus of Expreso Miguel A. García Méndez
Mayagüez	Mayagüez barrio-pueblo	152.5	94.8		PR-102 – Zona Portuaria	No left turn from PR-2 southbound; no access across PR-2
Mayagüez	Algarrobos	151.1– 151.0	93.9– 93.8		PR-104 (Carretera Dr. Victoriano Quintana Muñiz) – Algarrobos	
Mayagüez	Sabanetas	149.0	92.6		PR-64 (Avenida Alcalde Benjamín Cole Vázquez) / PR-342 – El Maní, Miradero, Sabanetas	
Río Grande de Añasco		146.4– 146.3	91.0– 90.9	Puente Salcedo		
Añasco	Añasco Abajo	145.7– 145.6	90.5– 90.5		PR-109 east / PR-115 west (Avenida Profesor Tomás Bonilla Feliciano) – Añasco, Rincón	Northern terminus of Expreso Miguel A. García Méndez; southwestern terminus of Expreso Rafael Hernández, "El Jibarito"
Añasco	Caracol	143.1	88.9		PR-402 – Añasco, Rincón	
Añasco	Quebrada Larga	141.3	87.8		PR-110 (Carretera Pedro "Don Pello" Acevedo Hernández) – Marías	
Aguada	Guanábano	134.4	83.5		PR-417 – Aguada, Naranjo	
Aguadilla	Victoria	130.5	81.1	130	PR-111 east (Carretera Enrique Laguerre) / PR-1107 north (Avenida Victoria) to PR-115 (Avenida Profesor Tomás Bonilla Feliciano) – Aguadilla, Aguada, Moca	Partial cloverleaf interchange
Aguadilla	Caimital Bajo	127.6	79.3	128	PR-2 Spur west (Avenida San Carlos) – Aguadilla	Trumpet interchange
Aguadilla	Caimital Bajo	125.8	78.2		PR-107 north (Carretera Pedro Albizu Campos) – Punta Borinquen, Aeropuerto Rafael Hernández	Northeastern terminus of Expreso Rafael Hernández, "El Jibarito"; western terminus of Carretera José Joaquín "Yiye" Ávila
Aguadilla	Caimital Alto–Ceiba Baja line	119.5	74.3		PR-110 north (Avenida Miguel Ángel García Méndez) – Punta Borinquen, Aeropuerto Rafael Hernández	Western terminus of PR-110 concurrency
Aguadilla	Ceiba Baja	118.3	73.5		PR-110 (Carretera Antonio Cabán Vale, "El Topo") – Moca	Eastern terminus of PR-110 concurrency; eastern terminus of Carretera José Joaquín "Yiye" Ávila
Moca	No major junctions					
Isabela	Guerrero	113.1	70.3		PR-112 (Carretera Luis A. "Toñito" Pérez) – Arenales Bajos	Western terminus of PR-112 concurrency
Isabela	Guerrero–Mora line	112.9	70.2		PR-112 (Avenida Sargento Agustín Ramos Calero) – Isabela	Eastern terminus of PR-112 concurrency
Isabela	Guerrero–Arenales Bajos– Mora tripoint	112.0	69.6		PR-212 north (Carretera Santiago Polanco Abreu) / PR-4494 (Avenida Félix Aldarondo Santiago) – Isabela	
Isabela	Coto	105.1	65.3		PR-113 – Isabela	Western terminus of PR-113 concurrency; no left turn from PR-113
Río Guajataca		104.4	64.9	Puente Elvira		
Quebradillas	Terranova	103.6	64.4		PR-113 – Quebradillas	Eastern terminus of PR-113 concurrency; no left turn from PR-113
Camuy	Puente	91.7	57.0		PR-4491 (Avenida Los Veteranos) to PR-119 – Camuy, San Sebastián	
Hatillo	Hatillo barrio-pueblo	87.9– 87.8	54.6– 54.6		PR-130 (Avenida Pablo J. Aguilar) – Hatillo, Lares	
Hatillo	Hatillo–Hatillo barrio-pueblo line	86.5	53.7		PR-119 (Avenida Doctor Francisco Susoni) – Hatillo	
Hatillo	Carrizales	83.0	51.6	—	PR-22 east (Autopista José de Diego) – Lares, Utuado, San Juan	Trumpet interchange
Arecibo	Arecibo barrio-pueblo	77.3	48.0		PR-129 south (Avenida San Luis) – Lares	
Arecibo	Arecibo barrio-pueblo	76.1	47.3		PR-10 south to PR-22 (Autopista José de Diego) – Utuado, San Juan	PR-22 exit 75A
Arecibo	Factor	65.3	40.6		PR-22 (Autopista José de Diego) / PR-683 – Manatí, Morovis, San Juan, Hatillo, Aguadilla, Mayagüez	PR-22 exit 64
Barceloneta	Florida Afuera	58.2– 58.1	36.2– 36.1		PR-140 (Carretera Benito de Jesús Negrón) – Barceloneta, Florida	
Barceloneta	Florida Afuera	55.7	34.6		PR-140 (Carretera Benito de Jesús Negrón) to PR-22 (Autopista José de Diego) – Barceloneta, San Juan, Arecibo	PR-22 exit 55
Manatí	Coto Norte	48.4– 48.3	30.1– 30.0		PR-149 (Carretera Fernando "Nando" Otero Sánchez) to PR-22 (Autopista José de Diego) – Ciales, San Juan, Barceloneta, Arecibo	PR-22 exit 48
Vega Baja	Algarrobo	42.8	26.6		PR-137 south (Expreso Ángel "Tony" Laureano Martínez) to PR-22 (Autopista José de Diego) – Morovis, San Juan, Arecibo	PR-22 exits 42 and 42A
Vega Baja	Cabo Caribe	37.8	23.5		PR-155 (Calle Ramón Emeterio Betances) / PR-688 – Vega Baja	
Vega Baja	Río Abajo	37.5	23.3		PR-160 – Almirante Norte	
Vega Alta	Bajura	33.8	21.0		PR-22 (Autopista José de Diego) – Bayamón, San Juan, Arecibo, Mayagüez	PR-22 exit 32; partial cloverleaf interchange
Vega Alta	Espinosa	29.0	18.0		PR-694 north (Carretera Carmelo Mercado Adorno) to PR-22 (Autopista José de Diego) – Maguayo, Higuillar, San Juan, Arecibo	PR-22 exit 27
Dorado	Maguayo–Espinosa line	25.9	16.1	—	PR-142 south (Carretera José Antonio "Sonny" Rodríguez Ortiz) – Corozal	Trumpet interchange
Dorado	Río Lajas	23.5	14.6		PR-165 south (Carretera Río Lajas) / PR-693 north (Avenida Édgar Martínez Salgado) – Dorado, Toa Alta, Corozal	Western terminus of PR-165 concurrency
Río de la Plata		23.4	14.5	Puente de la Virgencita		
Toa Baja	Media Luna	22.6	14.0	—	PR-165 north to PR-22 (Autopista José de Diego) – Toa Baja, San Juan, Arecibo	Eastern terminus of PR-165 concurrency; PR-22 exits 22 and 22B; trumpet interchange
Bayamón	Hato Tejas	15.1	9.4		PR-29 (Avenida Main Oeste) – Cataño, San Juan	
Bayamón	Hato Tejas	14.3	8.9		PR-168 (Avenida Cementerio Nacional) – Hato Tejas	
Bayamón	Bayamón barrio-pueblo	11.9	7.4		PR-167 (Avenida Ramón Luis Rivera) – Bayamón, Naranjito, Comerío	
Bayamón	Bayamón barrio-pueblo	11.5– 11.4	7.1– 7.1	—	PR-5 (Expreso Río Hondo) – Bayamón, Cataño, San Juan, Arecibo, Aguas Buenas	Single-point urban interchange
Bayamón	Juan Sánchez	9.8	6.1		PR-6 north (Calle San José) – Cataño	
Guaynabo	Pueblo Viejo	6.4	4.0	6	PR-19 (Avenida Luis Vigoreaux) – Guaynabo	Eastbound exit only
Guaynabo	Pueblo Viejo	6.3	3.9	6	PR-20 south (Expreso Rafael Martínez Nadal) – Guaynabo, Caguas	Western terminus of Expreso John F. Kennedy; trumpet interchange
Guaynabo	Pueblo Viejo	5.7	3.5	5	PR-23 east (Avenida Franklin Delano Roosevelt) / PR-165 north (Avenida El Caño) – Guaynabo, San Patricio, Puerto Nuevo	
Guaynabo	Pueblo Viejo	5.0– 4.8	3.1– 3.0	4	PR-22 (Autopista José de Diego) – Santurce, Carolina, Caguas, Bayamón, Arecibo, Cataño	Signed as exits 4A (east) and 4C (west); no access to PR-22 eastbound from PR-2 westbound; PR-22 exits 6, 6A and 6B
San Juan	Río Puerto Nuevo	2.0– 1.5	1.2– 0.93	Puente de la Constitución		
San Juan	Santurce	1.3	0.81	—	PR-1 (Expreso Luis Muñoz Rivera) – San Juan, Miramar, Hato Rey, Carolina, Caguas	Eastern terminus of Expreso John F. Kennedy; western terminus of Avenida Roberto H. Todd; partial cloverleaf interchange
San Juan	Santurce	0.8	0.50		PR-42 (Calle Las Palmas) – Santurce	
San Juan	Santurce	0.6– 0.5	0.37– 0.31		PR-35 south (Avenida Manuel Fernández Juncos) – Santurce	One-way street
San Juan	Santurce	0.3	0.19		PR-25 north (Avenida Juan Ponce de León) – San Juan	One-way street
San Juan	Santurce	0.0	0.0		PR-26 (Expreso Román Baldorioty de Castro) – San Juan, Carolina	Counterclockwise terminus of PR-2; PR-26 exit 1; diamond interchange
San Juan	Santurce	0.0	0.0		Calle Condado / Calle Luisa	Continuation beyond PR-26
1.000 mi = 1.609 km; 1.000 km = 0.621 mi: Concurrency terminus; Incomplete access; Route transition

== Related routes ==
Puerto Rico Highway 2R (Spanish: Carretera Ramal 2, abbreviated Ramal PR-2 or PR-2R) refers to several urban roads in Puerto Rico, located in Aguadilla, Mayagüez, and Ponce, which serve as business routes for PR-2.

=== Aguadilla spur ===
Highway 2 Spur
- Location: Aguadilla
- Length: 0.85 km (0.53 mi; 2,800 ft)

This short east–west segment, known as San Carlos Avenue, is the main connection to both downtown Aguadilla and Aguadilla Mall from PR-2. It begins at an interchange with PR-2, immediately to the east is the mall. It then heads west through a curvy downhill slope, quickly arriving in the town square and intersecting with PR-111. It then immediately ends at PR-440 in front of the coastline. From the PR-2 interchange to the square it is divided, while the rest is a two way urban street. The entire route is located in Aguadilla.

Location	km	mi	Destinations	Notes
Aguadilla barrio-pueblo	0.85	0.53	PR-440 (Avenida José de Jesús Esteves) – Aguadilla	Western terminus of Ramal PR-2; roundabout
Aguadilla barrio-pueblo	0.75	0.47	PR-1107 south (Calle José de Diego) – Aguadilla	Former PR-111; one-way street
Aguadilla barrio-pueblo	0.70	0.43	PR-1107P north (Calle Ramón Emeterio Betances) – Aguadilla	Former PR-111R; one-way street
Caimital Bajo	0.00	0.00	PR-2 (Expreso Rafael Hernández, "El Jibarito") – Arecibo, Mayagüez	Eastern terminus of Ramal PR-2; PR-2 exit 128
1.000 mi = 1.609 km; 1.000 km = 0.621 mi

=== Mayagüez loop ===
Highway 2R
- Location: Mayagüez
- Length: 5.3 km (3.3 mi)
- Existed: 1997

Historically was the right of way of PR-2 inside Mayagüez downtown before the construction of Avenida Eugenio María de Hostos. The entirety of its segment in Mayagüez was formerly known as Calle Post, until recently when it was renamed into two names, under the José Guillermo Rodríguez administration. As the longest street in Mayagüez, served as main entrance to the center of the city and gave access to some communities as Colombia, Santurce, Belmonte, Cuesta de las Piedras, Río Cristal and Barriada Nadal (Poblado Sábalos). Originally named by governor Regis Henri Post in 1909, it was recently renamed both honoring Alfonso Valdés Cobián and Ramón Emeterio Betances by disposition of the Municipal Legislative. Currently the entire road was renumbered to PR-239.

The former street runs north–south for 5 miles and begins in a park at front of the University of Puerto Rico at Mayagüez on the intersection of PR-2, connecting with Puerto Rico Highway 65 just before crossing the Yagüez River. In this section is called now Alfonso Valdés Cobián Boulevard. Going south the Yagüez River comes inside the downtown of Mayagüez city, crossing the Méndez Vigo (PR-106), Candelaria (PR-105), Nenadich, Hiram David Cabassa, PR-348, PR-380, and Carolina roads to finally ending at the PR-2 aside with Avenida Corazones in Sábalos ward. In this section is called now Ramón Emeterio Betances Street. The entire route is located in Mayagüez.

Location	km	mi	Destinations	Notes
Sábalos	5.3	3.3	PR-114 south (Avenida Santa Teresa Jornet)	Continuation beyond PR-2
Sábalos	5.3	3.3	PR-2 (Expreso Eugenio María de Hostos) – Hormigueros, Ponce, Añasco, Aguadilla	Southern terminus of PR-2R and western terminus of PR-114
Sábalos	5.2– 5.1	3.2– 3.2	PR-Avenida Corazones – Mayagüez	
Sábalos	3.6	2.2	PR-380 – Mayagüez	
Sábalos–Mayagüez barrio-pueblo line	3.3	2.1	PR-348 – Quebrada Grande	
Sábalos–Mayagüez barrio-pueblo line	2.7– 2.6	1.7– 1.6	To PR-2 (Expreso Eugenio María de Hostos) / PR-Avenida Hiram David Cabassa – Mayagüez	
Mayagüez barrio-pueblo	1.9	1.2	PR-Calle Nenadich – Mayagüez	
Mayagüez barrio-pueblo	1.4	0.87	To PR-105 (Ruta Panorámica) / [[Puerto Rico Highway Calle de la Candelaria |PR-Calle de la Candelaria]] – Maricao	One-way street
Mayagüez barrio-pueblo	1.3	0.81	To PR-2 (Expreso Eugenio María de Hostos) / [[Puerto Rico Highway Calle Méndez Vigo |PR-Calle Méndez Vigo]] – Mayagüez	One-way street
Mayagüez barrio-pueblo	0.9	0.56	PR-65 east (Avenida Pedro Albizu Campos) to PR-108 – Mayagüez, Las Marías	Northern terminus of PR-2R through Calle Ramón Emeterio Betances; eastern terminus of PR-2R through Bulevar Alfonso Valdés Cobián
Mayagüez barrio-pueblo	0.0	0.0	PR-2 (Expreso Eugenio María de Hostos) – Aguadilla, Ponce	Northern terminus of PR-2R
1.000 mi = 1.609 km; 1.000 km = 0.621 mi: Route transition

=== Ponce spur ===
Highway 2R
- Location: Ponce
- Length: 1.9 km (1.2 mi)

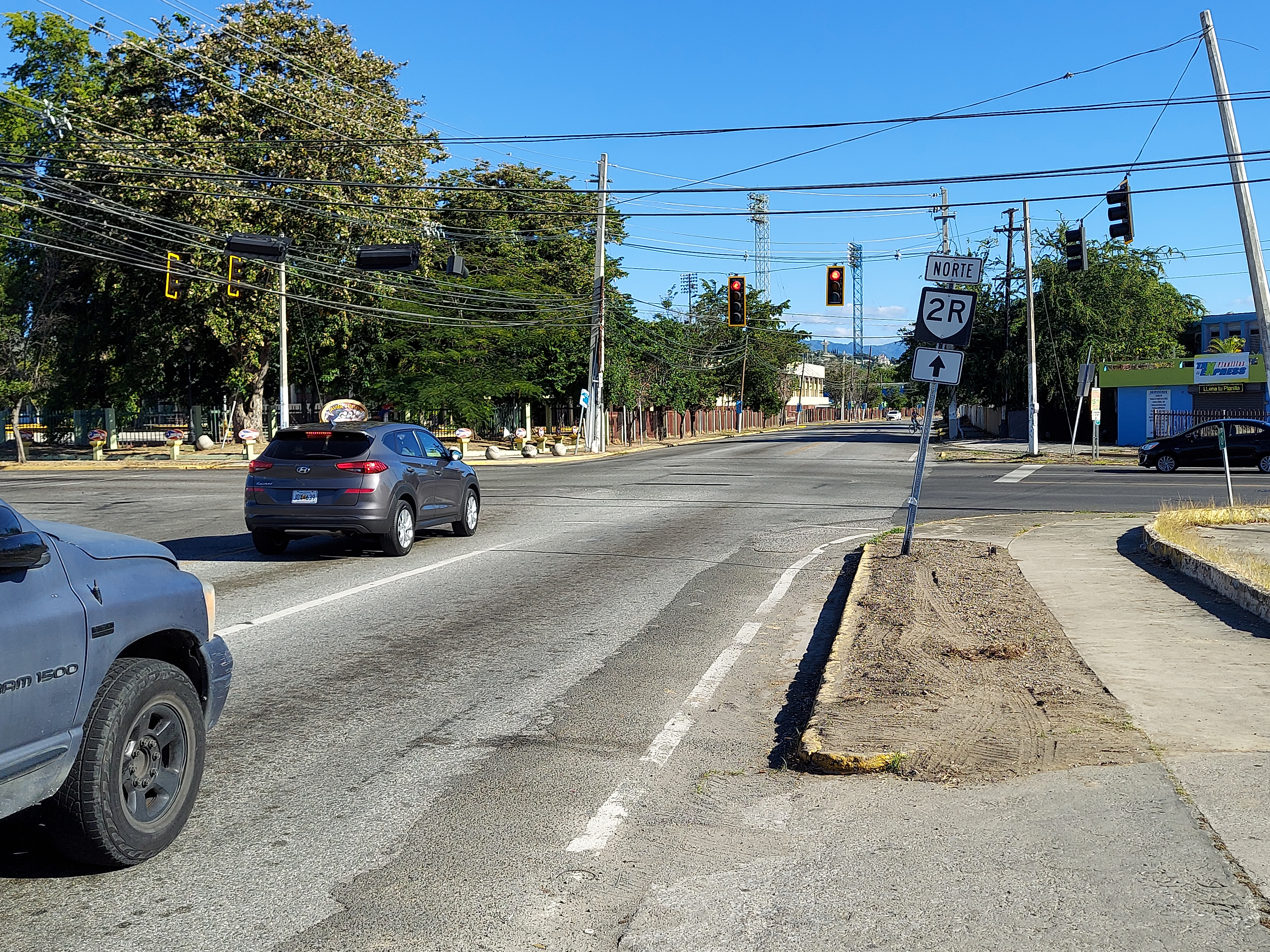
PR-2R in Barrio Canas Urbano

Map of PR-2R in the municipality of Ponce

Also known as Carretera a Pámpanos, the north–south road runs for 1.9 km (1.2 mi) and was the original PR-2 before the construction of the current alignment known as the Ponce By Pass. Some publications call the northern portion of this road Calle Coto Canas.

Located entirely within Barrio Canas, PR-2R begins at PR-2 in the south, in the Pámpanos neighborhood and, as you head north, it passes the Paquito Montaner Stadium and the Juan Pachín Vicéns Auditorium, both to the left. PR-2R then passes Escuela Superior Vocacional (Vocational High School) to the right and Secretaría de Recreación y Deportes Francisco "Pancho" Coimbre to the left, where it intersects with PR-163 (Avenida Las Américas). The road then continues north for approximately another one-half mile before ending at PR-123 (Calle Villa Street). This northern terminus is located about 1.0 kilometer west of downtown Ponce. The entire length of PR-2R in Ponce is a two-lane road.

In the 1810s, today's PR-2R in Ponce was part of what was called "Camino de Tallaboa" (Road to Tallaboa), a road that since, at least, the 1810s led from the center of Ponce to Barrio Tallaboa in Peñuelas. The 1810s' Camino de Tallaboa consisted of three segments. The first segment was half a kilometer long and led from the center of Ponce in the east (Plaza Real) to a point west where today's Calle Villa intersects Calle Capitan Correa. That segment was called "Calle de la Villa" (Street to the Villa), for it led to the "Villa de Ponce" (the center of town) from points west. This segment is today (2019) part of PR-132, the road to Peñuelas. The second segment of Camino de Tallaboa was called "Carretera al Barrio de los Pámpanos", or just "Carretera a Pámpanos". It had its northern terminus at today's Calle Villa and headed southwest to barrio Pámpanos, a small community bound on the south by today's PR-2, on the east and north by today's Avenida Eduardo Ruberté, and in the west by the eastern banks of Río Matilde. Thus Carretera a Pámpanos had its southern terminus at today's PR-2 in Barrio Canas. This second/middle segment of Camino de Tallaboa is what is called today PR-2R. (Note: Around the middle of the XIX century, this segment was straightened to run north-south instead of north-southwest, bring its northern terminus to the intersection of Calle Villa and Calle Miramar. The section of PR-2R from the intersection of Calle Villa and Miramar to Avenida Roosevelt is sometimes seen in maps as "Calle Coto Canas".)) The third and last segment of Camino de Tallaboa had its eastern terminus at Carretera Pámpanos and its western terminus in Peñuelas's Barrio Tallaboa. Between the late 1940s and 1965, this road was replaced by today's PR-2. The entire route is located in Ponce.

Location	km	mi	Destinations	Notes
Playa–Canas Urbano line	0.0	0.0	PR-5549	Continuation beyond PR-2; dead end road
Playa–Canas Urbano line	0.0	0.0	PR-2 (Ponce Bypass) – San Juan, Mayagüez	Southern terminus of PR-2R and northern terminus of PR-5549
Canas Urbano	0.4– 0.5	0.25– 0.31	PR-585 south (Avenida Eduardo Roberté Bisó) – Ponce	
Canas Urbano	1.1	0.68	PR-163 (Bulevar Luis A. Ferré Aguayo) – Ponce	
Primero–Canas Urbano– Segundo tripoint	1.9	1.2	PR-123 (Calle Villa) – Ponce, Adjuntas	Northern terminus of PR-2R
1.000 mi = 1.609 km; 1.000 km = 0.621 mi

== See also ==
- Interstate Highways in Puerto Rico
- List of highways in Ponce, Puerto Rico
- List of streets in Ponce, Puerto Rico
