= Puerto Rico Highway 112 =

Highway in Puerto Rico

Highway 112
- Ruta 112

Route information
- Maintained by Puerto Rico DTPW
- Length: 18.0 km (11.2 mi)

Major junctions
- South end: PR-125 in Capá
- PR-445 in Rocha; PR-444 in Rocha; PR-4445 in Rocha; PR-494 in Arenales Altos–Arenales Bajos; PR-4477 in Guerrero; PR-2 in Guerrero–Mora; PR-4472 in Bejucos–Mora
- North end: PR-113 / PR-459 in Isabela barrio-pueblo

Location
- Country: United States
- Territory: Puerto Rico
- Municipalities: Moca, Isabela

Highway system
- Roads in Puerto Rico; List
← PR-111	→ PR-113

Puerto Rico Highway 112 (PR-112) is a rural road that travels from Isabela, Puerto Rico to Moca. It begins at its intersection with PR-113 in downtown Isabela and ends at its junction with PR-125 in eastern Moca.

== Major intersections ==
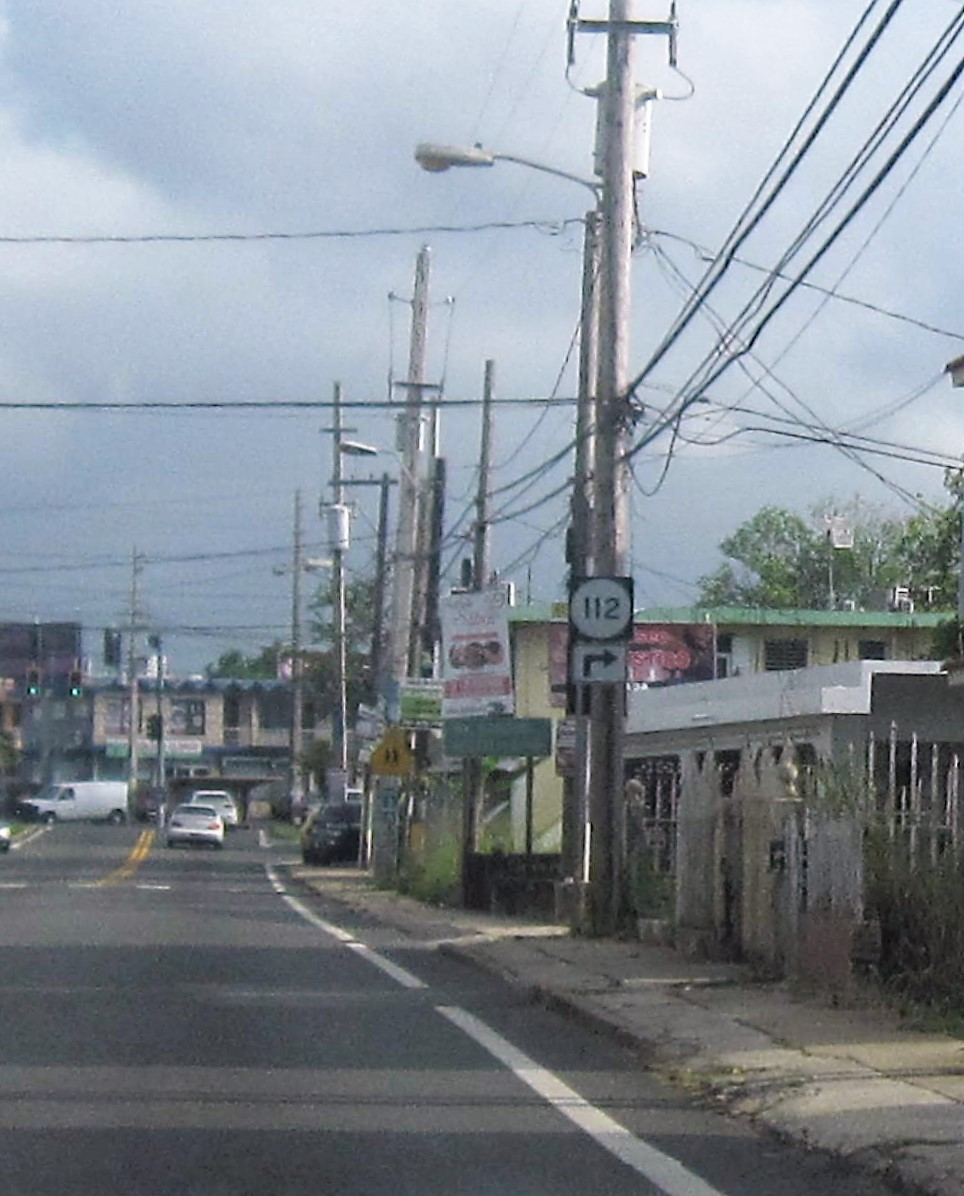
Puerto Rico Highway 112 in Isabela

Municipality	Location	km	mi	Destinations	Notes
Moca	Capá	18.0	11.2	PR-125 – Moca, San Sebastián	Southern terminus of PR-112
Moca	Rocha	15.5– 15.4	9.6– 9.6	PR-445 – Salto	
Moca	Rocha	14.6	9.1	PR-444 (Carretera Quique Vale Avilés) – Cuchillas	
Moca	Rocha	13.3	8.3	PR-4445 – Arenales Altos	
Isabela	Arenales Altos–Arenales Bajos line	5.5	3.4	PR-494 (Carretera Corpus Cortés Vargas) – Arenales Bajos	
Isabela	Guerrero	4.2– 4.1	2.6– 2.5	PR-4477 – Arenales Bajos	
Isabela	Guerrero	3.7 113.1 (Note: Kilometer markers represent the distance along PR-2 rather than PR-112.)	2.3 70.3	PR-2 west – Aguadilla	Western terminus of PR-2 concurrency
Isabela	Guerrero–Mora line	112.9 3.6	70.2 2.2	PR-2 east – Arecibo	Eastern terminus of PR-2 concurrency
Isabela	Bejucos–Mora line	0.9	0.56	PR-4472 east (Carretera Víctor Manuelle) to PR-212 (Carretera Santiago Polanco Abreu) – Isabela	
Isabela	Isabela barrio-pueblo	0.0	0.0	PR-113 (Calle José Celso Barbosa) / PR-459 (Avenida Lamela) – Quebradillas, Aguadilla	Northern terminus of PR-112; one way streets; PR-459 access via Calle Juan González
1.000 mi = 1.609 km; 1.000 km = 0.621 mi: Concurrency terminus; Incomplete access
