= Puerto Rico Highway 212 =

Highway in Puerto Rico

Highway 212
- Ruta 212
- Carretera Santiago Polanco Abreu

Route information
- Maintained by Puerto Rico DTPW
- Length: 2.6 km (1.6 mi)

Major junctions
- South end: PR-2 / PR-4494 in Arenales Bajos–Guerrero–Mora
- North end: PR-4472 in Mora

Location
- Country: United States
- Territory: Puerto Rico
- Municipalities: Isabela

Highway system
- Roads in Puerto Rico; List
← PR-208	→ PR-238

Puerto Rico Highway 212 (PR-212) is a north–south bypass located south of downtown Isabela, Puerto Rico. This road extends from the junction of PR-2 with PR-4494 to PR-4472, near PR-112, and is known as Carretera Santiago Polanco Abreu.

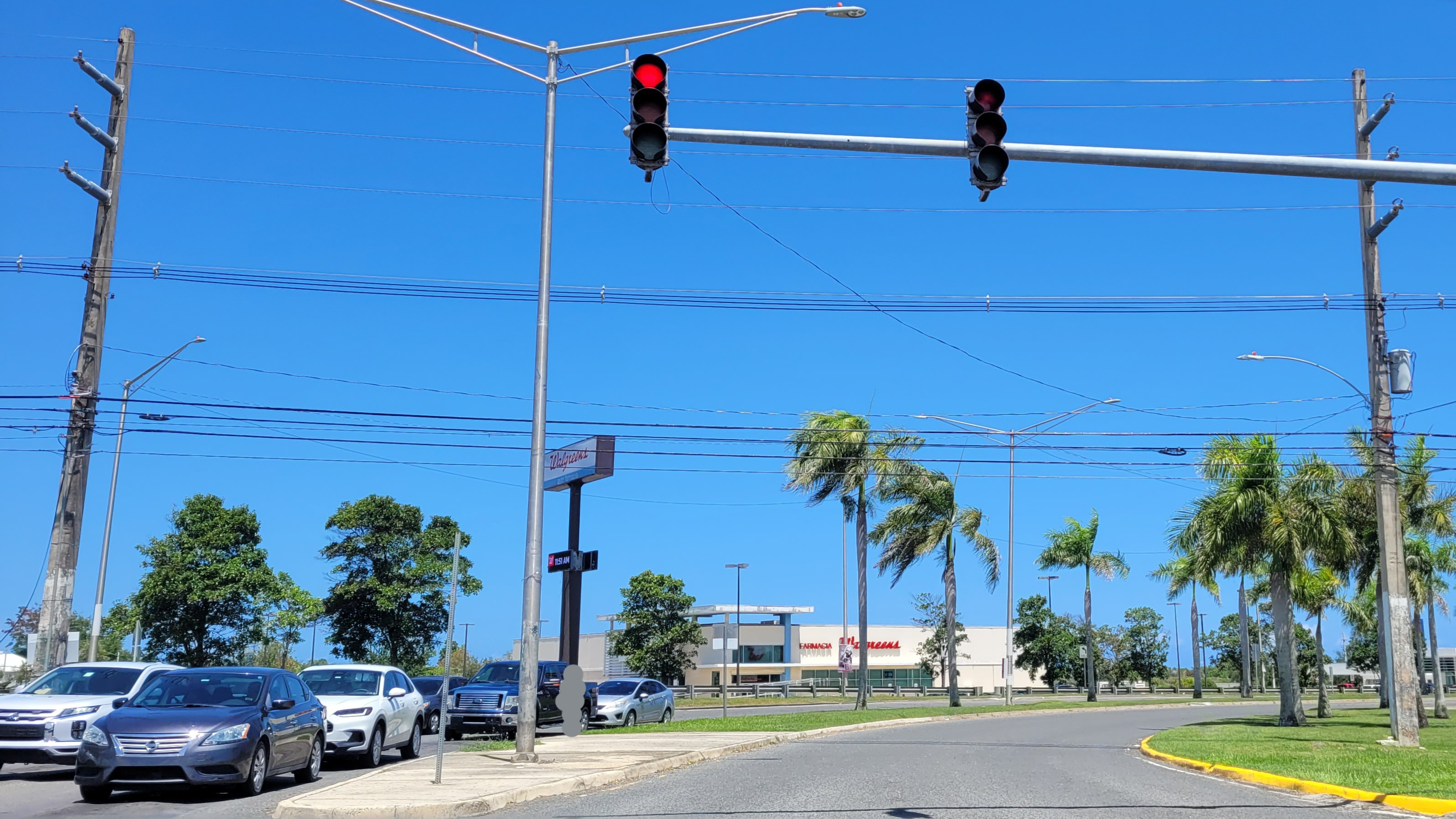
Southern terminus of PR-212

== Major intersections ==
The entire route is located in Isabela.

Location	km	mi	Destinations	Notes
Arenales Bajos–Guerrero– Mora tripoint	0.0	0.0	PR-4494 (Avenida Félix Aldarondo Santiago)	Continuation beyond PR-2
Arenales Bajos–Guerrero– Mora tripoint	0.0	0.0	PR-2 – Arecibo, Aguadilla	Southern terminus of PR-212 and northern terminus of PR-4494
Mora	1.3	0.81	PR-Calle José González – Isabela	
Mora	2.6	1.6	PR-4472 (Carretera Víctor Manuelle) – Isabela	Northern terminus of PR-212; seagull intersection
1.000 mi = 1.609 km; 1.000 km = 0.621 mi

== See also ==
- Santiago Polanco-Abreu
