= Puerto Rico Highway 585 =

Highway in Puerto Rico

Highway 585
- Ruta 585

Route information
- Maintained by Puerto Rico DTPW
- Length: 2.7 km (1.7 mi)

Major junctions
- South end: PR-123 in Playa
- PR-2 in Playa–Canas Urbano
- North end: PR-2R in Canas Urbano

Location
- Country: United States
- Territory: Puerto Rico
- Municipalities: Ponce

Highway system
- Roads in Puerto Rico; List
← PR-578	→ PR-588

Puerto Rico Highway 585 (PR-585) is tertiary state highway in Ponce, Puerto Rico. The road leads from PR-2R in Sector Pámpanos of Barrio Canas to Avenida Padre Noel in Barrio Playa. It runs west to east, starting from its western terminus at PR-2R (Carretera Pámpanos) and ending at its eastern terminus at PR-123 (Avenida Hostos).

== Major intersections ==
The entire route is located in Ponce.

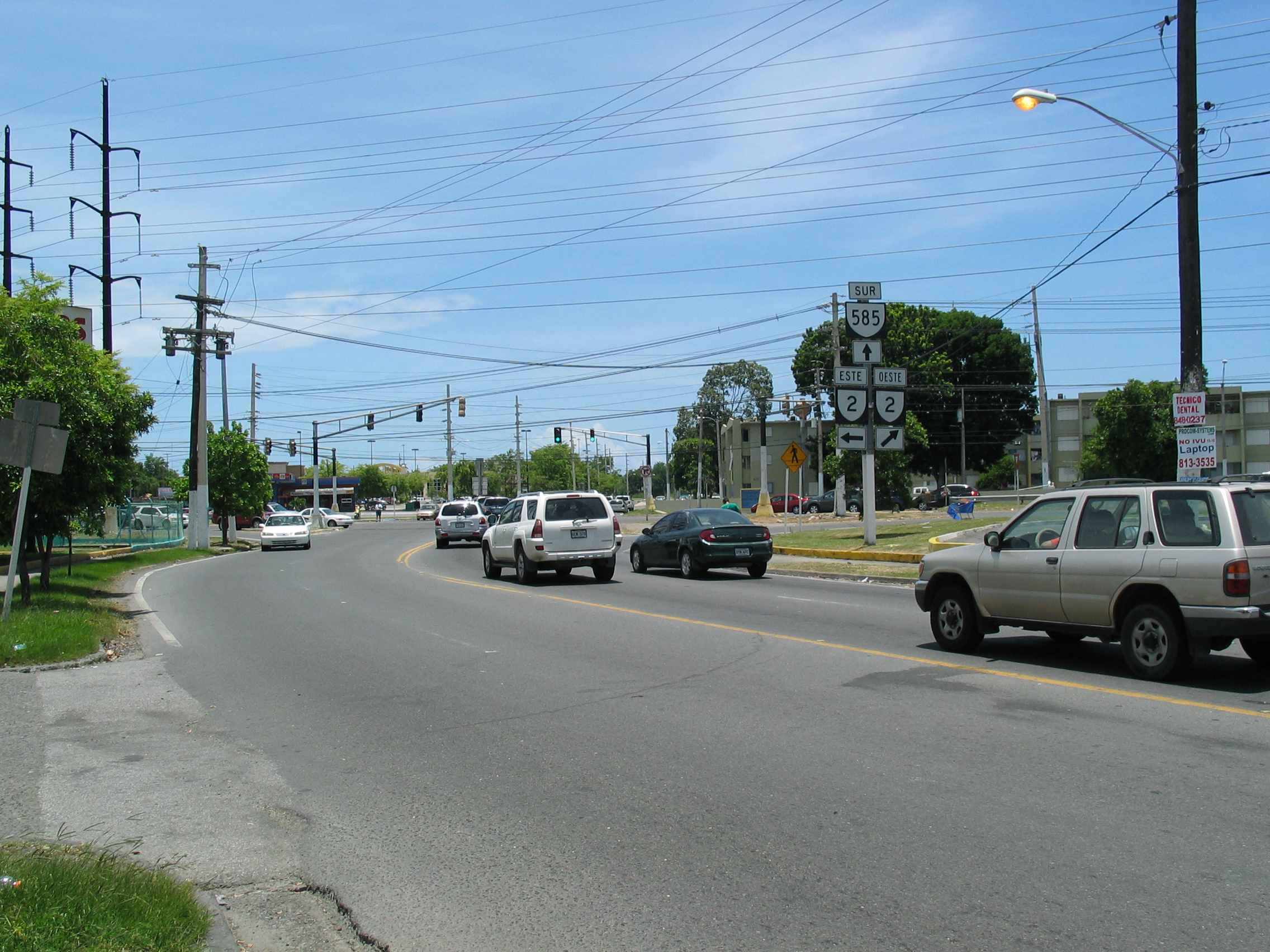
PR-585 south as it approaches PR-2 (Ponce Bypass) from Barrio Canas to Barrio Playa

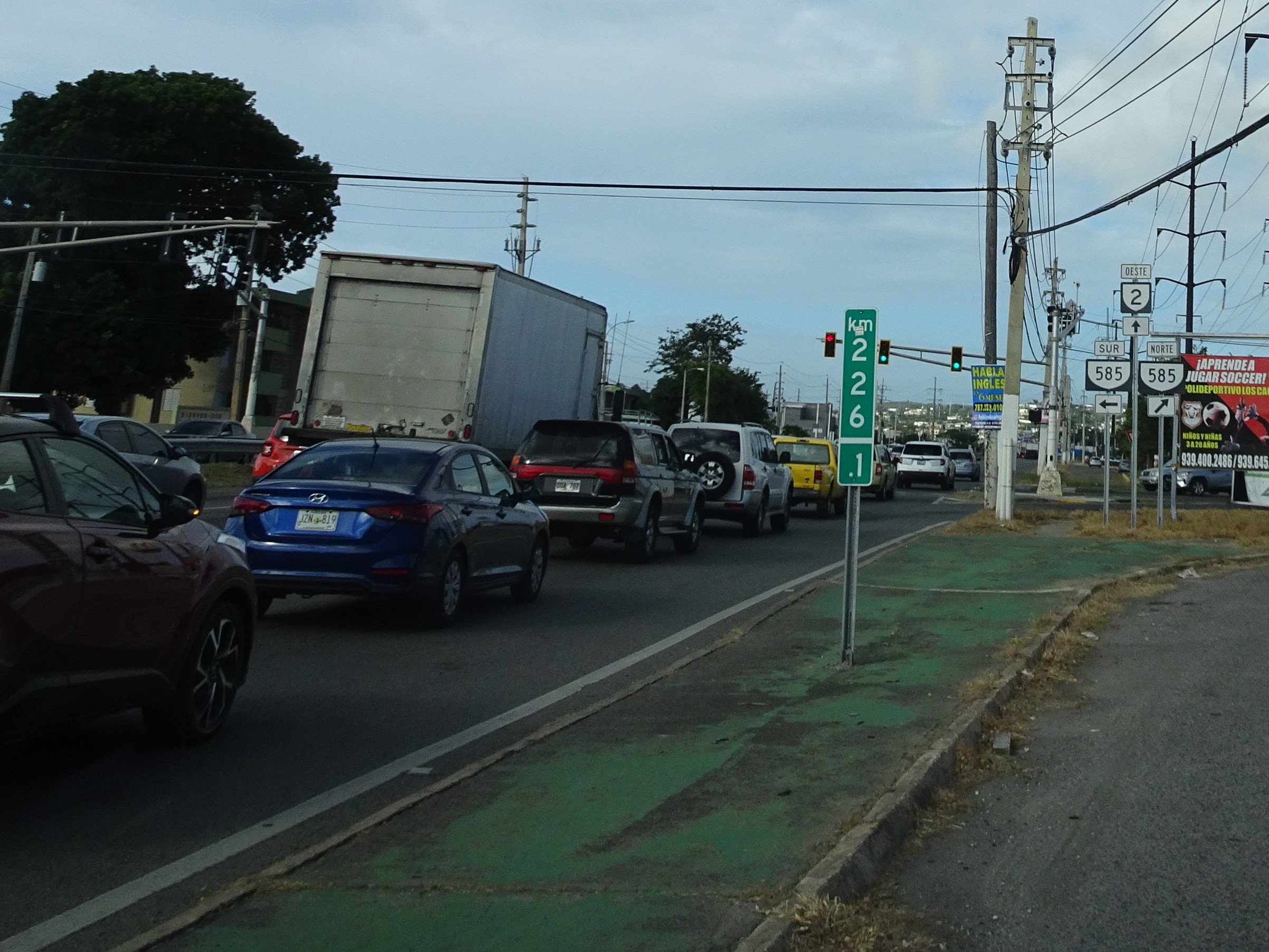
PR-2 (Ponce Bypass) west as it approaches PR-585

Location	km	mi	Destinations	Notes
Playa	2.7	1.7	PR-123	Southern terminus of PR-585
Playa–Canas Urbano line	0.5	0.31	PR-2 – Peñuelas, Mayagüez, Juana Díaz, San Juan	Ponce Bypass
Canas Urbano	0.0	0.0	PR-2R	Northern terminus of PR-585
1.000 mi = 1.609 km; 1.000 km = 0.621 mi

== See also ==
- List of highways in Ponce, Puerto Rico
