= Puerto Rico Highway 588 =

Highway in Puerto Rico

Highway 588
- Ruta 588

Route information
- Maintained by Puerto Rico DTPW
- Length: 1.7 km (1.1 mi)

Major junctions
- South end: PR-504 in Portugués
- North end: Camino La Zarza in Portugués

Location
- Country: United States
- Territory: Puerto Rico
- Municipalities: Ponce

Highway system
- Roads in Puerto Rico; List
← PR-585	→ PR-591

Puerto Rico Highway 588 (PR-588) is a tertiary mountainous state highway in Ponce, Puerto Rico. The road is approximately 1.5 km (0.93 mi) long and is a spur of Puerto Rico Highway 504.

== Route description ==
At its southern terminus, the road starts at coordinates 18.05876°N 66.61921°W in its intersection with Puerto Rico Highway PR-504, and terminates at its northern terminus at coordinates 18.06831°N 66.62138°W at its intersection with Camino La Zarza. The road runs north to south, and mostly along Río Chiquito in barrio Portugués. The southern terminus connects at kilometer mark 3.0 of PR-504. Its northern terminus connects with Camino La Zarza, which leads eastwardly back to PR-504 via Camino Río Chiquito Hoyos, which becomes Camino La Cuchilla in its approach to PR-504. This Camino Río Chiquito Hoyos/Camino La Cuchilla run is about 0.9 km (0.56 mi) long.

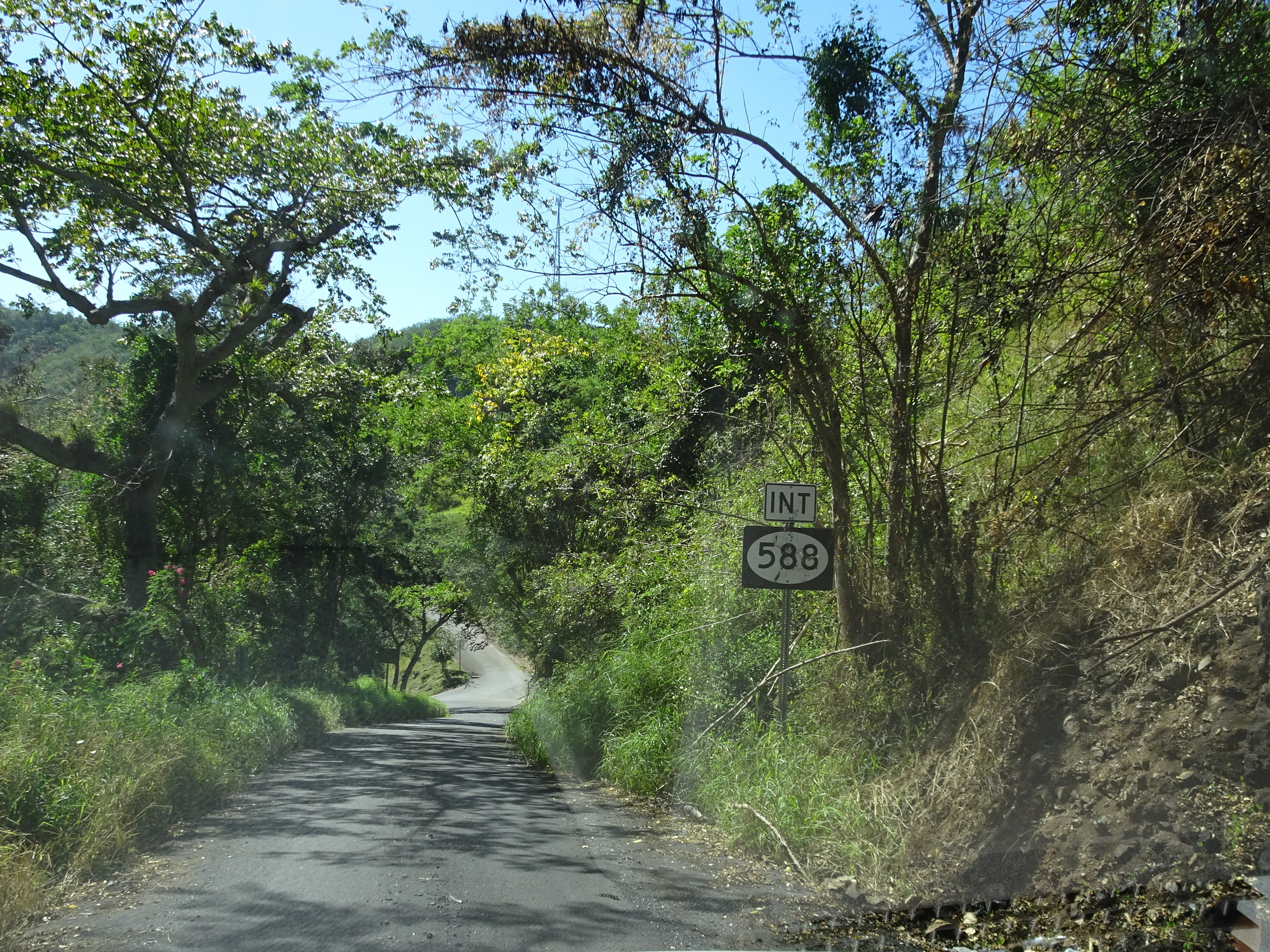
PR-504 south near PR-588 intersection

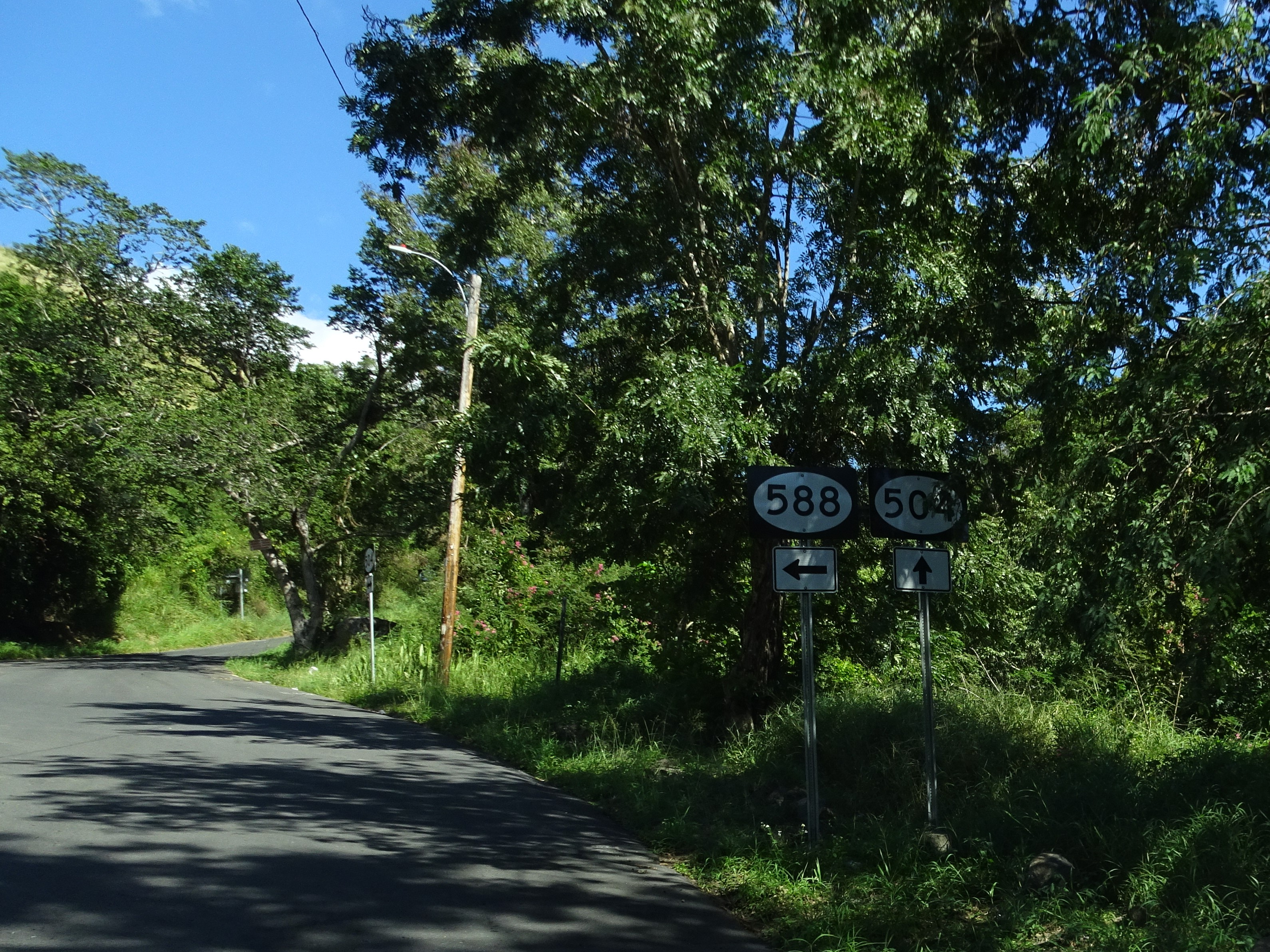
PR-504 north at PR-588 intersection

== Major intersections ==
The entire route is located in Portugués, Ponce.

km	mi	Destinations	Notes
0.0	0.0	PR-504 – Ponce	Southern terminus of PR-588
1.7	1.1	PR-Camino La Zarza – Portugués	Northern terminus of PR-588
1.000 mi = 1.609 km; 1.000 km = 0.621 mi

== See also ==
- List of highways in Ponce, Puerto Rico
