= Guerrero, Isabela, Puerto Rico =

Barrio of Puerto Rico

Guerrero
- Barrio
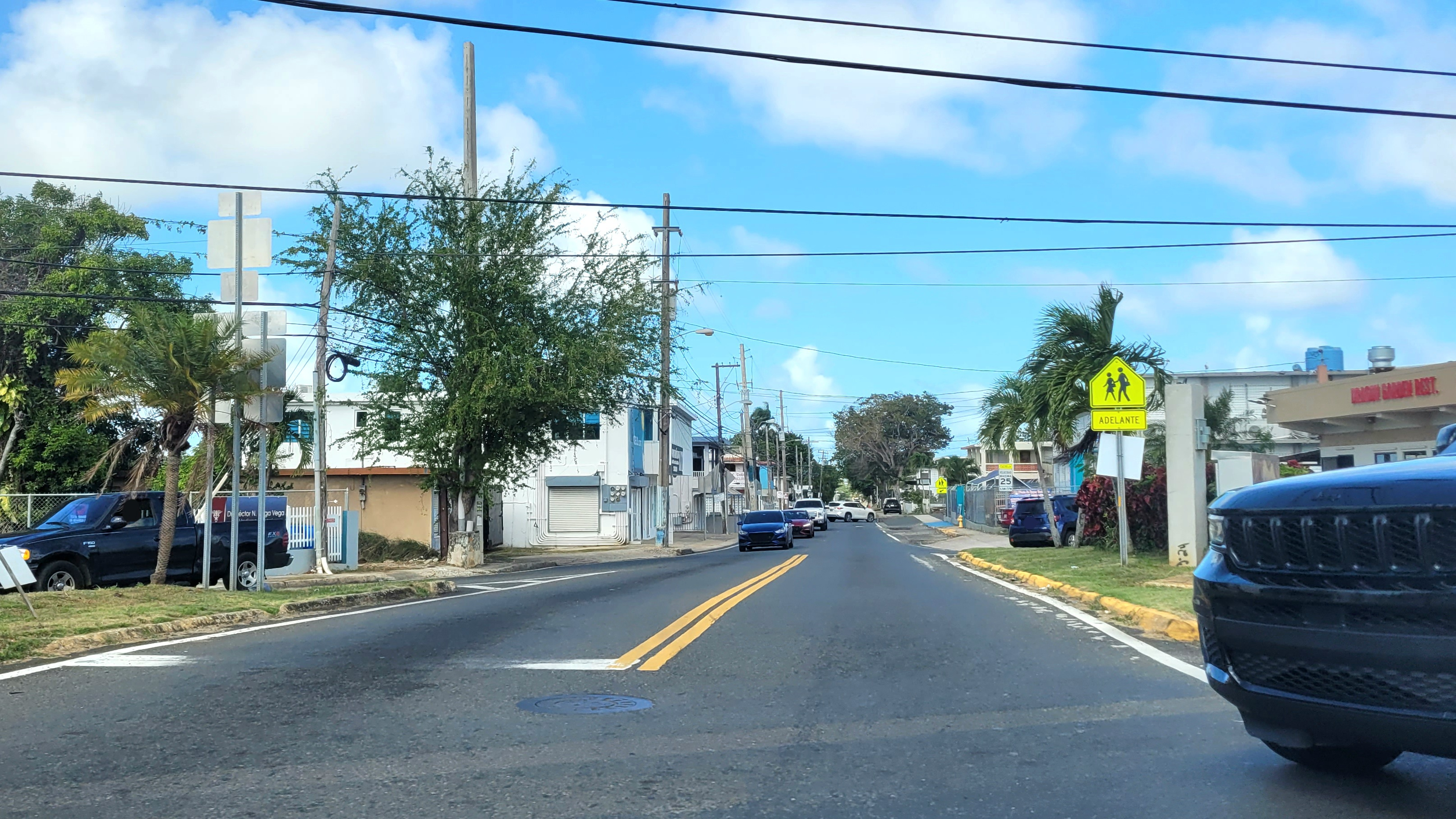
- Puerto Rico Highway 112 between Guerrero and Mora

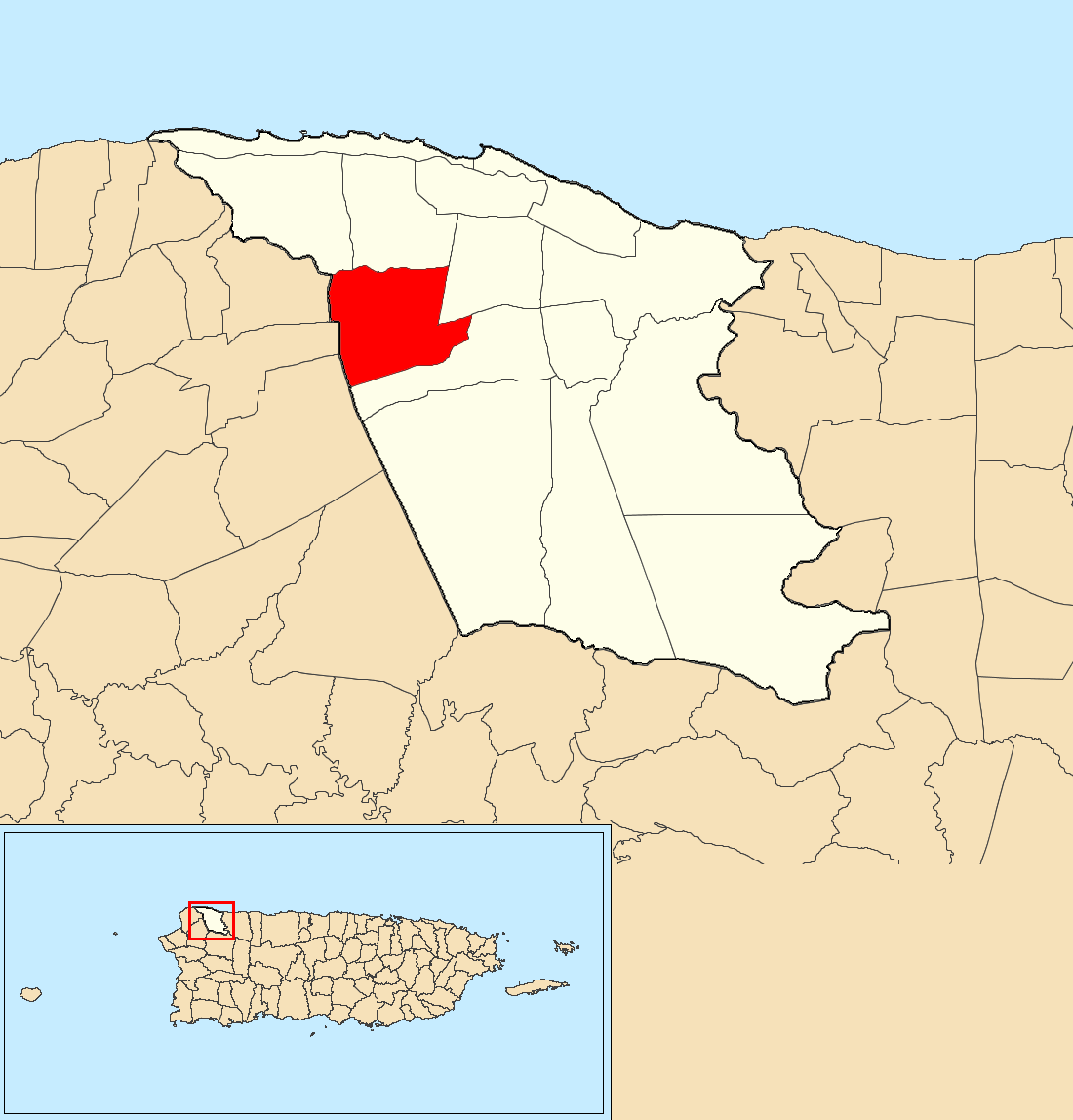
- Location of Guerrero within the municipality of Isabela shown in red

- Location of Puerto Rico
- Coordinates: 18°28′27″N 67°02′53″W
- Commonwealth: Puerto Rico
- Municipality: Isabela

Area
  - Total: 3.22 sq mi (8.3 km^{2})
  - Land: 3.22 sq mi (8.3 km^{2})
  - Water: 0 sq mi (0 km^{2})
- Elevation: 400 ft (120 m)

Population (2010)
  - Total: 3,552
  - Density: 1,103.1/sq mi (425.9/km^{2})
- Source: 2010 Census
- Time zone: UTC−4 (AST)

Guerrero is a barrio in the municipality of Isabela, Puerto Rico. Its population in 2010 was 3,552.

== History ==
Guerrero was in Spain's gazetteers until Puerto Rico was ceded by Spain in the aftermath of the Spanish–American War under the terms of the Treaty of Paris of 1898 and became an unincorporated territory of the United States. In 1899, the United States Department of War conducted a census of Puerto Rico finding that the population of Guerrero barrio was 753.

Historical population
Census	Pop.	Note	%±
1900	753		—
1910	887		17.8%
1920	940		6.0%
1930	1,232		31.1%
1940	1,133		−8.0%
1950	1,557		37.4%
1960	1,701		9.2%
1970	2,739		61.0%
1980	3,305		20.7%
1990	3,739		13.1%
2000	3,854		3.1%
2010	3,552		−7.8%
U.S. Decennial Census; 1899 (shown as 1900) 1910-1930; 1930-1950 1980-2000 2010

== See also ==
- List of communities in Puerto Rico
