= Arenales Bajos =

Barrio of Isabela, Puerto Rico

- Barrio
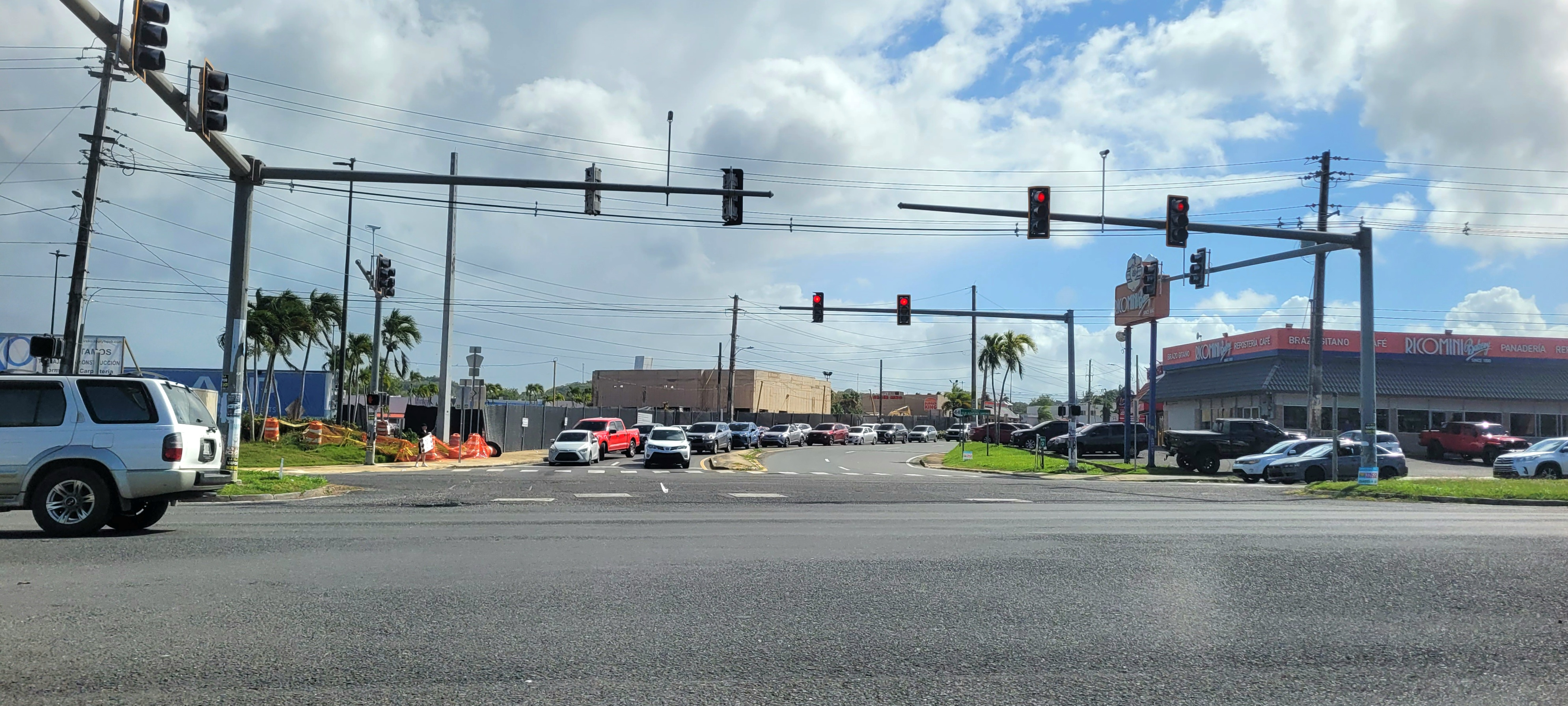
- Puerto Rico Highway 4494 between Arenales Bajos and Guerrero

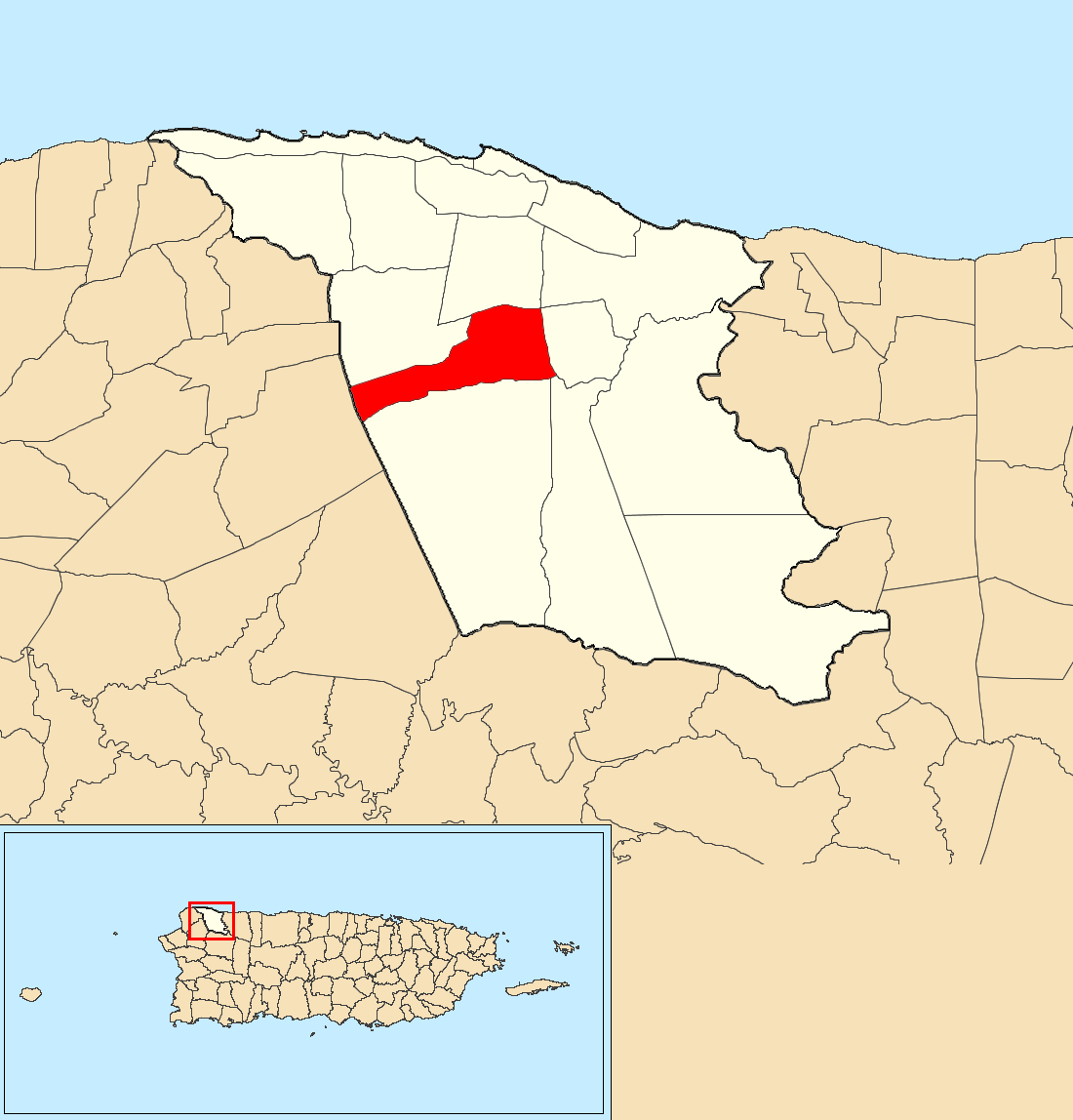
- Location of Arenales Bajos within the municipality of Isabela shown in red

- Location of Puerto Rico
- Coordinates: 18°27′32″N 67°01′33″W
- Commonwealth: Puerto Rico
- Municipality: Isabela

Area
  - Total: 2.56 sq mi (6.6 km^{2})
  - Land: 2.56 sq mi (6.6 km^{2})
  - Water: 0 sq mi (0 km^{2})
- Elevation: 476 ft (145 m)

Population (2010)
  - Total: 3,591
  - Density: 1,402.7/sq mi (541.6/km^{2})
- Source: 2010 Census
- Time zone: UTC−4 (AST)
- ZIP Code: 00662
- Area code: 787/939

Arenales Bajos is a barrio in the municipality of Isabela, Puerto Rico. Its population in 2010 was 3,591.

== History ==
Arenales Bajos was in Spain's gazetteers until Puerto Rico was ceded by Spain in the aftermath of the Spanish–American War under the terms of the Treaty of Paris of 1898 and became an unincorporated territory of the United States. In 1899, the United States Department of War conducted a census of Puerto Rico finding that the population of Arenales Bajos barrio was 833.

Historical population
| Census | Pop. | Note | %± |
|---|---|---|---|
| 1900 | 833 | | — |
| 1910 | 1,040 | | 24.8% |
| 1920 | 1,155 | | 11.1% |
| 1930 | 1,346 | | 16.5% |
| 1940 | 1,956 | | 45.3% |
| 1950 | 2,032 | | 3.9% |
| 1960 | 1,820 | | −10.4% |
| 1970 | 1,920 | | 5.5% |
| 1980 | 2,501 | | 30.3% |
| 1990 | 2,301 | | −8.0% |
| 2000 | 3,296 | | 43.2% |
| 2010 | 3,591 | | 9.0% |
U.S. Decennial Census; 1899 (shown as 1900) 1910-1930; 1930-1950 1980-2000 2010

== See also ==
- List of communities in Puerto Rico
