= Mora, Isabela, Puerto Rico =

Barrio of Puerto Rico

Mora
- Barrio
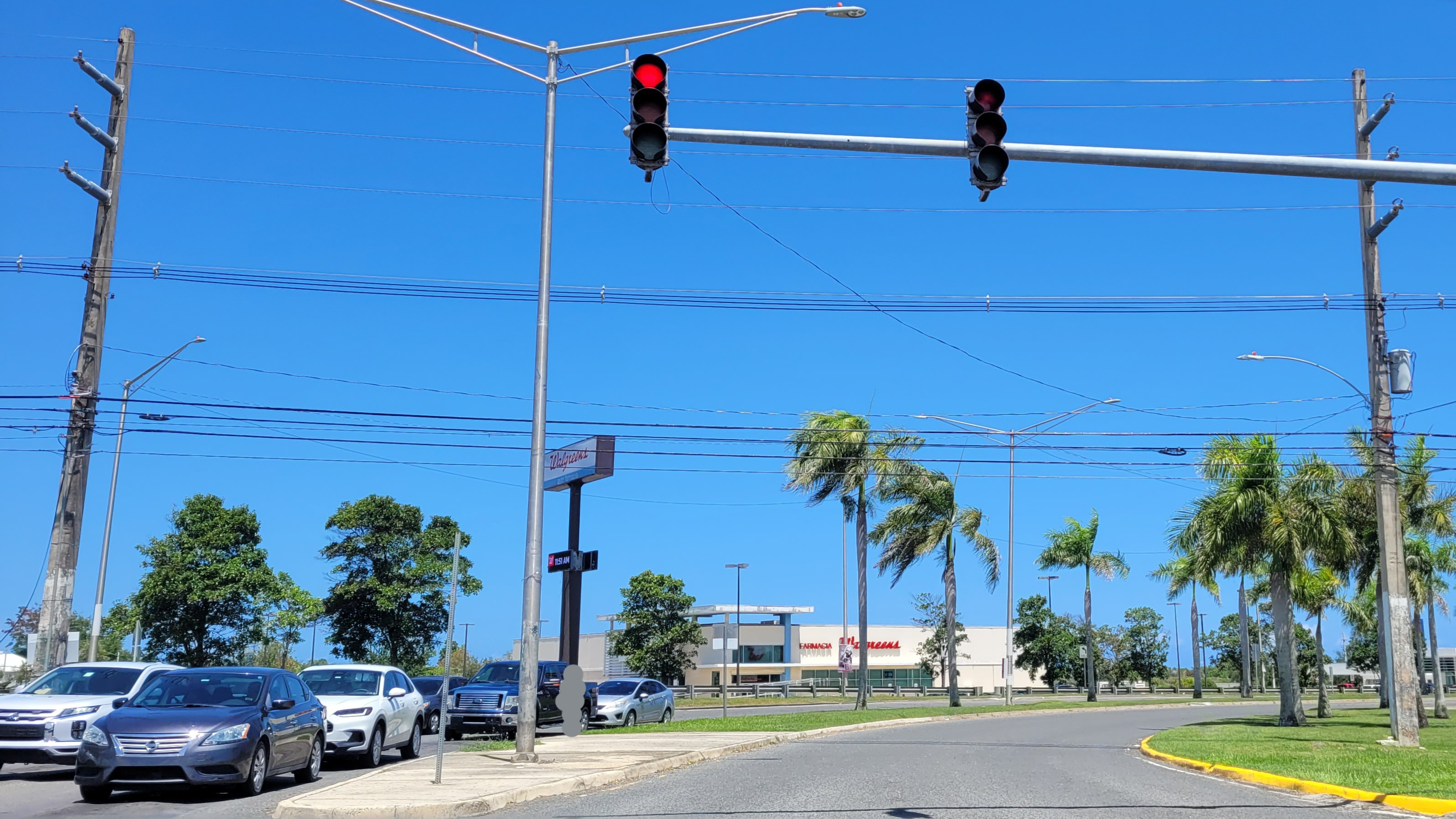
- Puerto Rico Highway 212 in Mora

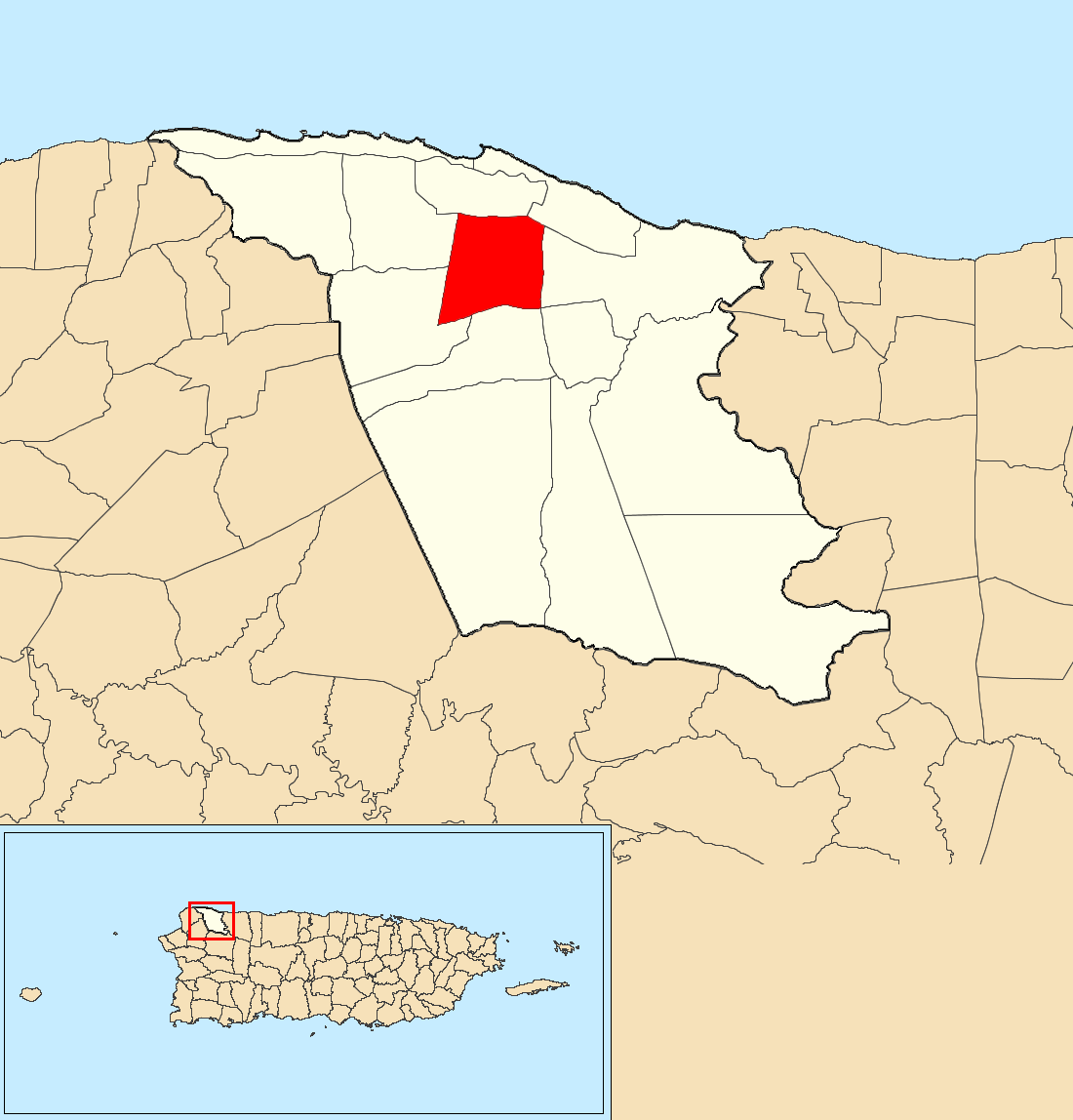
- Location of Mora within the municipality of Isabela shown in red

- Location of Puerto Rico
- Coordinates: 18°29′02″N 67°00′51″W
- Commonwealth: Puerto Rico
- Municipality: Isabela

Area
  - Total: 2.38 sq mi (6.2 km^{2})
  - Land: 2.38 sq mi (6.2 km^{2})
  - Water: 0 sq mi (0 km^{2})
- Elevation: 322 ft (98 m)

Population (2010)
  - Total: 4,682
  - Density: 1,967.2/sq mi (759.5/km^{2})
- Source: 2010 Census
- Time zone: UTC−4 (AST)

Mora is a barrio in the municipality of Isabela, Puerto Rico. Its population in 2010 was 4,682.

== History ==
Mora was in Spain's gazetteers until Puerto Rico was ceded by Spain in the aftermath of the Spanish–American War under the terms of the Treaty of Paris of 1898 and became an unincorporated territory of the United States. In 1899, the United States Department of War conducted a census of Puerto Rico finding that the population of Mora barrio was 972.

Historical population
Census	Pop.	Note	%±
1900	972		—
1910	1,096		12.8%
1920	1,276		16.4%
1930	1,352		6.0%
1940	1,467		8.5%
1950	1,423		−3.0%
1960	1,439		1.1%
1970	0		−100.0%
1980	3,448		—
1990	3,617		4.9%
2000	4,271		18.1%
2010	4,682		9.6%
U.S. Decennial Census; 1899 (shown as 1900) 1910-1930; 1930-1950 1980-2000 2010

== See also ==
- List of communities in Puerto Rico
