= Carreras (surname) =

Carreras is a surname of Spanish and Portuguese origin. Notable people with the surname include:

- Amanda Carreras (born 1990), Gibraltarian tennis player
- Dionisio Carreras (1890–1949), Spanish long-distance runner
- Enrique Carreras (1925–1995), Peruvian-Argentine filmmaker
- Francesc de Carreras (born 1943), Spanish jurist and political activist, son of Narcís de Carreras
- Francisco de las Carreras (1809–1870), Argentine lawyer, judge and politician
- Georgina Carreras (born 1989), Spanish football player
- Gonzalo Carreras (born 1989), Argentine sprint canoeist
- James Carreras (1909–1990), British film producer
- Joaquim Carreras (1894–1968), Spanish philosopher, brother of Tomàs Carreras
- Joan Carreras (born 1962), Spanish journalist and writer
- Jofre Carreras (born 2001), Spanish footballer
- José Carreras (born 1946), Spanish opera singer
- Juan Manuel Carreras (born 1962), Mexican politician
- Julio Carreras (h), Argentine writer, artist and musician
- Lluís Carreras (born 1972), Spanish football player and coach
- Narcís de Carreras, Spanish lawyer and former president of Barcelona FC
- Mario Carreras (born 1966), Argentine rugby union player
- Mateo Carreras (born 1999), Argentine rugby union player
- Mercedes Carreras (born 1940), Argentine actress
- Michael Carreras (1927––1994), British film producer and director, son of James Carreras
- Olivier Carreras, French filmmaker and TV presenter
- Ricardo Carreras (born 1949), U.S. American boxer
- Saguier Carreras, Paraguayan football (soccer) player
- Santiago Carreras (born 1998), Argentine rugby union player
- Tomàs Carreras (1879–1954), Spanish philosopher and politician, brother of Joaquim Carreras

== See also ==
- Carrera (surname)
