= Puerto Rico Highway 109 =

Highway in Puerto Rico

Highway 109
- Ruta 109

Route information
- Maintained by Puerto Rico DTPW
- Length: 29.5 km (18.3 mi)

Major junctions
- West end: PR-2 / PR-115 in Añasco Abajo
- PR-402 in Añasco barrio-pueblo; PR-430 in Carreras; PR-406 in Espino; PR-4109 in Miraflores–Cidra; PR-4420 in Corcovada; PR-108 in Corcovada; PR-4020 in Corcovada; PR-4423 in Alto Sano; PR-497 in Culebrinas–Pozas; PR-125 in Bahomamey
- East end: PR-119 in San Sebastián barrio-pueblo

Location
- Country: United States
- Territory: Puerto Rico
- Municipalities: Añasco, San Sebastián

Highway system
- Roads in Puerto Rico; List
← PR-108	→ PR-110

Puerto Rico Highway 109 (PR-109) is a rural road that travels from Añasco, Puerto Rico to San Sebastián. This road extends from its junction with PR-2 and PR-115 west of downtown Añasco and ends at PR-119 in downtown San Sebastián.

Puerto Rico Highway 109 by municipality

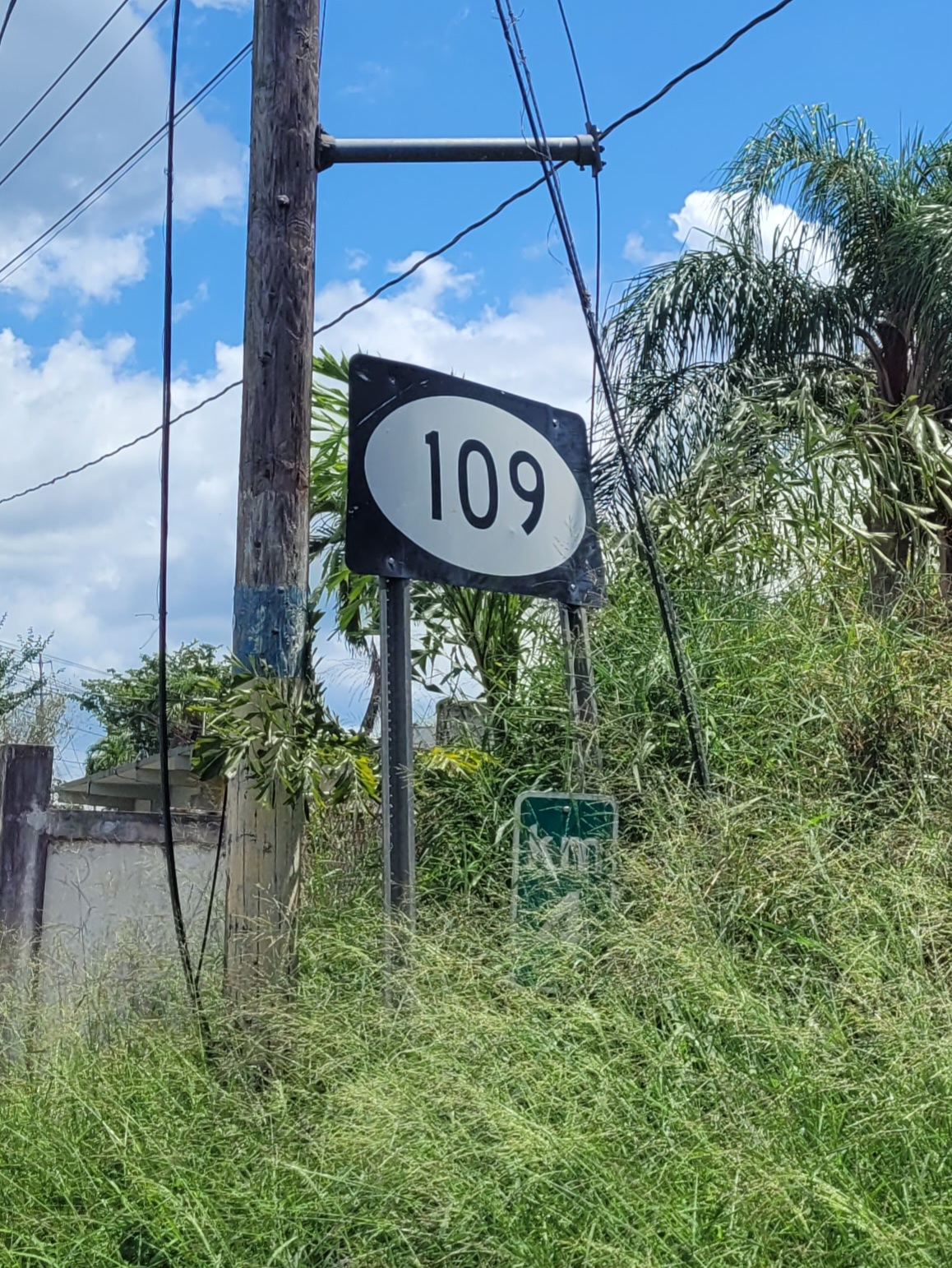
Eastbound sign in Añasco

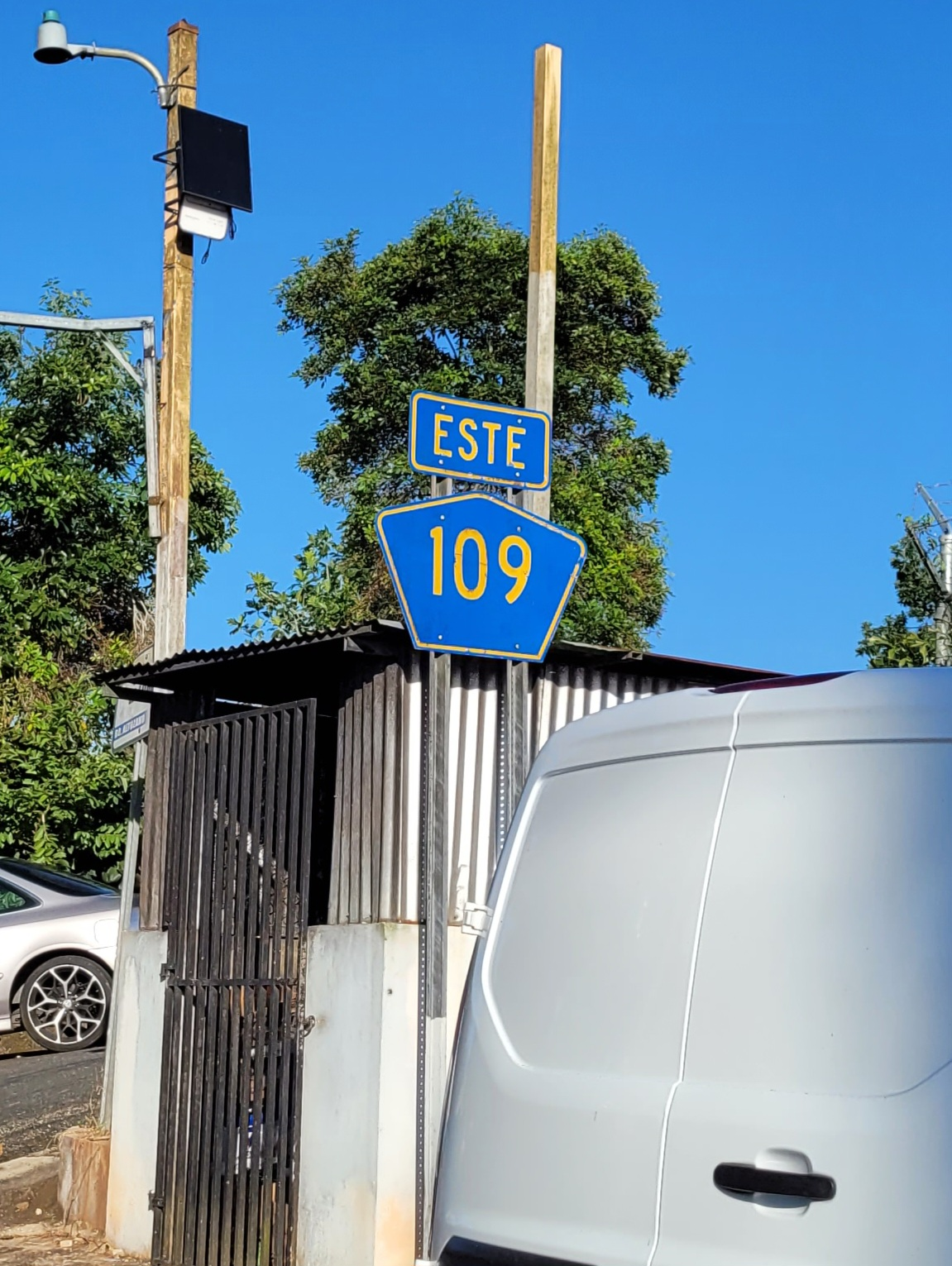
Eastbound sign in San Sebastián

== Major intersections ==
Municipality	Location	km	mi	Destinations	Notes
Añasco	Añasco Abajo	0.0	0.0	PR-115 west (Avenida Profesor Tomás Bonilla Feliciano) – Rincón	Continuation beyond PR-2
Añasco	Añasco Abajo	0.0	0.0	PR-2 (Expreso Rafael Hernández, "El Jibarito") – Mayagüez, Aguadilla	Western terminus of PR-109 and southern terminus of PR-115
Añasco	Añasco barrio-pueblo	3.3	2.1	PR-402 west (Calle Victoria) – Añasco	One-way street
Añasco	Carreras	4.8– 4.9	3.0– 3.0	PR-430 – Ovejas	
Añasco	Espino	6.1– 6.2	3.8– 3.9	PR-406 – Cidra	
Añasco	Miraflores–Cidra line	8.8	5.5	PR-4109 – Cerro Gordo	
Añasco	Corcovada	14.3	8.9	PR-4420 – Corcovada	
Añasco	Corcovada	18.2	11.3	PR-108 south – Las Marías, Mayagüez	
Añasco	Corcovada	18.4	11.4	PR-4020 – Corcovada	Former PR-4420
San Sebastián	Alto Sano	23.7	14.7	PR-4423 – Plata	
San Sebastián	Culebrinas–Pozas line	26.4	16.4	PR-497 – Pozas	
San Sebastián	Bahomamey	29.0	18.0	PR-125 (Avenida Emérito Estrada Rivera) – Moca, Lares	
San Sebastián	San Sebastián barrio-pueblo	29.3– 29.4	18.2– 18.3	PR-125 Spur (Calle Ramón Emeterio Betances) – Moca	One-way street
San Sebastián	San Sebastián barrio-pueblo	29.5	18.3	PR-119 south (Calle Eugenio María de Hostos) – Las Marías	Eastern terminus of PR-109; one-way street; northbound access via Calle Severo Arana
1.000 mi = 1.609 km; 1.000 km = 0.621 mi
