= Carreras =

Carreras may refer to:

== Places ==
- Carreras, Durango, Mexico
- Carreras, Santa Fe, Argentina
- Carreras, Añasco, Puerto Rico, a barrio
- Carreras, Arecibo, Puerto Rico, a barrio

== Other uses ==
- Carreras (surname)
- Carreras Tobacco Company and its factory, now known as Greater London House

== See also ==
- Carrera (disambiguation)
