= Río Arriba, Añasco, Puerto Rico =

Barrio of Puerto Rico

Río Arriba
- Barrio
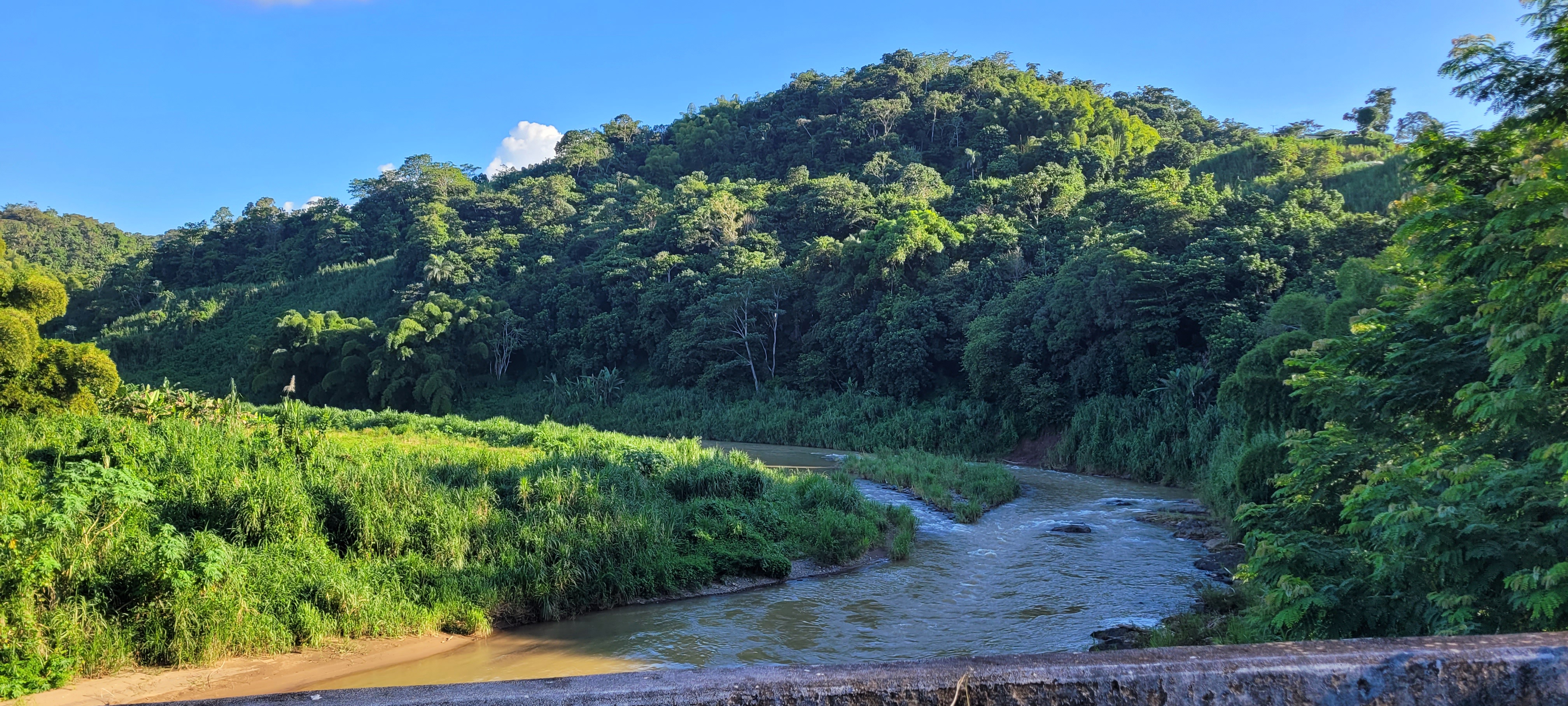
- Río Grande de Añasco between Corcovada and Río Arriba

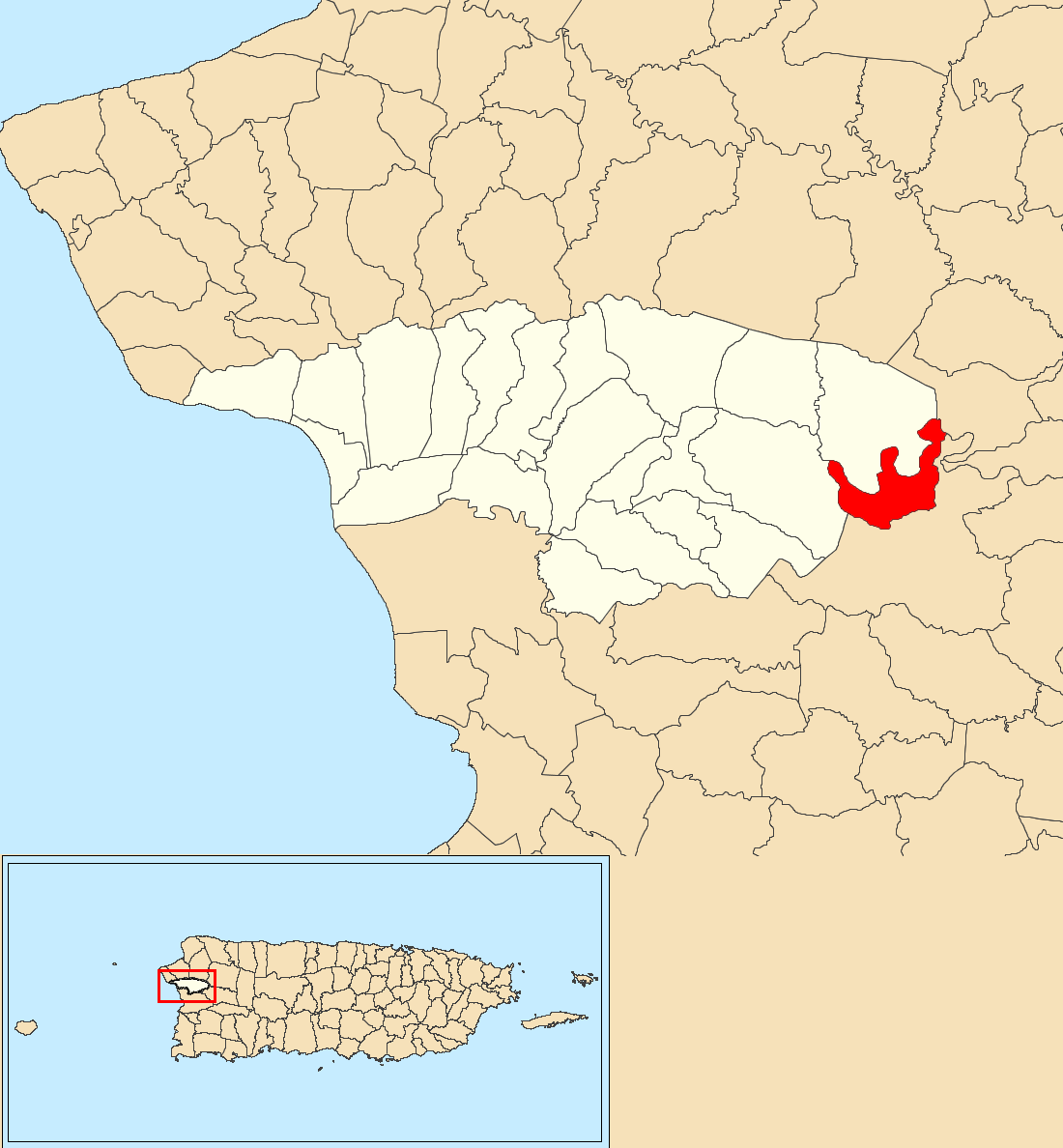
- Location of Río Arriba within the municipality of Añasco shown in red

- Location of Puerto Rico
- Coordinates: 18°16′26″N 67°02′54″W
- Commonwealth: Puerto Rico
- Municipality: Añasco

Area
  - Total: 1.40 sq mi (3.6 km^{2})
  - Land: 1.35 sq mi (3.5 km^{2})
  - Water: 0.05 sq mi (0.13 km^{2})
- Elevation: 535 ft (163 m)

Population (2010)
  - Total: 138
  - Density: 102.2/sq mi (39.5/km^{2})
- Source: 2010 Census
- Time zone: UTC−4 (AST)

Río Arriba is a barrio in the municipality of Añasco, Puerto Rico. Its population in 2010 was 138.

== History ==
Río Arriba was in Spain's gazetteers until Puerto Rico was ceded by Spain in the aftermath of the Spanish–American War under the terms of the Treaty of Paris of 1898 and became an unincorporated territory of the United States. In 1899, the United States Department of War conducted a census of Puerto Rico finding that the combined population of Río Arriba, Casey Abajo and Cercado barrios was 1,019.

Historical population
Census	Pop.	Note	%±
1910	286		—
1920	207		−27.6%
1930	211		1.9%
1940	150		−28.9%
1950	277		84.7%
1960	140		−49.5%
1970	82		−41.4%
1980	117		42.7%
1990	81		−30.8%
2000	176		117.3%
2010	138		−21.6%
U.S. Decennial Census; 1900 (N/A) 1910-1930; 1930-1950 1980-2000 2010

== See also ==
- List of communities in Puerto Rico
- List of barrios and sectors of Añasco, Puerto Rico
