= Espino, Añasco, Puerto Rico =

Barrio of Puerto Rico

Espino
- Barrio
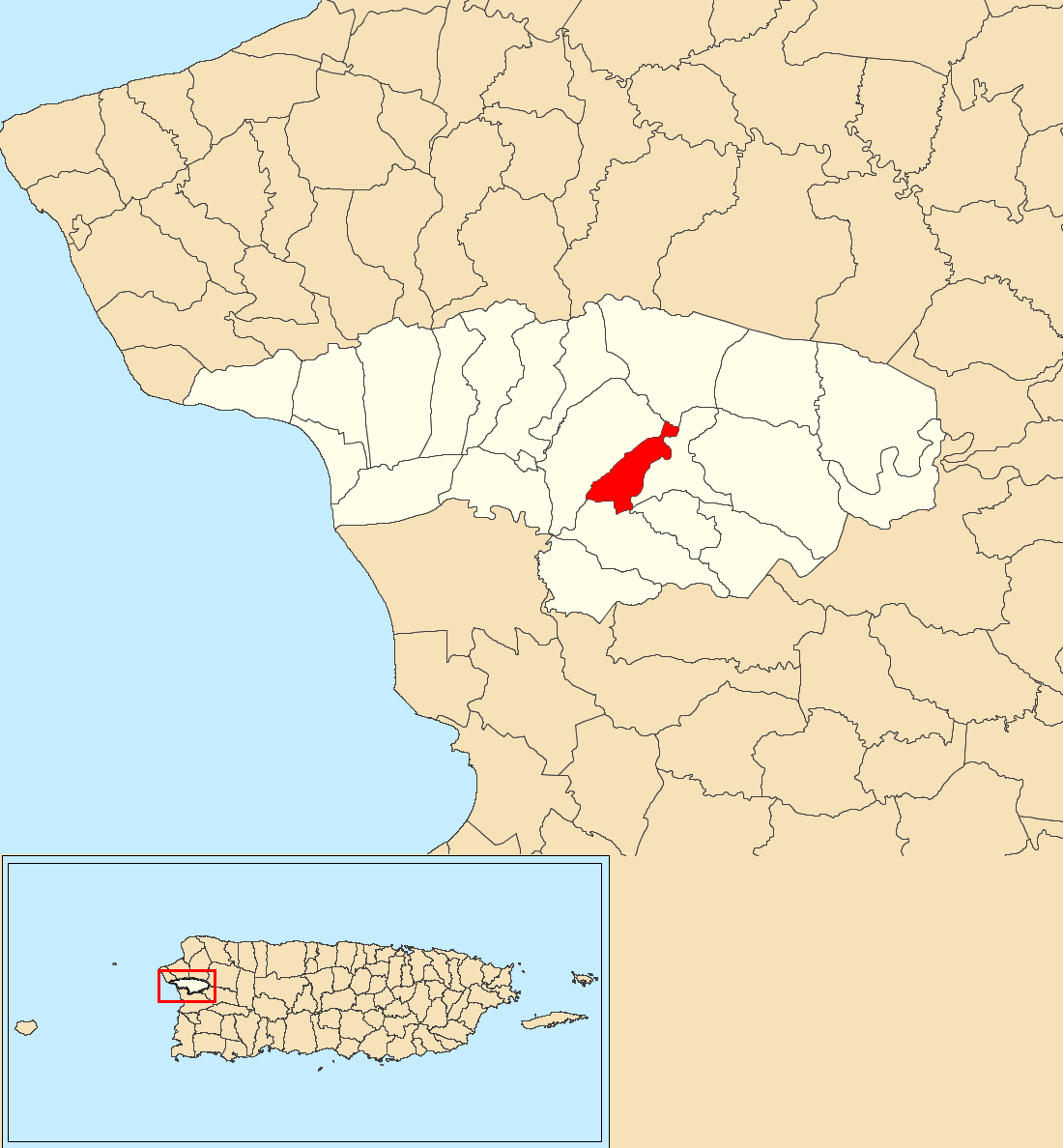
- Location of Espino within the municipality of Añasco shown in red

- Location of Puerto Rico
- Coordinates: 18°16′57″N 67°06′53″W
- Commonwealth: Puerto Rico
- Municipality: Añasco

Area
  - Total: 0.79 sq mi (2.0 km^{2})
  - Land: 0.78 sq mi (2.0 km^{2})
  - Water: 0.01 sq mi (0.026 km^{2})
- Elevation: 154 ft (47 m)

Population (2010)
  - Total: 1,407
  - Density: 1,803.8/sq mi (696.5/km^{2})
- Source: 2010 Census
- Time zone: UTC−4 (AST)

Espino is a barrio in the municipality of Añasco, Puerto Rico. Its population in 2010 was 1,407.

== History ==
Espino was in Spain's gazetteers until Puerto Rico was ceded by Spain in the aftermath of the Spanish–American War under the terms of the Treaty of Paris of 1898 and became an unincorporated territory of the United States. In 1899, the United States Department of War conducted a census of Puerto Rico finding that the combined population of Espino, Cidra and Carreras barrios was 1,281.

Historical population
Census	Pop.	Note	%±
1910	361		—
1920	223		−38.2%
1930	416		86.5%
1940	494		18.8%
1950	815		65.0%
1960	982		20.5%
1970	1,080		10.0%
1980	1,324		22.6%
1990	1,421		7.3%
2000	1,646		15.8%
2010	1,407		−14.5%
U.S. Decennial Census; 1900 (N/A) 1910-1930; 1930-1950 1980-2000 2010

== Sectors ==
Barrios (which are like minor civil divisions) in turn are further subdivided into smaller local populated place areas/units called sectores (sectors in English). The types of sectores may vary, from normally sector to urbanización to reparto to barriada to residencial, among others.

The following sectors are in Espino barrio:

Carretera 109, Parcelas de Josefa, Sector Solares Lorenzo Rivera, Sector Valle Hermoso, and Urbanización Alturas de Añasco.

== See also ==
- List of communities in Puerto Rico
- List of barrios and sectors of Añasco, Puerto Rico
