= Cidra, Añasco, Puerto Rico =

Barrio of Puerto Rico

Cidra
- Barrio
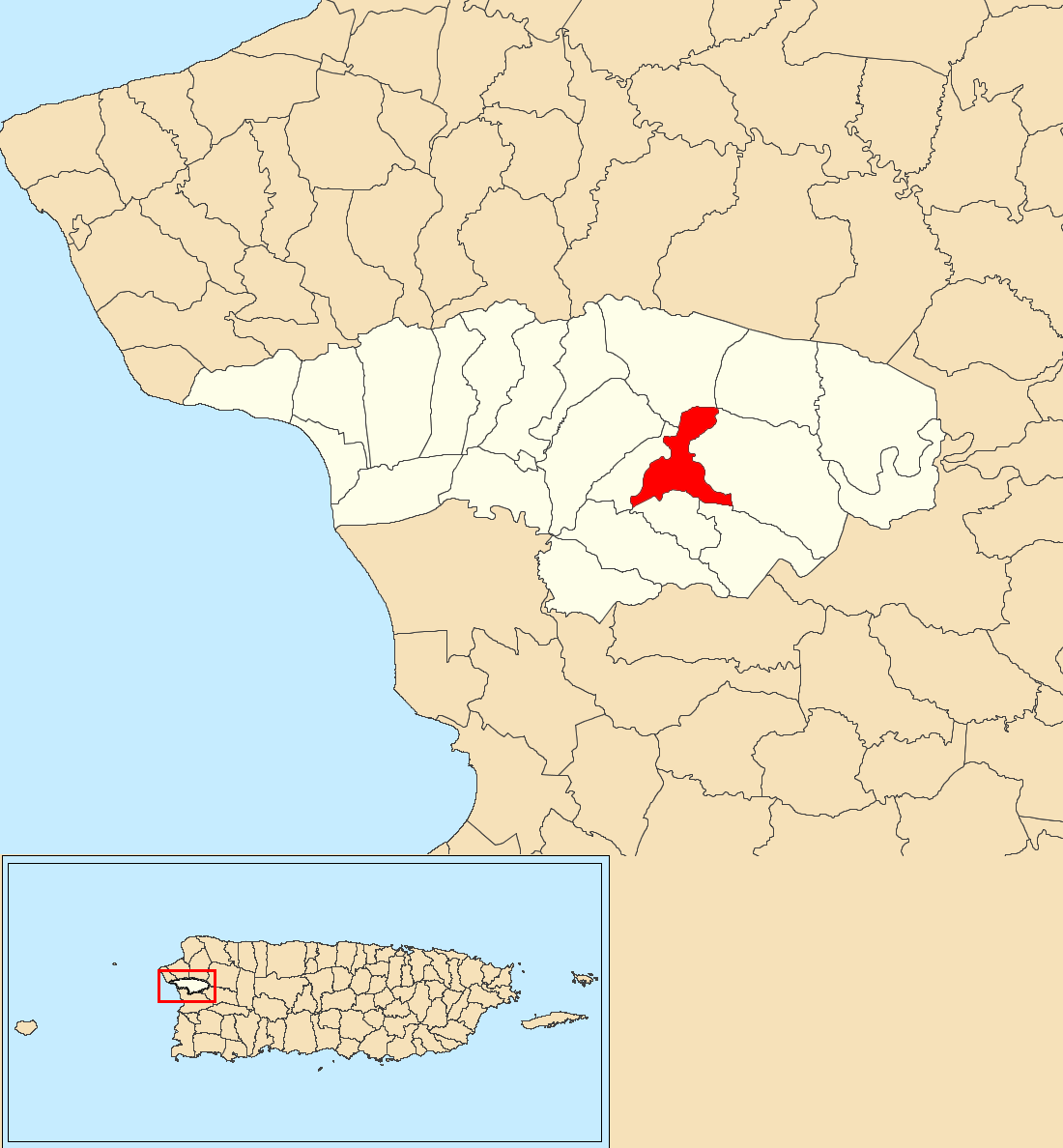
- Location of Cidra within the municipality of Añasco shown in red

- Location of Puerto Rico
- Coordinates: 18°16′59″N 67°06′11″W
- Commonwealth: Puerto Rico
- Municipality: Añasco

Area
  - Total: 1.10 sq mi (2.8 km^{2})
  - Land: 1.07 sq mi (2.8 km^{2})
  - Water: 0.03 sq mi (0.078 km^{2})
- Elevation: 43 ft (13 m)

Population (2010)
  - Total: 326
  - Density: 307.5/sq mi (118.7/km^{2})
- Source: 2010 Census
- Time zone: UTC−4 (AST)

Cidra is a barrio in the municipality of Añasco, Puerto Rico. Its population in 2010 was 326.

== History ==
Cidra was in Spain's gazetteers until Puerto Rico was ceded by Spain in the aftermath of the Spanish–American War under the terms of the Treaty of Paris of 1898 and became an unincorporated territory of the United States. In 1899, the United States Department of War conducted a census of Puerto Rico finding that the combined population of Cidra, Carreras and Espino barrios was 1,281.

Historical population
Census	Pop.	Note	%±
1910	321		—
1920	189		−41.1%
1930	296		56.6%
1940	367		24.0%
1950	333		−9.3%
1960	299		−10.2%
1970	228		−23.7%
1980	406		78.1%
1990	413		1.7%
2000	332		−19.6%
2010	326		−1.8%
U.S. Decennial Census; 1900 (N/A) 1910-1930; 1930-1950 1980-2000 2010

== Sectors ==
Barrios (which are, in contemporary times, roughly comparable to minor civil divisions) in turn are further subdivided into smaller local populated place areas/units called sectores (sectors in English). The types of sectores may vary, from normally sector to urbanización to reparto to barriada to residencial, among others.

The following sectors are in Cidra barrio:

Carretera 109, Sector La Cuchilla, and Sector La Sabana.

== See also ==
- List of communities in Puerto Rico
- List of barrios and sectors of Añasco, Puerto Rico
