= Miraflores, Añasco, Puerto Rico =

Barrio of Puerto Rico

Miraflores
- Barrio
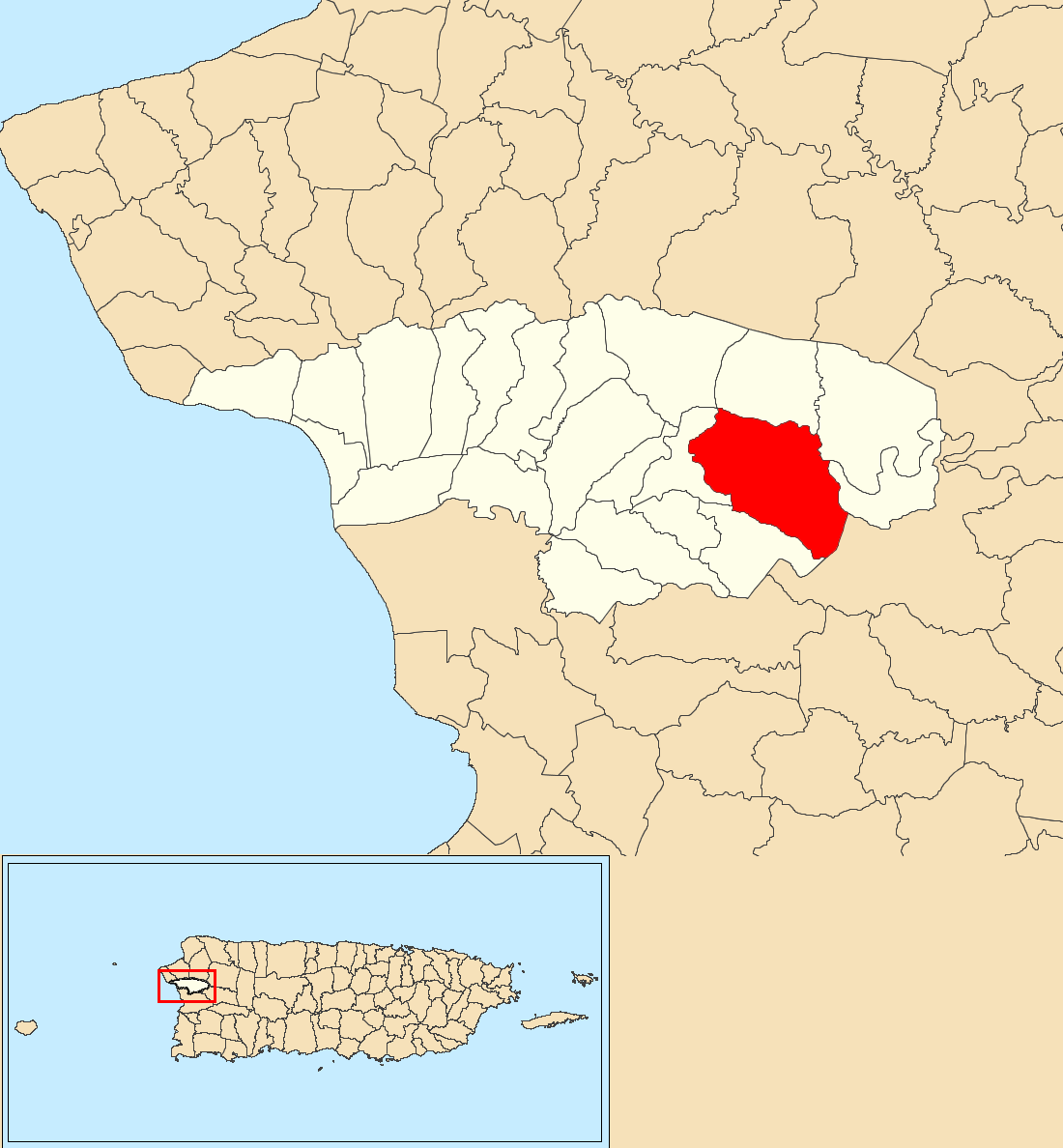
- Location of Miraflores within the municipality of Añasco shown in red

- Location of Puerto Rico
- Coordinates: 18°16′45″N 67°04′49″W
- Commonwealth: Puerto Rico
- Municipality: Añasco

Area
  - Total: 3.71 sq mi (9.6 km^{2})
  - Land: 3.65 sq mi (9.5 km^{2})
  - Water: 0.06 sq mi (0.16 km^{2})
- Elevation: 151 ft (46 m)

Population (2010)
  - Total: 567
  - Density: 155.3/sq mi (60.0/km^{2})
- Source: 2010 Census
- Time zone: UTC−4 (AST)

Miraflores is a barrio in the municipality of Añasco, Puerto Rico. Its population in 2010 was 567.

== Hurricane Maria ==
The barrio of Miraflores became inaccessible when Hurricane Maria hit Puerto Rico on September 20, 2017 and caused landslides and destruction. Five months after the hurricane struck, engineers and officials were grappling with the massive amounts of repairs that were needed to PR-109 in Añasco and multiple other areas of this barrio and of Añasco, as a whole.

== Features and demographics ==
Historical population
Census	Pop.	Note	%±
1930	641		—
1940	918		43.2%
1950	941		2.5%
1960	637		−32.3%
1970	648		1.7%
1980	764		17.9%
1990	619		−19.0%
2000	730		17.9%
2010	567		−22.3%
U.S. Decennial Census; 1930-1950 1980-2000 2010

== Sectors ==
Barrios (which are, in contemporary times, roughly comparable to minor civil divisions) in turn are further subdivided into smaller local populated place areas/units called sectores (sectors in English). The types of sectores may vary, from normally sector to urbanización to reparto to barriada to residencial, among others.

The following sectors are in Miraflores barrio:

Carretera 109.

== Special communities ==
Since 2001 when law 1-2001 was passed, measures have been taken to identify and address the high levels of poverty and the lack of resources and opportunities affecting specific communities in Puerto Rico. Initially there were 686 places that made the list. By 2008, there were 742 places on the list of Comunidades especiales de Puerto Rico. The places on the list are barrios, communities, sectors, or neighborhoods and in 2004, Miraflores had made the list.

== See also ==
- List of communities in Puerto Rico
- List of barrios and sectors of Añasco, Puerto Rico
