= Culebrinas =

Barrio of San Sebastián, Puerto Rico

- Barrio
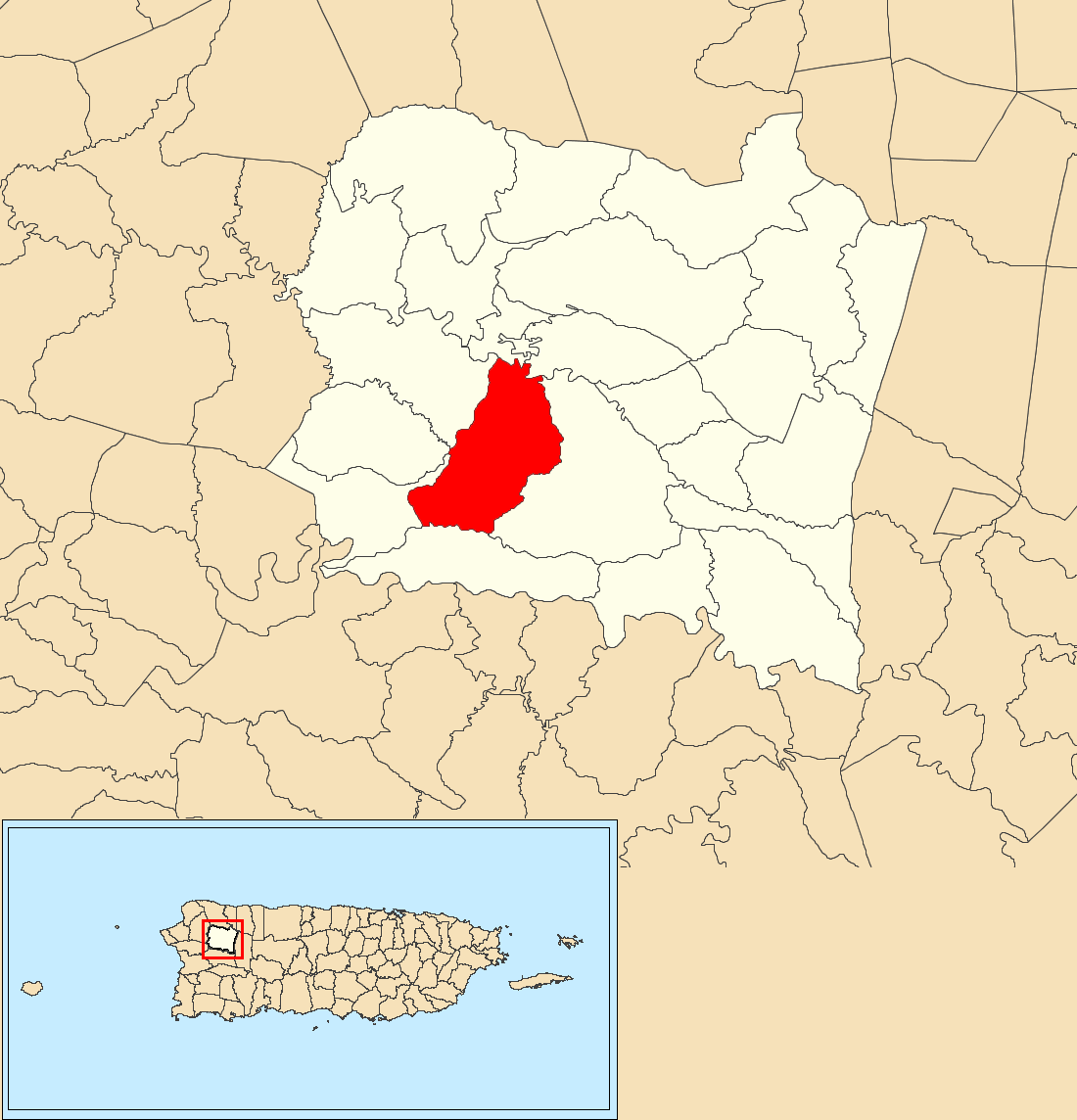
- Location of Culebrinas within the municipality of San Sebastián shown in red

- Location of Puerto Rico
- Coordinates: 18°18′37″N 66°59′49″W
- Commonwealth: Puerto Rico
- Municipality: San Sebastián

Area
  - Total: 3.73 sq mi (9.7 km^{2})
  - Land: 3.73 sq mi (9.7 km^{2})
  - Water: 0 sq mi (0 km^{2})
- Elevation: 535 ft (163 m)

Population (2020)
  - Total: 3,398
  - Density: 1,015.3/sq mi (392.0/km^{2})
- Source: 2020 Census
- Time zone: UTC−4 (AST)

Culebrinas is a barrio in the municipality of San Sebastián, Puerto Rico. Its population in 2020 was 3,398.

== History ==
Culebrinas was in Spain's gazetteers until Puerto Rico was ceded by Spain in the aftermath of the Spanish–American War under the terms of the Treaty of Paris of 1898 and became an unincorporated territory of the United States. In 1899, the United States Department of War conducted a census of Puerto Rico finding that the combined population of Pozas barrio and Culebrinas barrios was 1,008.

Historical population
Census	Pop.	Note	%±
1910	589		—
1920	685		16.3%
1930	793		15.8%
1940	826		4.2%
1950	1,610		94.9%
1960	1,421		−11.7%
1970	1,247		−12.2%
1980	2,024		62.3%
1990	3,248		60.5%
2000	4,006		23.3%
2010	3,787		−5.5%
2020	3,398		−10.3%
U.S. Decennial Census; 1900 (N/A) 1910-1930; 1930-1950 1980-2000 2010 2020

== Sectors ==
Barrios (which are, in contemporary times, roughly comparable to minor civil divisions) in turn are further subdivided into smaller local populated place areas/units called sectores (sectors in English). The types of sectores may vary, from sector, to urbanización, to reparto, to barriada, to residencial, among others.

The following sectors are in Culebrinas barrio:

Calle Torres Pino, Carretera 109, Sector Bernal, Sector Flores Rivera, Sector Juancho Román, Sector Lin Ríos, Sector Los Nobles, Sector Peter Hernández, Sector Pozas Central, Sector Quebrada Larga, Sector Toño Rosa, Sector Rincón, Urb. Ciudad de Oro, Urb. El Culebrinas, Urb. La Estancia, and Urb. Mansiones del Culebrinas.

== See also ==
- List of communities in Puerto Rico
- List of barrios and sectors of San Sebastián, Puerto Rico
