= Tomás Carreras Artau =

Tomàs Carreras i Artau (1879 in Girona – 1954 in Barcelona) was a Catalan philosopher, ethnologist and politician.

== Life and career ==
Tomàs Carreras was ethics professor in the University of Barcelona from 1912 until 1949. He set up the Archive of Ethnography and Folklore of Catalonia. Moreover, he was member of the Academy of Good Letters of Barcelona. Together with Jaume Serra i Húnter and Ramon Turró i Darder, he founded in 1923 the Catalan Society of Filosophy, which depended on the Institute of Catalan Studies.

He and his brother Joaquim Carreras i Artau received the prize of the Spanish Association for the Progress os Sciences for the publication between 1939 and 1943 of the History of Spanish Philosophy. Christian Philosophy from the 13th century until the 15th century (in Spanish). In 1946, he became the first president of the Institute of Studies from Girona and editor of the Annals of the Institute of Studies from Girona.

Politically, he was activist of the Lliga Regionalista and in the elections for the Catalan Parliament of 1932 he was chosen as MP for the province of Girona. After the Spanish Civil War, he was culture city councilor in the Barcelona city hall. He also took part in the creation of the Barcelona Symphony and Catalonia National Orchestra in 1944 and also some museums, such as the Ethnological Museum of Barcelona.
