= Casey Abajo, Añasco, Puerto Rico =

Barrio of Puerto Rico

Casey Abajo
- Barrio
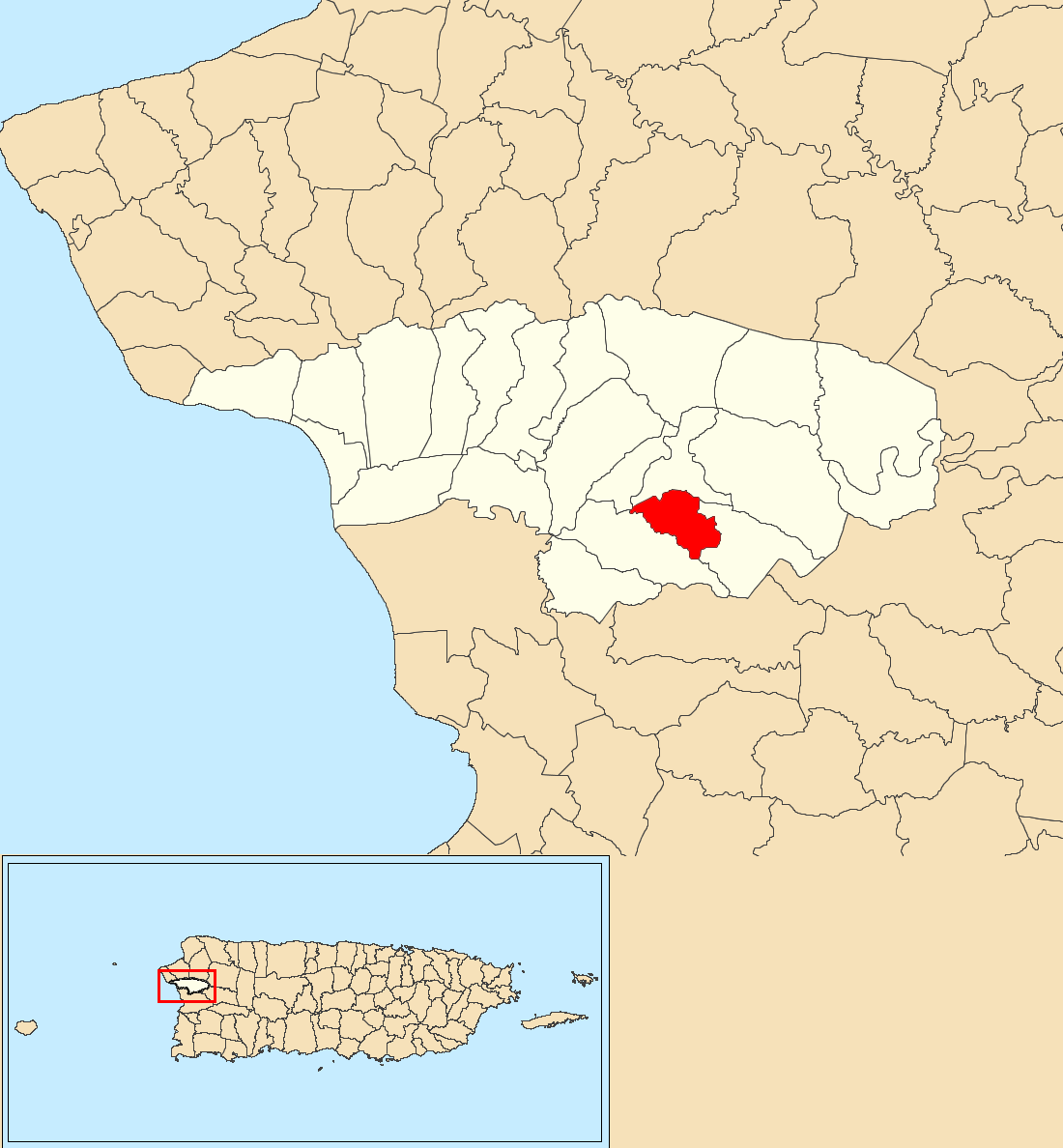
- Location of Casey Abajo within the municipality of Añasco shown in red

- Location of Puerto Rico
- Coordinates: 18°16′05″N 67°06′19″W
- Commonwealth: Puerto Rico
- Municipality: Añasco

Area
  - Total: 0.86 sq mi (2.2 km^{2})
  - Land: 0.86 sq mi (2.2 km^{2})
  - Water: 0.00 sq mi (0 km^{2})
- Elevation: 190 ft (58 m)

Population (2010)
  - Total: 103
  - Density: 119.8/sq mi (46.3/km^{2})
- Source: 2010 Census
- Time zone: UTC−4 (AST)

Casey Abajo is a barrio in the municipality of Añasco, Puerto Rico. Its population in 2010 was 103.

== History ==
Casey Abajo was in Spain's gazetteers until Puerto Rico was ceded by Spain in the aftermath of the Spanish–American War under the terms of the Treaty of Paris of 1898 and became an unincorporated territory of the United States. In 1899, the United States Department of War conducted a census of Puerto Rico finding that the combined population of Casey Abajo, Río Arriba and Cercado barrios was 1,019.

Historical population
Census	Pop.	Note	%±
1910	252		—
1920	250		−0.8%
1930	163		−34.8%
1940	209		28.2%
1950	166		−20.6%
1960	143		−13.9%
1970	58		−59.4%
1980	0		−100.0%
1990	64		—
2000	180		181.3%
2010	103		−42.8%
U.S. Decennial Census; 1900 (N/A) 1910-1930; 1930-1950 1980-2000 2010

== Sectors ==
Barrios (which are, in contemporary times, roughly comparable to minor civil divisions) in turn are further subdivided into smaller local populated place areas/units called sectores (sectors in English). The types of sectores may vary, from normally sector to urbanización to reparto to barriada to residencial, among others.

The following sectors are in Casey Abajo barrio:

Carretera 406 (both sides).

== See also ==
- List of communities in Puerto Rico
- List of barrios and sectors of Añasco, Puerto Rico
