= Pozas, San Sebastián, Puerto Rico =

Barrio of Puerto Rico

Pozas
- Barrio
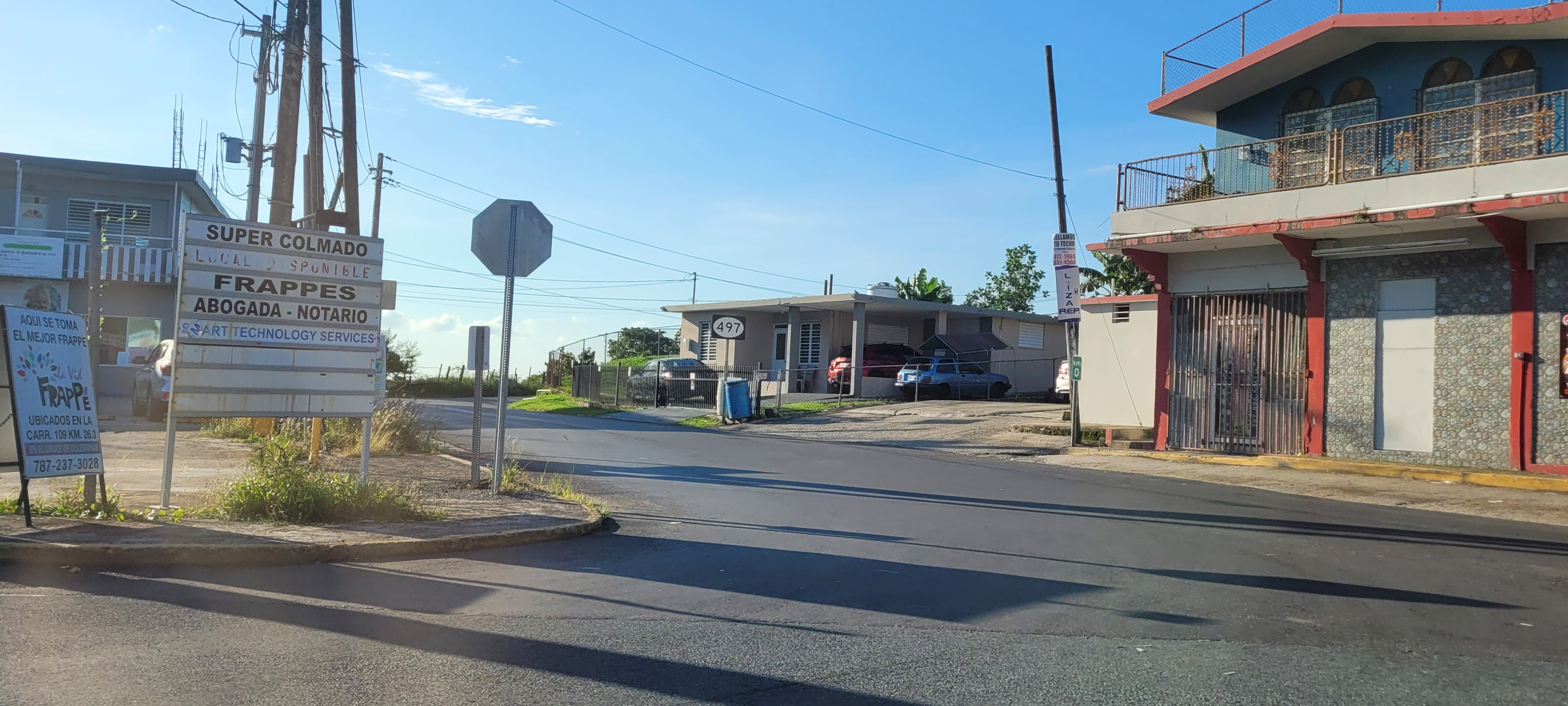
- Puerto Rico Highway 497 in Pozas

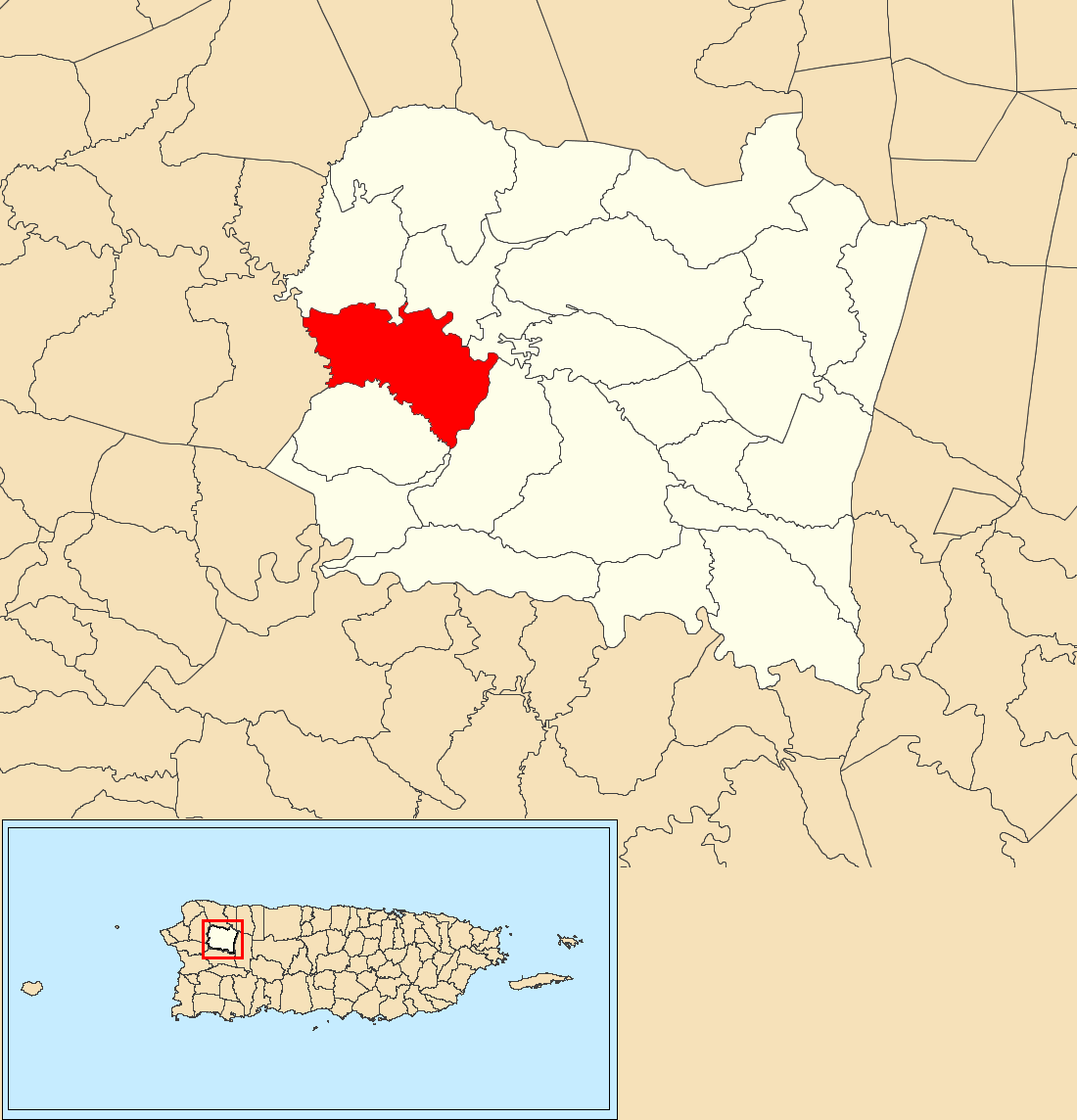
- Location of Pozas within the municipality of San Sebastián shown in red

- Location of Puerto Rico
- Coordinates: 18°19′58″N 67°01′06″W
- Commonwealth: Puerto Rico
- Municipality: San Sebastián

Area
  - Total: 3.82 sq mi (9.9 km^{2})
  - Land: 3.82 sq mi (9.9 km^{2})
  - Water: 0 sq mi (0 km^{2})
- Elevation: 279 ft (85 m)

Population (2010)
  - Total: 3,515
  - Density: 920.2/sq mi (355.3/km^{2})
- Source: 2010 Census
- Time zone: UTC−4 (AST)

Pozas is a barrio in the municipality of San Sebastián, Puerto Rico. Its population in 2010 was 3,515.

== History ==
Pozas was in Spain's gazetteers until Puerto Rico was ceded by Spain in the aftermath of the Spanish–American War under the terms of the Treaty of Paris of 1898 and became an unincorporated territory of the United States. In 1899, the United States Department of War conducted a census of Puerto Rico finding that the combined population of Pozas barrio and Culebrinas barrios was 1,008.

Historical population
Census	Pop.	Note	%±
1910	653		—
1920	820		25.6%
1930	899		9.6%
1940	1,201		33.6%
1950	1,932		60.9%
1960	1,746		−9.6%
1970	1,527		−12.5%
1980	2,469		61.7%
1990	2,782		12.7%
2000	3,713		33.5%
2010	3,515		−5.3%
U.S. Decennial Census; 1900 (N/A) 1910-1930; 1930-1950 1980-2000 2010

== Sectors ==
Barrios (which are, in contemporary times, roughly comparable to minor civil divisions) in turn are further subdivided into smaller local populated place areas/units called sectores (sectors in English). The types of sectores may vary, from normally sector to urbanización to reparto to barriada to residencial, among others.

The following sectors are in Pozas barrio:

Carretera 109, Carretera 424, Carretera 497, Reparto Feliciano, Sector Arvelo Rivera, Sector Colón, Sector Los Crespo, Sector Los González, Sector Los Reyes, Sector Los Rosado, Sector Los Traversos, Sector Méndez, Sector Ortiz, Sector Pozas Gardens, Sector Quintana, and Sector Valle Real.

== See also ==
- List of communities in Puerto Rico
- List of barrios and sectors of San Sebastián, Puerto Rico
