= Añasco barrio-pueblo =

Historical and administrative center (seat) of Añasco, Puerto Rico

Añasco barrio-pueblo Pueblo de Añasco
- Municipality seat
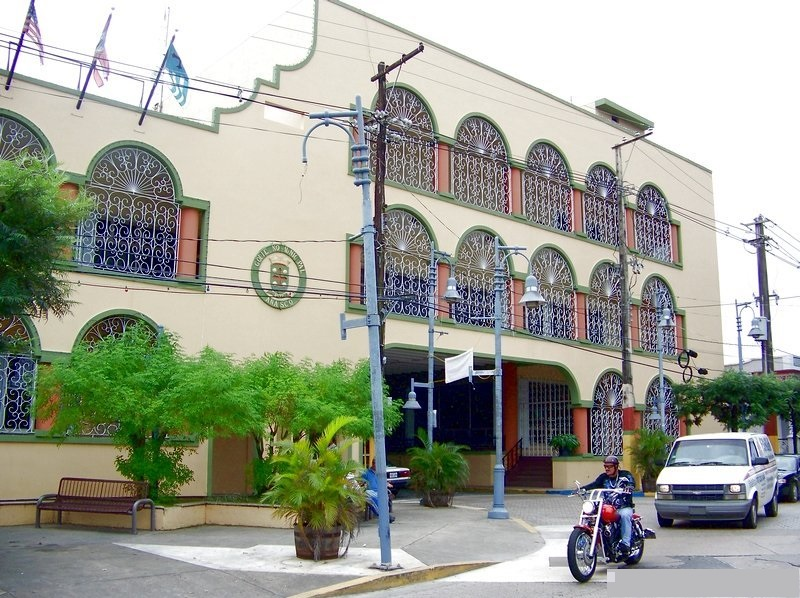
- Town hall in Añasco

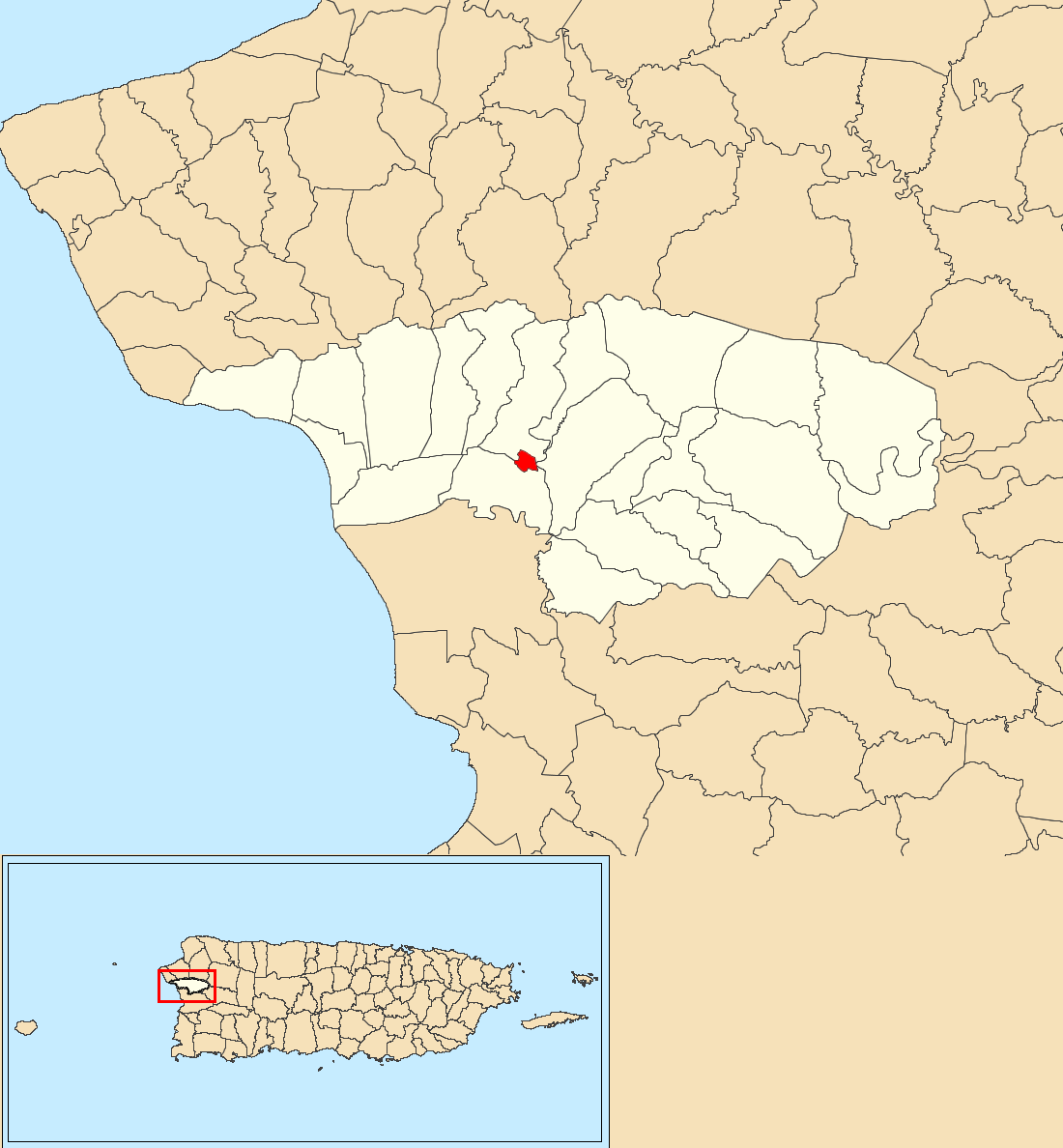
- Location of Añasco barrio-pueblo within the municipality of Añasco shown in red

- Location of Puerto Rico
- Coordinates: 18°16′58″N 67°08′29″W
- Commonwealth: Puerto Rico
- Municipality: Añasco

Area
  - Total: 0.09 sq mi (0.23 km^{2})
  - Land: 0.09 sq mi (0.23 km^{2})
  - Water: 0.00 sq mi (0 km^{2})
- Elevation: 30 ft (9.1 m)

Population (2010)
  - Total: 912
  - Density: 11,400/sq mi (4,400/km^{2})
- Source: 2010 Census
- Time zone: UTC−4 (AST)

Añasco barrio-pueblo is a barrio-pueblo and the administrative center (seat) of Añasco, a municipality of Puerto Rico. Its population in 2010 was 912.

As was customary in Spain, in Puerto Rico, the municipality has a barrio called pueblo which contains a central plaza, the municipal buildings (city hall), and a Catholic church. Fiestas patronales (patron saint festivals) are held in the central plaza every year.

== The central plaza and its church ==
The central plaza, or square, is a place for official and unofficial recreational events and a place where people can gather and socialize from dusk to dawn. The Laws of the Indies, Spanish law, which regulated life in Puerto Rico in the early 19th century, stated the plaza's purpose was for "the parties" (celebrations, festivities) (Spanish: a propósito para las fiestas), and that the square should be proportionally large enough for the number of neighbors (Spanish: grandeza proporcionada al número de vecinos). These Spanish regulations also stated that the streets nearby should be comfortable portals for passersby, protecting them from the elements: sun and rain.

Historical population
| Census | Pop. | Note | %± |
|---|---|---|---|
| 1910 | 3,064 | | — |
| 1920 | 2,552 | | −16.7% |
| 1930 | 3,064 | | 20.1% |
| 1940 | 3,286 | | 7.2% |
| 1950 | 3,463 | | 5.4% |
| 1960 | 2,068 | | −40.3% |
| 1970 | 0 | | −100.0% |
| 1980 | 1,482 | | — |
| 1990 | 1,168 | | −21.2% |
| 2000 | 1,038 | | −11.1% |
| 2010 | 912 | | −12.1% |
U.S. Decennial Census; 1900 (N/A) 1910-1930; 1930-1950 1980-2000 2010

Located across from the central plaza in Añasco barrio-pueblo is the Parroquia Nuestra San Antonio Abad, a Roman Catholic church which was inaugurated in 1919. The first church at the site was built in the early 1700s.

== Sectors ==
Barrios (which are like minor civil divisions) in turn are further subdivided into smaller local populated place areas/units called sectores (sectors in English). The types of sectores may vary, from normally sector to urbanización to reparto to barriada to residencial, among others.

The following sectors are in Añasco barrio-pueblo:

Casco del Pueblo, Edificio Diego Salcedo, Edificio Francis Villages Elderly, Edificio Victoria, Urbanización Carlos Feria, Urbanización Los Maestros, and Urbanización Villas de Añasco.

== Gallery ==
Places in Añasco barrio-pueblo:

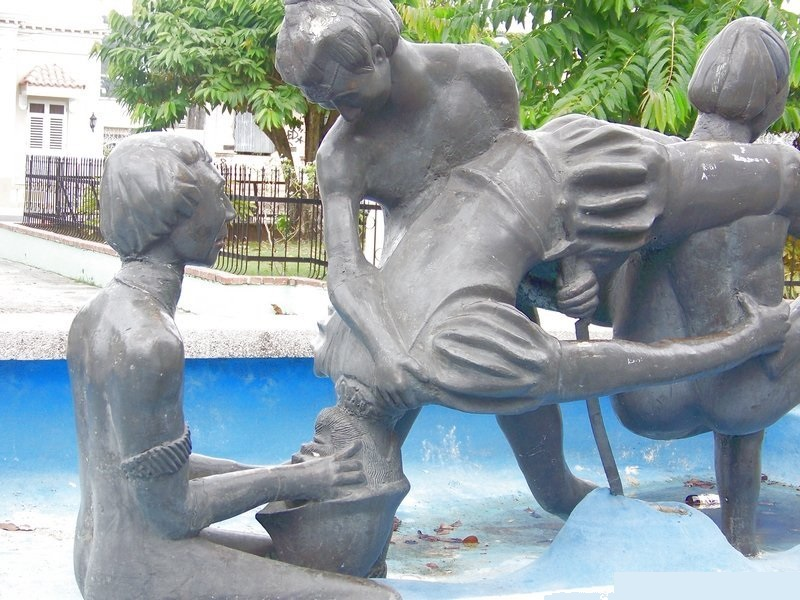
Legend of Diego Salcedo statue

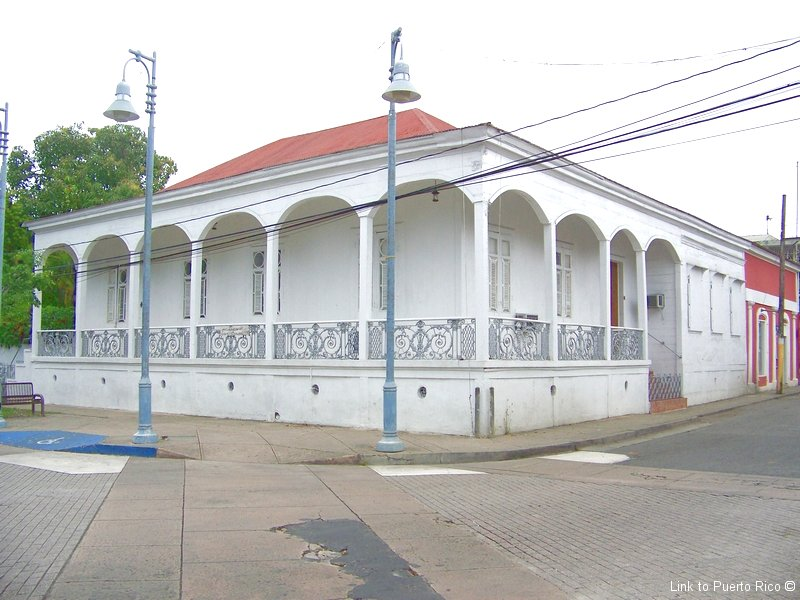
Casa Arrillaga

== See also ==
- List of communities in Puerto Rico
- List of barrios and sectors of Añasco, Puerto Rico
