= Corcovada, Añasco, Puerto Rico =

Barrio of Puerto Rico

Corcovada
- Barrio
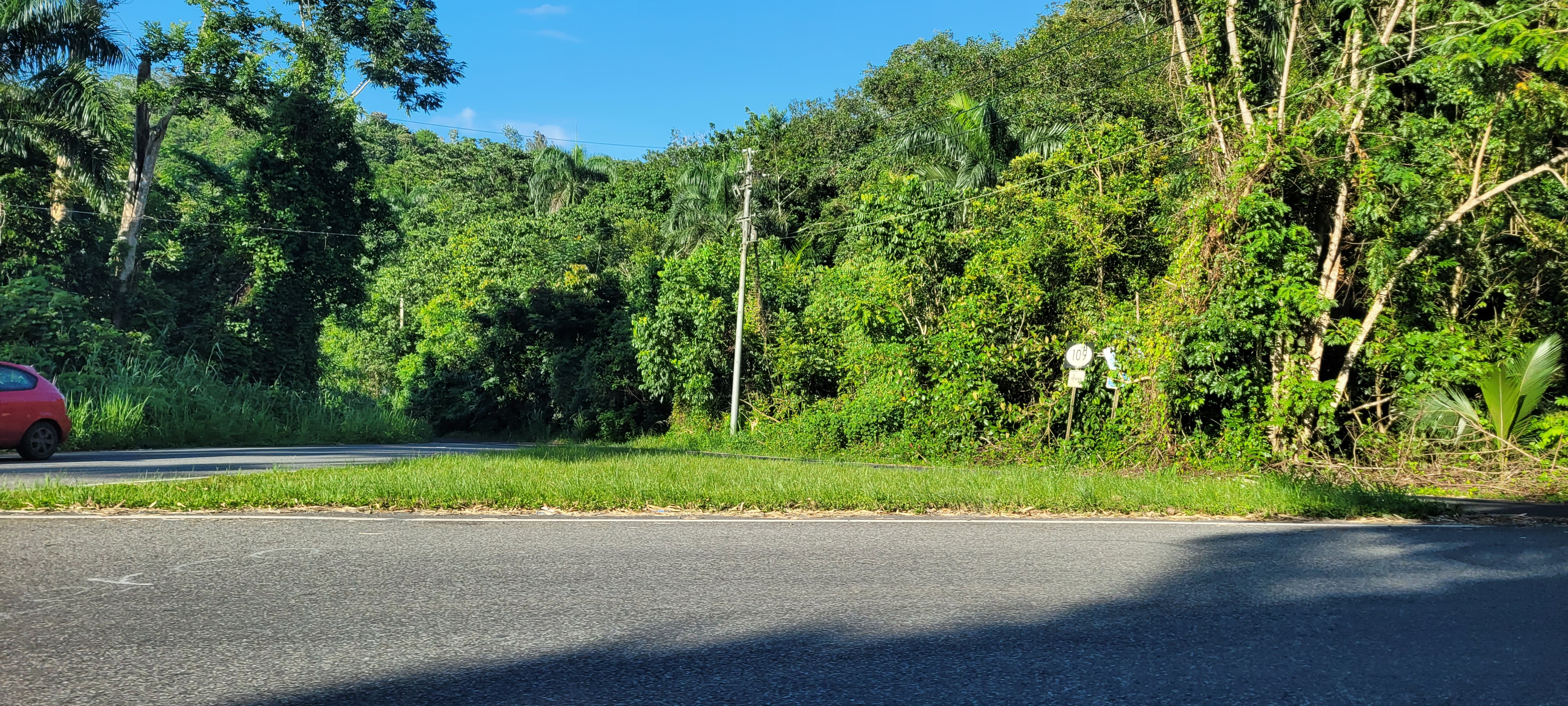
- Puerto Rico Highway 108 and Puerto Rico Highway 109 intersection in Corcovada

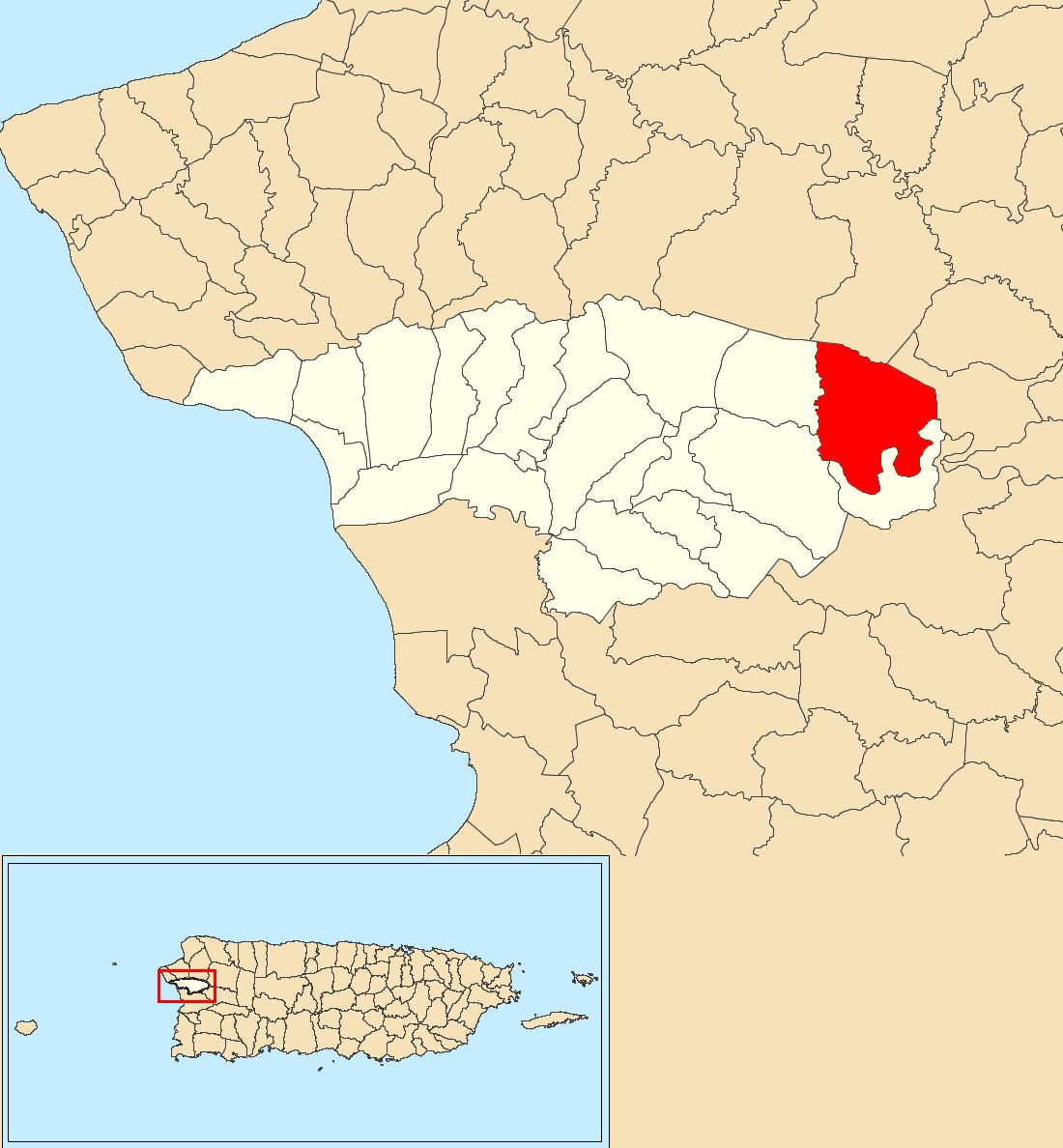
- Location of Corcovada within the municipality of Añasco shown in red

- Location of Puerto Rico
- Coordinates: 18°17′36″N 67°03′24″W
- Commonwealth: Puerto Rico
- Municipality: Añasco

Area
  - Total: 3.34 sq mi (8.7 km^{2})
  - Land: 3.30 sq mi (8.5 km^{2})
  - Water: 0.04 sq mi (0.10 km^{2})
- Elevation: 699 ft (213 m)

Population (2010)
  - Total: 627
  - Density: 190/sq mi (73/km^{2})
- Source: 2010 Census
- Time zone: UTC−4 (AST)

Corcovada is a barrio in the municipality of Añasco, Puerto Rico. Its population in 2010 was 627.

== History ==
Corcovada was in Spain's gazetteers until Puerto Rico was ceded by Spain in the aftermath of the Spanish–American War under the terms of the Treaty of Paris of 1898 and became an unincorporated territory of the United States. In 1899, the United States Department of War conducted a census of Puerto Rico finding that the combined population of Corcovada and Cerro Gordo barrios was 1,159.

Historical population
Census	Pop.	Note	%±
1910	474		—
1920	500		5.5%
1930	451		−9.8%
1940	576		27.7%
1950	579		0.5%
1960	476		−17.8%
1970	404		−15.1%
1980	551		36.4%
1990	450		−18.3%
2000	659		46.4%
2010	627		−4.9%
U.S. Decennial Census; 1900 (N/A) 1910-1930; 1930-1950 1980-2000 2010

== Sectors ==
Barrios (which are, in contemporary times, roughly comparable to minor civil divisions) in turn are further subdivided into smaller local populated place areas/units called sectores (sectors in English). The types of sectores may vary, from normally sector to urbanización to reparto to barriada to residencial, among others.

The following sectors are in Corcovada barrio:

Carretera 109.

== A "Special Community" ==
In 2014, Corcovada was one of the 742 places on the list of "Special Communities of Puerto Rico" Comunidades Especiales de Puerto Rico.

== See also ==
- List of communities in Puerto Rico
- List of barrios and sectors of Añasco, Puerto Rico
