= Carreras, Durango =

Town in Durango, Mexico

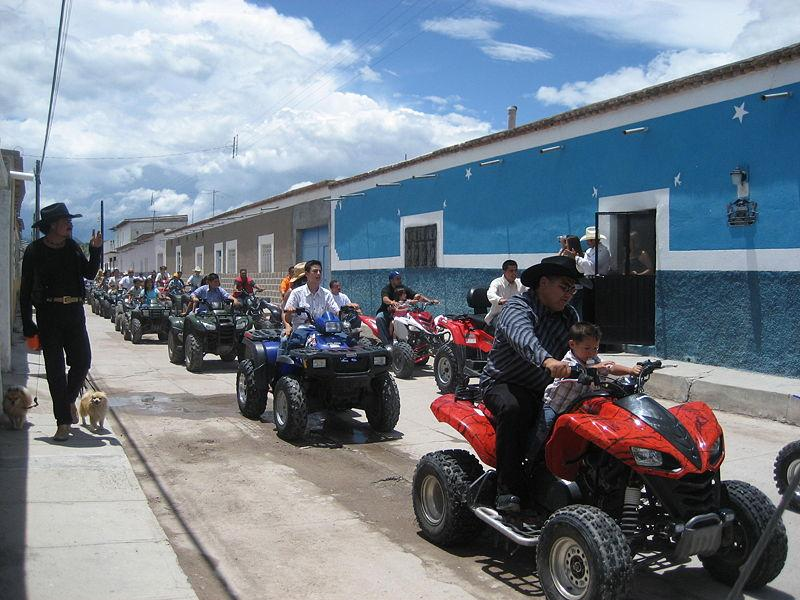
Carreras, Mexico

Carreras is a town in northwestern Durango, Mexico. The town is part of Tepehuanes Municipality. Carreras has a small population of mostly retired people, with tourism during the summer and the winter. Tourists mostly consist of the children of migrant parents from the United States mostly from California, Nevada, Illinois, Texas, Georgia and Virginia. Children usually ride ATVs around the town's dirt roads but recently the roads were paved. Occasionally, the town hosts various coleaderas (rodeos) in the town's lienzo charro.
