= Francesc de Carreras =

Spanish university professor (born 1943)

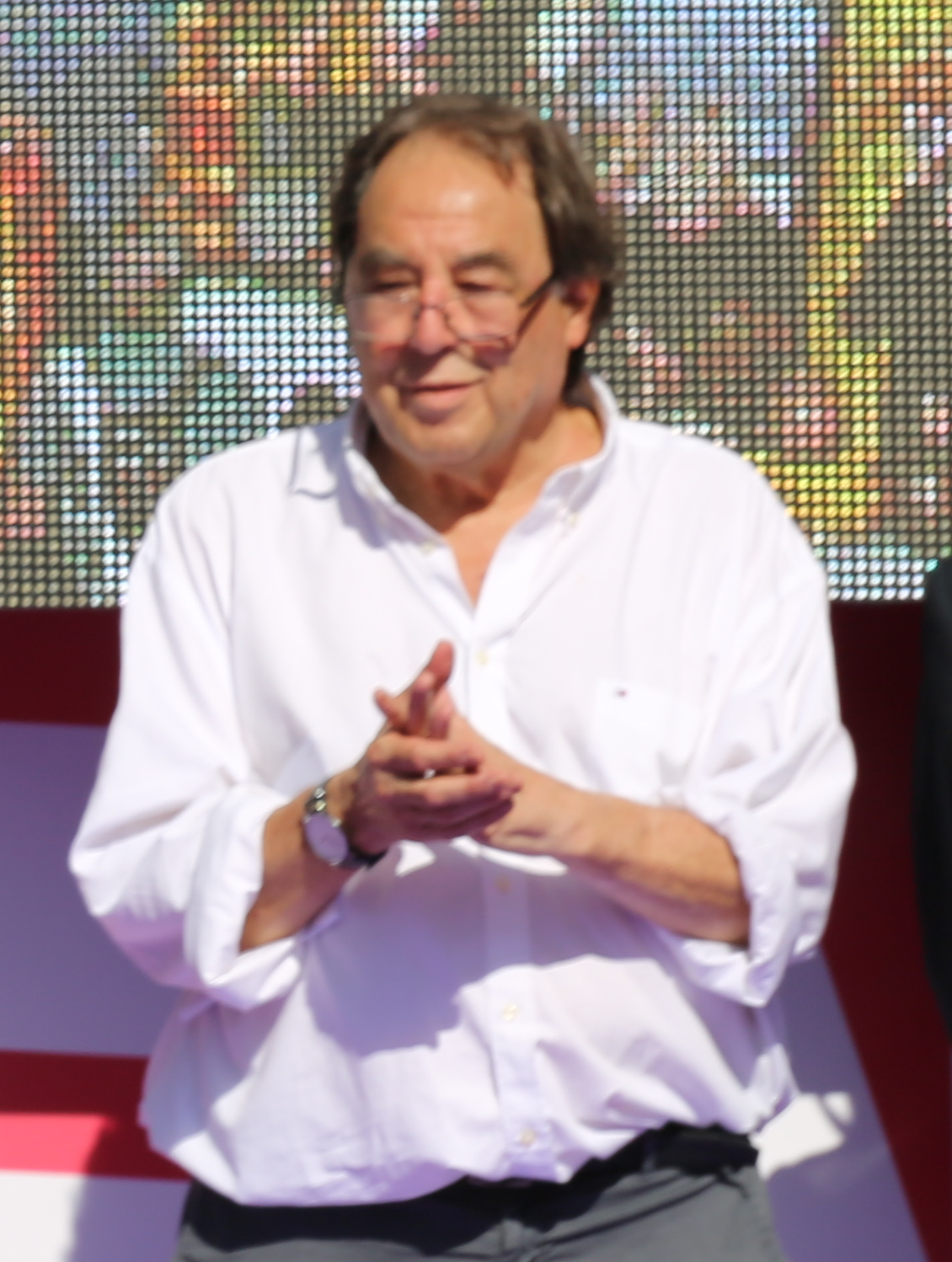
In October 2017

Francesc de Carreras Serra (born 1943) is a Spanish jurist.

== Biography ==
Born in 1943 in Barcelona, he is the son of Narcís de Carreras, who was personal secretary of Francesc Cambó and who would later become President of FC Barcelona (1968–1969) and President of La Caixa. He became a member of the clandestine Unified Socialist Party of Catalonia (PSUC) in 1967.

He left the PSUC in 1986 over concerns the party line was drifting towards Nationalist stances.

He was a prominent member of the Foro Babel, a civil forum created to denounce the language policy enforced by the Catalan regional governments presided by Jordi Pujol. In June 2005, he took part in the "For a new political party in Catalonia" manifesto that would pave the way for the later foundation of Citizens–Party of the Citizenry (Cs), (Note: Carreras directed some of the unfinished postgraduate courses the party leader Albert Rivera took at the UAB.) party of which Carreras has been referred as one of its "leading ideologists".

Tenured professor in possession of a Chair in Constitutional Law at the Autonomous University of Barcelona (UAB), he retired in September 2013. Elected as numerary member of the Royal Academy of Moral and Political Sciences in January 2015, he took possession of the medal number 27 on 15 November 2016, covering the vacant left by Manuel Jiménez de Parga (his PhD thesis supervisor), reading a speech titled Ensayos sobre el federalismo ("Essays about the Federalism").

Carreras has been a critic of the rightwing drift of Cs driven by party leader Albert Rivera (his former pupil), warning in 2019 that the later would be "putting alleged party interests ahead of the interests of Spain" and that Rivera had turned into a "capricious teenager".

In July 2019, Carreras, one of the party's founders, announced that he had left the party due to its stances against the PSOE and in favor of alliances with the far-right.

== Decorations ==
- Great Cross of the Order of Saint Raymond of Peñafort (2017)
