= Olivier Carreras =

- Occupations: Director, producer, TV presenter
- Website: http://www.oliviercarreras.com/

Olivier Carreras is a French documentary film director, producer and TV presenter.
