= Joaquim Carreras i Artau =

Joaquim Carreras i Artau (August 14, 1894 in Girona – August 12, 1968 in Tiana, Barcelona) was a Catalan philosopher.

He began his studies of scholastic philosophy at the Girona Seminary, where he stayed for ten years. Later he graduated from the University of Barcelona with BAs in Law and Philosophy. The thesis Ensayo sobre el voluntarismo de J. Duns Scoto gave him a Doctorate in Philosophy at the University of Madrid. He taught both at secondary schools and at the University of Barcelona from 1939 to 1964, first as a teaching assistant and, for the last twelve years, as professor.

He devoted himself intensely to the historical and philosophical research. Among his more important contributions, is his research on Ramon Llull and, especially, on Arnau de Vilanova.

These form part of the work of Historia de la filosofia española: filosofia cristiana de los siglos XIII al XV (published between 1934 and 1943), which he wrote in collaboration with his brother Tomàs Carreras i Artau, who was a philosopher and professor of Ethics. Both were awarded with the “Premio de la Asociación Española para el Progreso de las Ciencias”.

He was a member of the Science Section of the Institut d’Estudis Catalans (1944) and the Reial Academia de Bones Lletres of Barcelona (1955), Chairman of the Société Internationale pour l'Étude de la Philosophie Médiévale (1964) and teacher of the Escola Lul.lística of Mallorca.

Other work includes La filosofía universitaria en Catalunya durante el segundo tercio del s. XIX (1964) and a great number of studies on Arnau de Vilanova, along with critical editions of his spiritual works.
