= Carreras, Añasco, Puerto Rico =

Barrio of Puerto Rico

Carreras
- Barrio
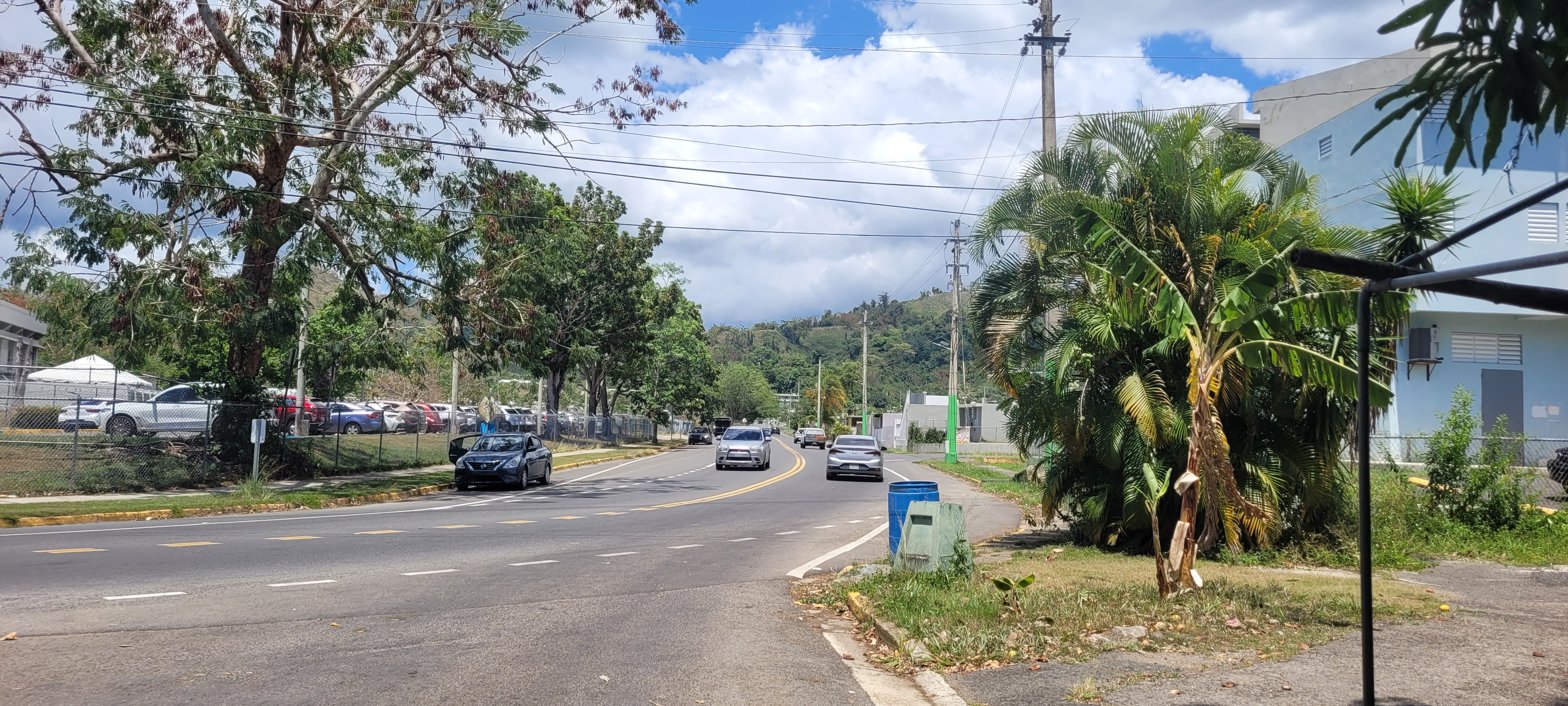
- Puerto Rico Highway 405 in Carreras

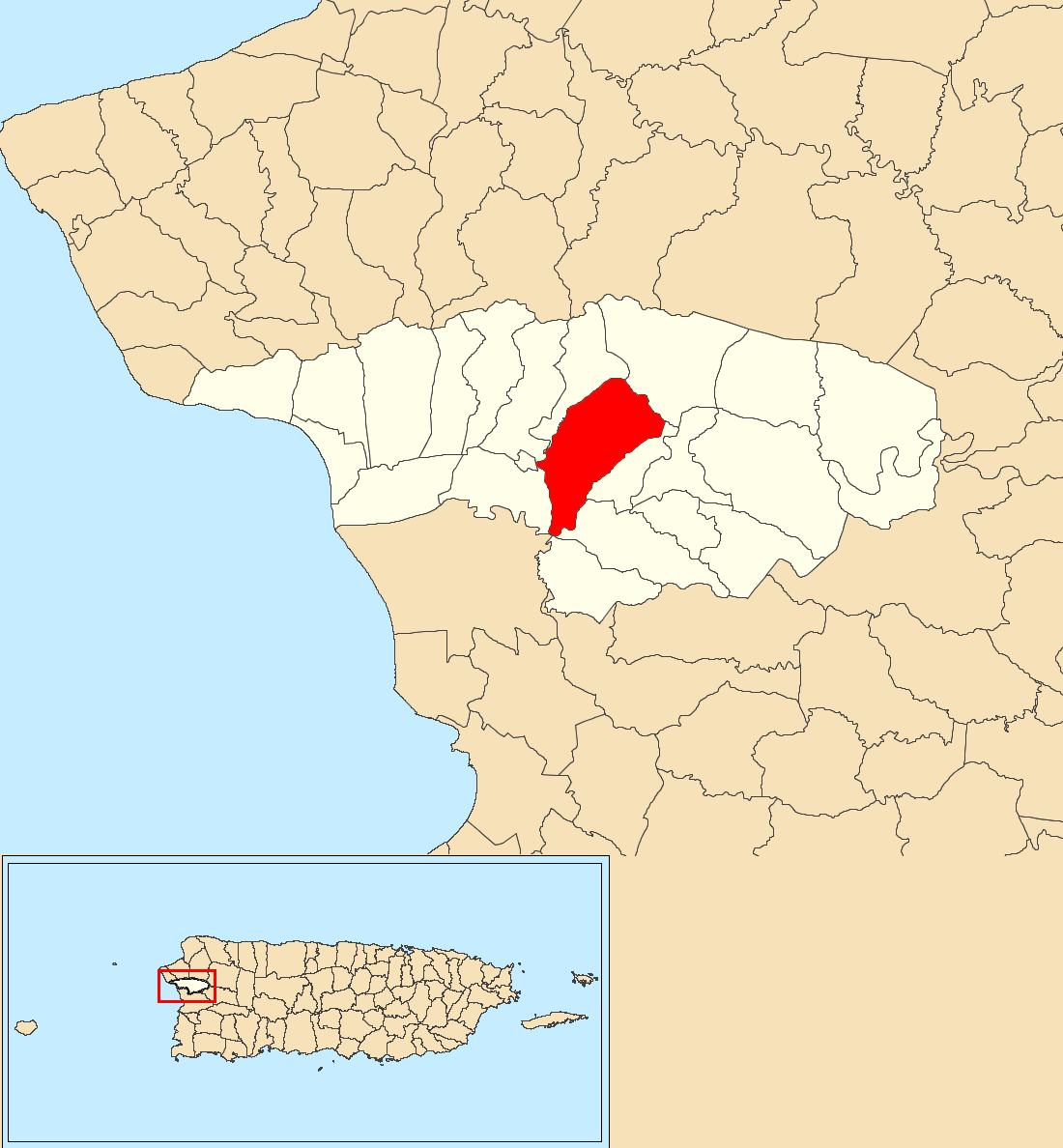
- Location of Carreras within the municipality of Añasco shown in red

- Location of Puerto Rico
- Coordinates: 18°17′15″N 67°07′30″W
- Commonwealth: Puerto Rico
- Municipality: Añasco

Area
  - Total: 2.52 sq mi (6.5 km^{2})
  - Land: 2.50 sq mi (6.5 km^{2})
  - Water: 0.02 sq mi (0.052 km^{2})
- Elevation: 72 ft (22 m)

Population (2010)
  - Total: 3,780
  - Density: 1,518.1/sq mi (586.1/km^{2})
- Source: 2010 Census
- Time zone: UTC−4 (AST)

Carreras is a barrio in the municipality of Añasco, Puerto Rico. Its population in 2010 was 3,780.

== History ==
Carreras was in Spain's gazetteers until Puerto Rico was ceded by Spain in the aftermath of the Spanish–American War under the terms of the Treaty of Paris of 1898 and became an unincorporated territory of the United States. In 1899, the United States Department of War conducted a census of Puerto Rico finding that the combined population of Carreras, Espino and Cidra barrios was 1,281.

Historical population
Census	Pop.	Note	%±
1910	677		—
1920	718		6.1%
1930	1,050		46.2%
1940	1,006		−4.2%
1950	963		−4.3%
1960	908		−5.7%
1970	0		−100.0%
1980	1,258		—
1990	2,010		59.8%
2000	3,303		64.3%
2010	3,780		14.4%
U.S. Decennial Census; 1900 (N/A) 1910-1930; 1930-1950 1980-2000 2010

== Sectors ==
Barrios (which are, in contemporary times, roughly comparable to minor civil divisions) in turn are further subdivided into smaller local populated place areas/units called sectores (sectors in English). The types of sectores may vary, from normally sector to urbanización to reparto to barriada to residencial, among others.

The following sectors are in Carreras barrio:

Edificio Paseo del Río.

== See also ==
- List of communities in Puerto Rico
- List of barrios and sectors of Añasco, Puerto Rico
