= Chiquito River (Yauco, Puerto Rico) =

River of Puerto Rico

Coordinates: 18.1171822°N 66.8768432°W

- Native name: Río Chiquito (Spanish)

Location
- Commonwealth: Puerto Rico
- Municipality: Yauco

Physical characteristics
- Source
  - location: Rubias, Yauco
- Mouth
  - location: Yauco River in Vegas, Yauco
  - elevation: 728 ft.

Basin features
- Waterfalls: Chorrera de Rubias

The Chiquito River (Spanish: Río Chiquito) is a tributary of the Yauco River that flows through the municipality of Yauco, Puerto Rico. Its headwaters lie in the Cordillera Central, in barrio Rubias of Yauco, close to the municipal boundary with Maricao. It meets the Yauco River close just north of Lake Luchetti.

== See also ==
- List of rivers of Puerto Rico
