= Francisco Rojas Tollinchi =

Puerto Rican writer (1911–1965)

- Born: May 30, 1911; Algarrobo, Yauco, Puerto Rico
- Died: February 12, 1965 (aged 53); Ponce, Puerto Rico
- Occupations: Poet; civic leader; journalist

Francisco Rojas Tollinchi (May 30, 1911 – February 12, 1965), was a Puerto Rican poet, civic leader and journalist.

== Early years ==
Rojas Tollinchi (birth name: Francisco Antonio Rojas Tollinchi) was one of five siblings born to Pedro Rojas Perez and Flora Maria Tollinchi Battistini in the barrio Algarrobos in Yauco, Puerto Rico. He had to abandon his secondary education at the age of 16, to help his family during his family's financial crisis. He later returned to school and completed his required studies and graduated from high school. In 1934, he married Elena Cummings and together had thirteen children. Rojas Tollinchi worked in various jobs before working for the Puerto Rico Aqueduct and Sewer Authority (AAA), a government agency which controls all the water storage and distribution functions in Puerto Rico. He was the President of the Ponce chapter of the Union of Employees of the AAA and vice-president of the general Union in the island.

== Poet ==
From 1962 to 1964, Rojas Tollinchi founded and was the managing director of "El Pozo," a monthly newspaper of the Union of Employees of the AAA. Lacking the financial means to publish his work, Rojas Tollinchi used different pen names to publish it in El Pozo. One of his readers, Antonio Rodríguez Menéndez, discovered Tollinchi's talent through El Pozo, and provided him with financial aid to publish his work in the "Ediciones Yaurinque".

Tollinchi's published works include Fronda Virgen (1940); Cien Sonetos en Cuatro Panfletos (One Hundred Sonnets in Four Pamphlets, 1944); Relicario Sonoro (Shrine of Sound, 1945); Sonetos de la Vida, el Amor y la Muerte (Sonnets of Life, Love and Death, 1955); and Silencio de Dios (Silence of God, 1956). Two of his poems in "Relicario Sonoro" were dedicated to the heroes of World War II from Yauco. The first Recuerdo Yaucano (Remembrance of a Yaucano) was a homage to Brigadier General Mihiel Gilormini, the Puerto Rican aviator and war hero. The second poem Al Sesenta y Cinco de Infantería (To the 65th Infantry Regiment) was dedicated to the all-Puerto Rican unit of the same name, whose members included many men from Yauco.

== Later years and legacy ==
Rojas Tollinchi was general manager of the newspaper La Nueva Reforma (The New Reform). He was also a civic leader and belonged to the League for Struggle for Negro Rights (LSNR). In 1957, he attended the First Congress of Puerto Rican Poets. He was also a collaborator in the publication of the Historical Alum of Yauco.

Rojas Tollinchi moved to Ponce in 1959, and lived there until his death in 1965. His hometown, Yauco, honored his memory by naming a street after him.

== See also ==
- List of Puerto Ricans
- Puerto Rican literature
- List of Puerto Rican writers
- Corsican immigration to Puerto Rico
