= Collores =

Collores may refer to:

- Collores, Humacao, Puerto Rico, a barrio in Puerto Rico
- Collores, Jayuya, Puerto Rico, a barrio in Puerto Rico
- Collores, Juana Díaz, Puerto Rico, a barrio in Puerto Rico
- Collores, Las Piedras, Puerto Rico, a barrio in Puerto Rico
- Collores, Orocovis, Puerto Rico, a barrio in Puerto Rico
- Collores, Yauco, Puerto Rico, a barrio in Puerto Rico
