= Algarrobo, Yauco, Puerto Rico =

Barrio of Puerto Rico

Algarrobo
- Barrio
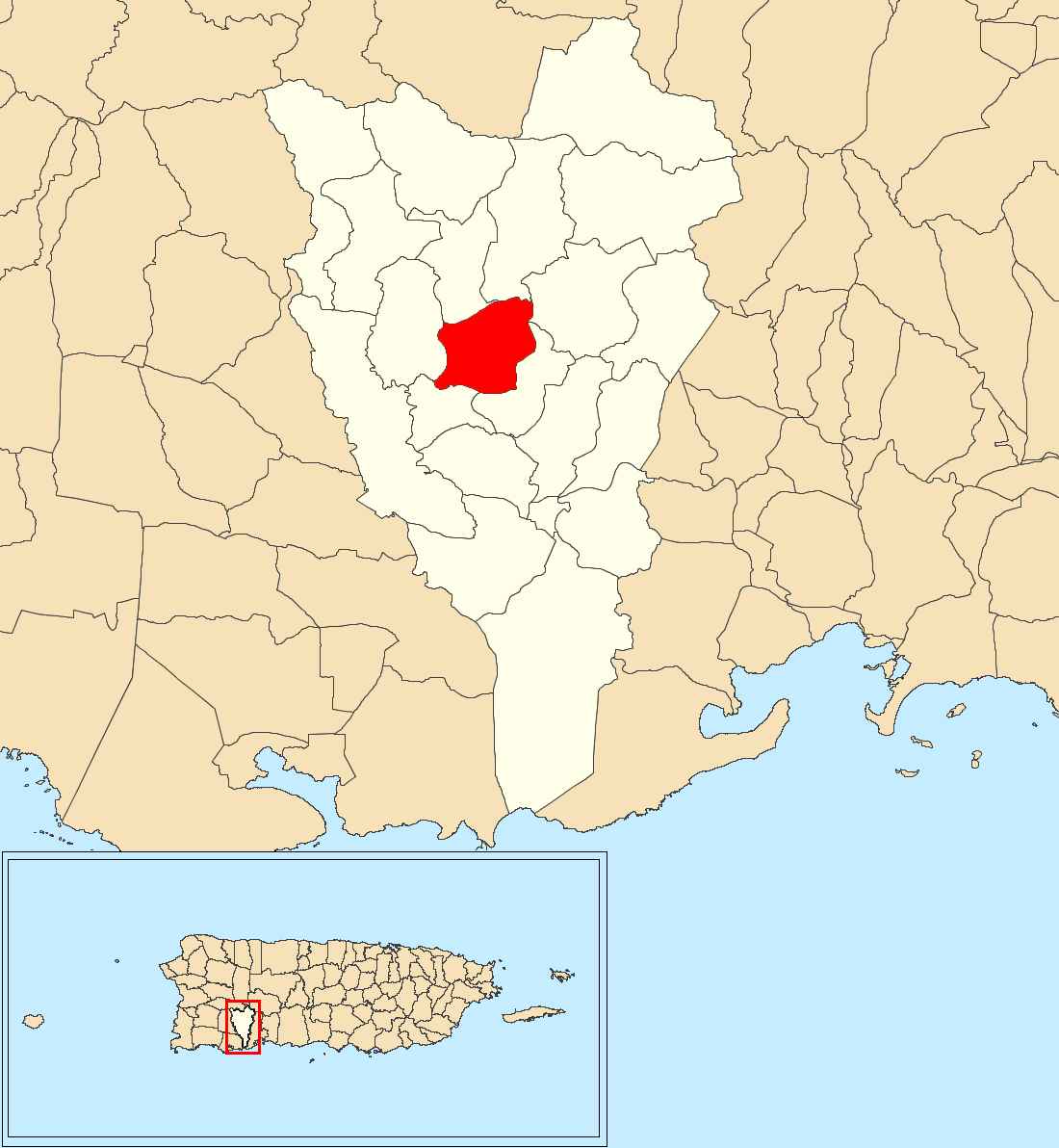
- Location of Algarrobo within the municipality of Yauco shown in red

- Location of Puerto Rico
- Coordinates: 18°05′01″N 66°52′01″W
- Commonwealth: Puerto Rico
- Municipality: Yauco

Area
  - Total: 2.25 sq mi (5.8 km^{2})
  - Land: 2.20 sq mi (5.7 km^{2})
  - Water: 0.05 sq mi (0.13 km^{2})
- Elevation: 515 ft (157 m)

Population (2010)
  - Total: 419
  - Density: 190.5/sq mi (73.6/km^{2})
- Source: 2010 Census
- Time zone: UTC−4 (AST)
- ZIP Code: 00698
- Area code: 787/939
- Website: www.yaucoatuservicio.com

Algarrobo is a barrio in the municipality of Yauco, Puerto Rico. Its population in 2010 was 419.

== History ==
Algarrobo was in Spain's gazetteers until Puerto Rico was ceded by Spain in the aftermath of the Spanish–American War under the terms of the Treaty of Paris of 1898 and became an unincorporated territory of the United States. In 1899, the United States Department of War conducted a census of Puerto Rico finding that the population of Algarrobo barrio was 952.

== Geography ==
Algarrobo barrio is located in central Yauco in the Cordillera Central. It is crossed by the Yauco River which flows from Lake Luchetti in the north towards downtown Yauco in the south.

== Demographics ==
Historical population
Census	Pop.	Note	%±
1900	952		—
1910	926		−2.7%
1920	955		3.1%
1930	938		−1.8%
1940	888		−5.3%
1950	1,099		23.8%
1960	983		−10.6%
1970	809		−17.7%
1980	657		−18.8%
1990	567		−13.7%
2000	483		−14.8%
2010	419		−13.3%
U.S. Decennial Census; 1899 (shown as 1900) 1910-1930; 1930-1950 1980-2000 2010

== See also ==
- List of communities in Puerto Rico
