= Caimito, Yauco, Puerto Rico =

Barrio of Puerto Rico

Caimito
- Barrio
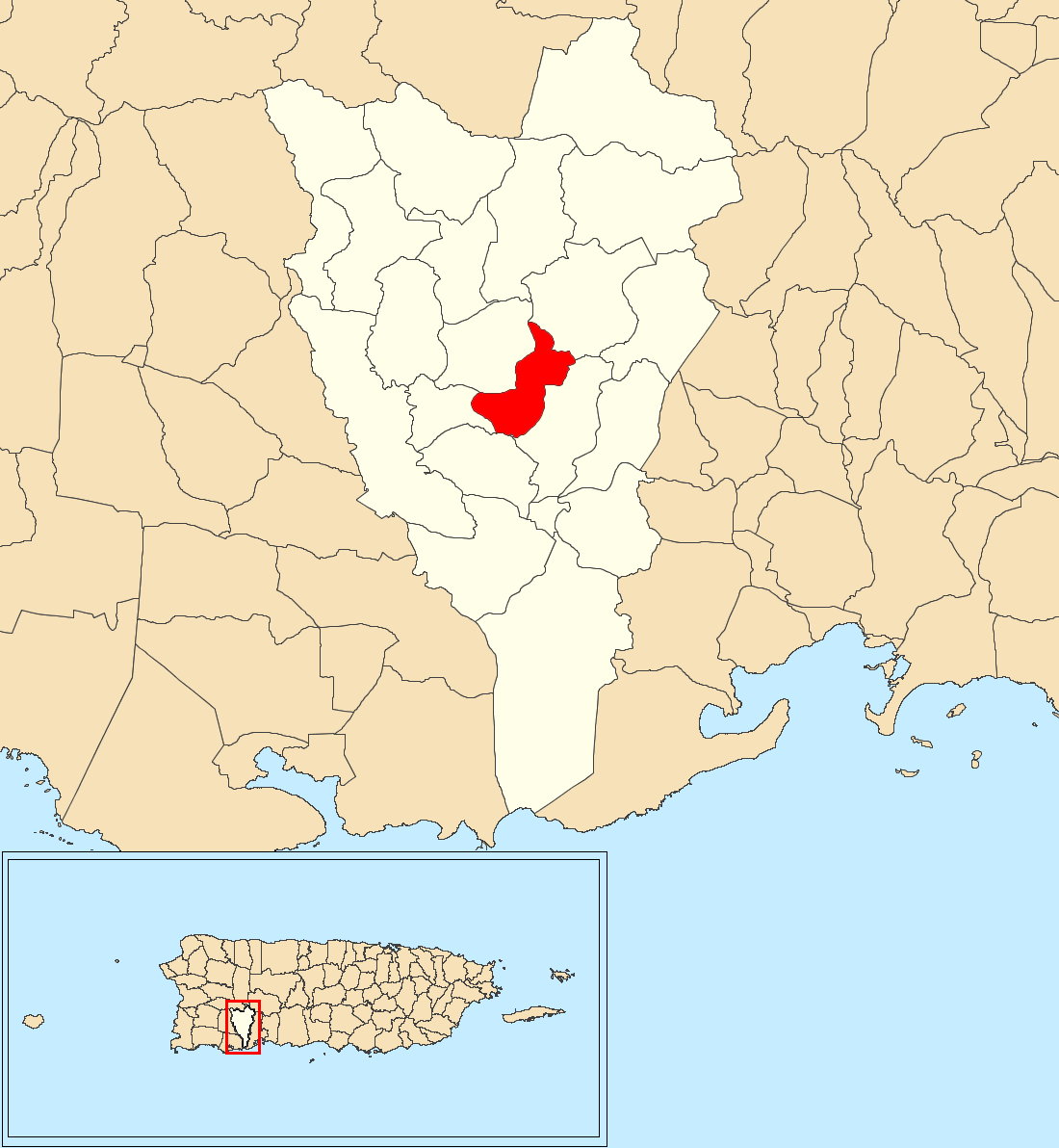
- Location of Caimito within the municipality of Yauco shown in red

- Location of Puerto Rico
- Coordinates: 18°04′10″N 66°51′15″W
- Commonwealth: Puerto Rico
- Municipality: Yauco

Area
  - Total: 1.57 sq mi (4.1 km^{2})
  - Land: 1.57 sq mi (4.1 km^{2})
  - Water: 0 sq mi (0 km^{2})
- Elevation: 427 ft (130 m)

Population (2010)
  - Total: 431
  - Density: 274.5/sq mi (106.0/km^{2})
- Source: 2010 Census
- Time zone: UTC−4 (AST)
- ZIP Code: 00698
- Area code: 787/939

Caimito is a barrio in the municipality of Yauco, Puerto Rico. Its population in 2010 was 431.

== History ==
Caimito was in Spain's gazetteers until Puerto Rico was ceded by Spain in the aftermath of the Spanish–American War under the terms of the Treaty of Paris of 1898 and became an unincorporated territory of the United States. In 1899, the United States Department of War conducted a census of Puerto Rico finding that the combined population of Caimito and Vegas barrios was 1,405.

Historical population
Census	Pop.	Note	%±
1910	626		—
1920	594		−5.1%
1930	494		−16.8%
1940	636		28.7%
1950	718		12.9%
1960	700		−2.5%
1970	755		7.9%
1980	739		−2.1%
1990	628		−15.0%
2000	647		3.0%
2010	431		−33.4%
U.S. Decennial Census; 1900 (N/A) 1910-1930; 1930-1950 1980-2000 2010

== See also ==
- List of communities in Puerto Rico
