= Quebradas, Yauco, Puerto Rico =

Barrio of Puerto Rico

Quebradas
- Barrio
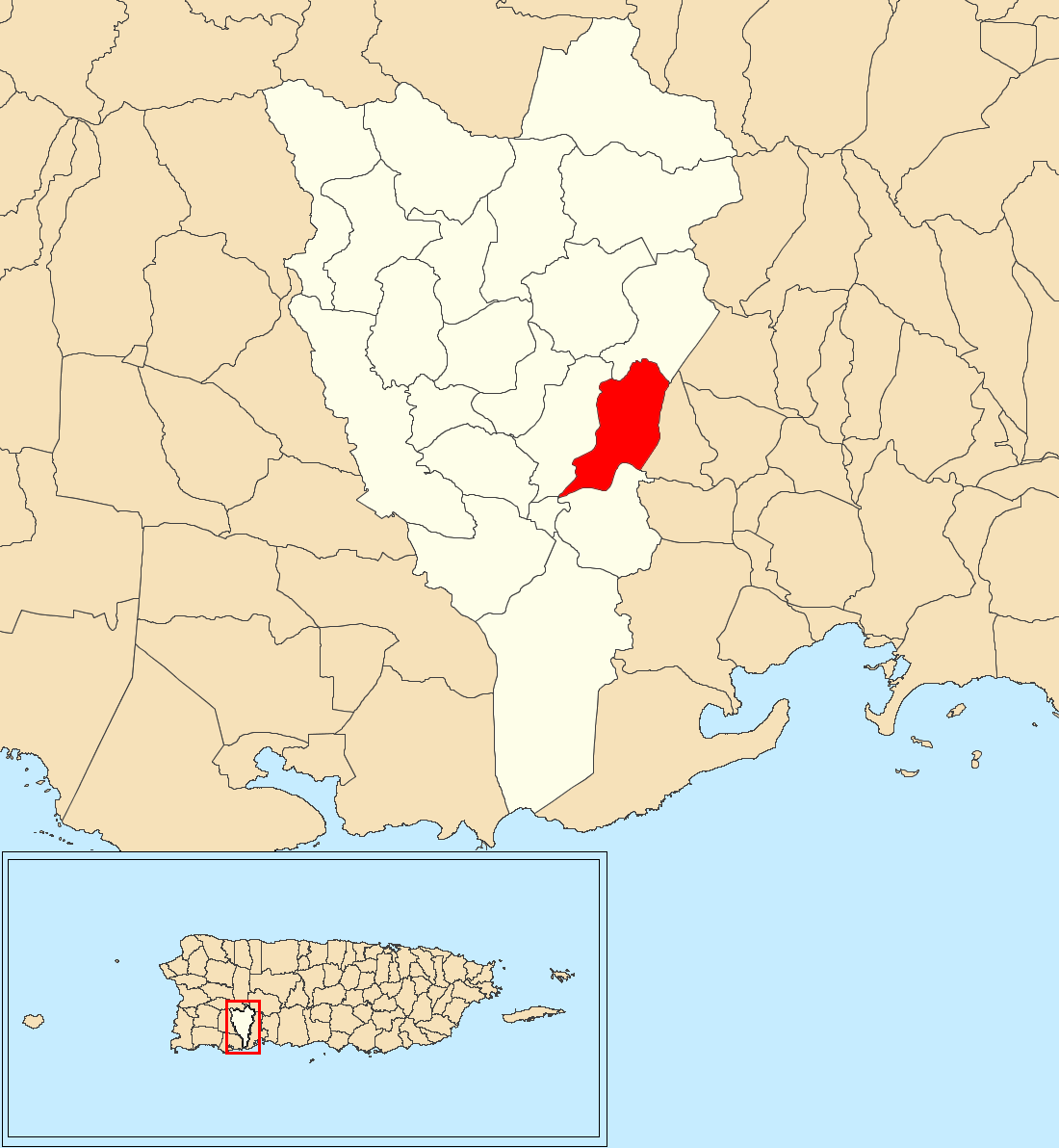
- Location of Quebradas within the municipality of Yauco shown in red

- Location of Puerto Rico
- Coordinates: 18°03′36″N 66°49′43″W
- Commonwealth: Puerto Rico
- Municipality: Yauco

Area
  - Total: 2.36 sq mi (6.1 km^{2})
  - Land: 2.36 sq mi (6.1 km^{2})
  - Water: 0 sq mi (0 km^{2})
- Elevation: 289 ft (88 m)

Population (2010)
  - Total: 883
  - Density: 374.2/sq mi (144.5/km^{2})
- Source: 2010 Census
- Time zone: UTC−4 (AST)
- ZIP Code: 00698
- Area code: 787/939

Quebradas is a barrio in the municipality of Yauco, Puerto Rico. Its population in 2010 was 883.

A quebrada literally means "ravine".

== History ==
Quebradas was in Spain's gazetteers until Puerto Rico was ceded by Spain in the aftermath of the Spanish–American War under the terms of the Treaty of Paris of 1898 and became an unincorporated territory of the United States. In 1899, the United States Department of War conducted a census of Puerto Rico finding that the population of Quebradas barrio was 1,009.

Historical population
Census	Pop.	Note	%±
1900	1,009		—
1910	984		−2.5%
1920	1,010		2.6%
1930	1,035		2.5%
1940	1,241		19.9%
1950	1,029		−17.1%
1960	895		−13.0%
1970	864		−3.5%
1980	710		−17.8%
1990	748		5.4%
2000	836		11.8%
2010	883		5.6%
U.S. Decennial Census; 1899 (shown as 1900) 1910-1930; 1930-1950 1980-2000 2010

== See also ==
- List of communities in Puerto Rico
