= Yauco, Puerto Rico =

Town and municipality in Puerto Rico

Yauco Municipio Autónomo de Yauco
- Municipality
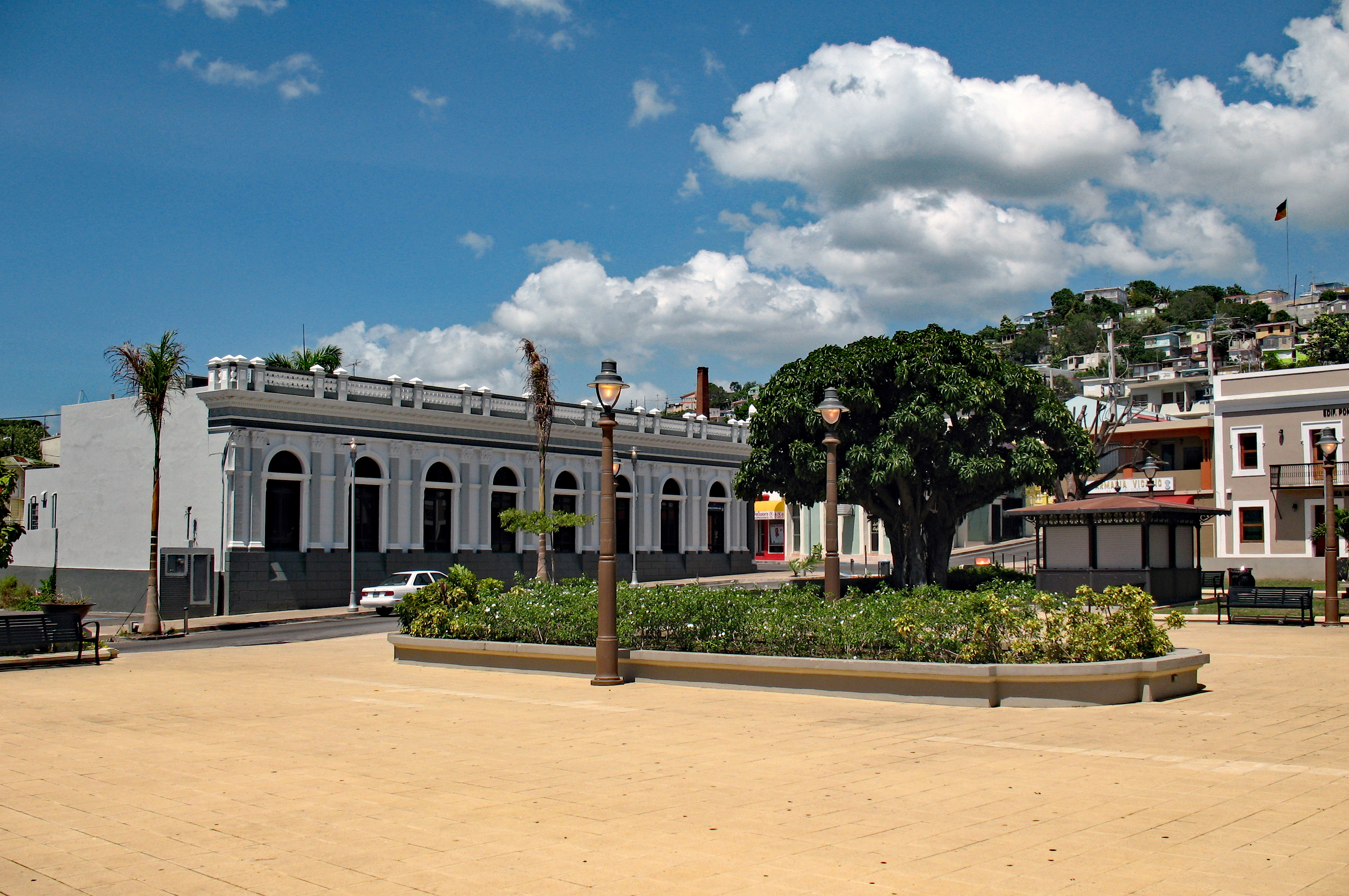
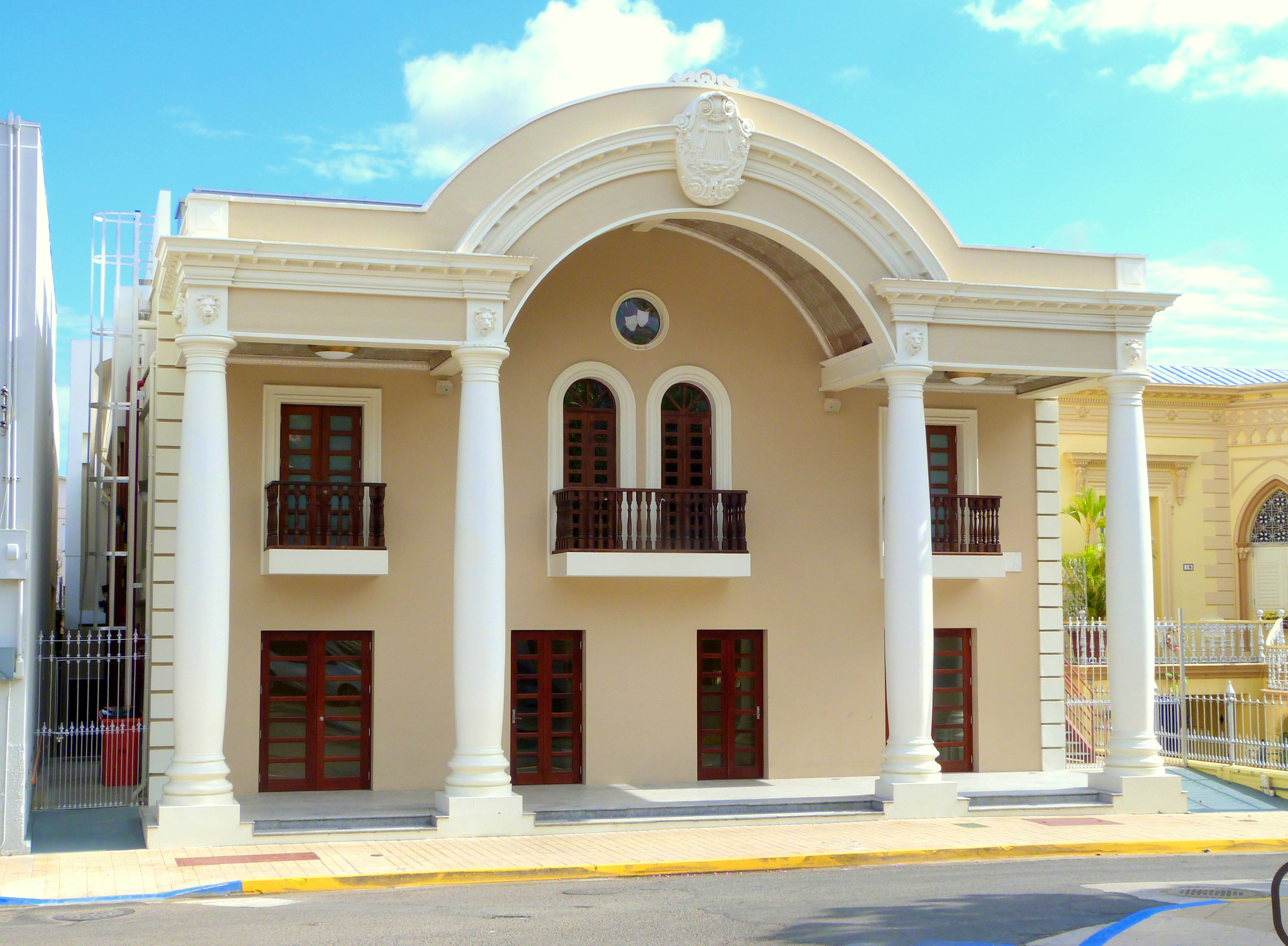
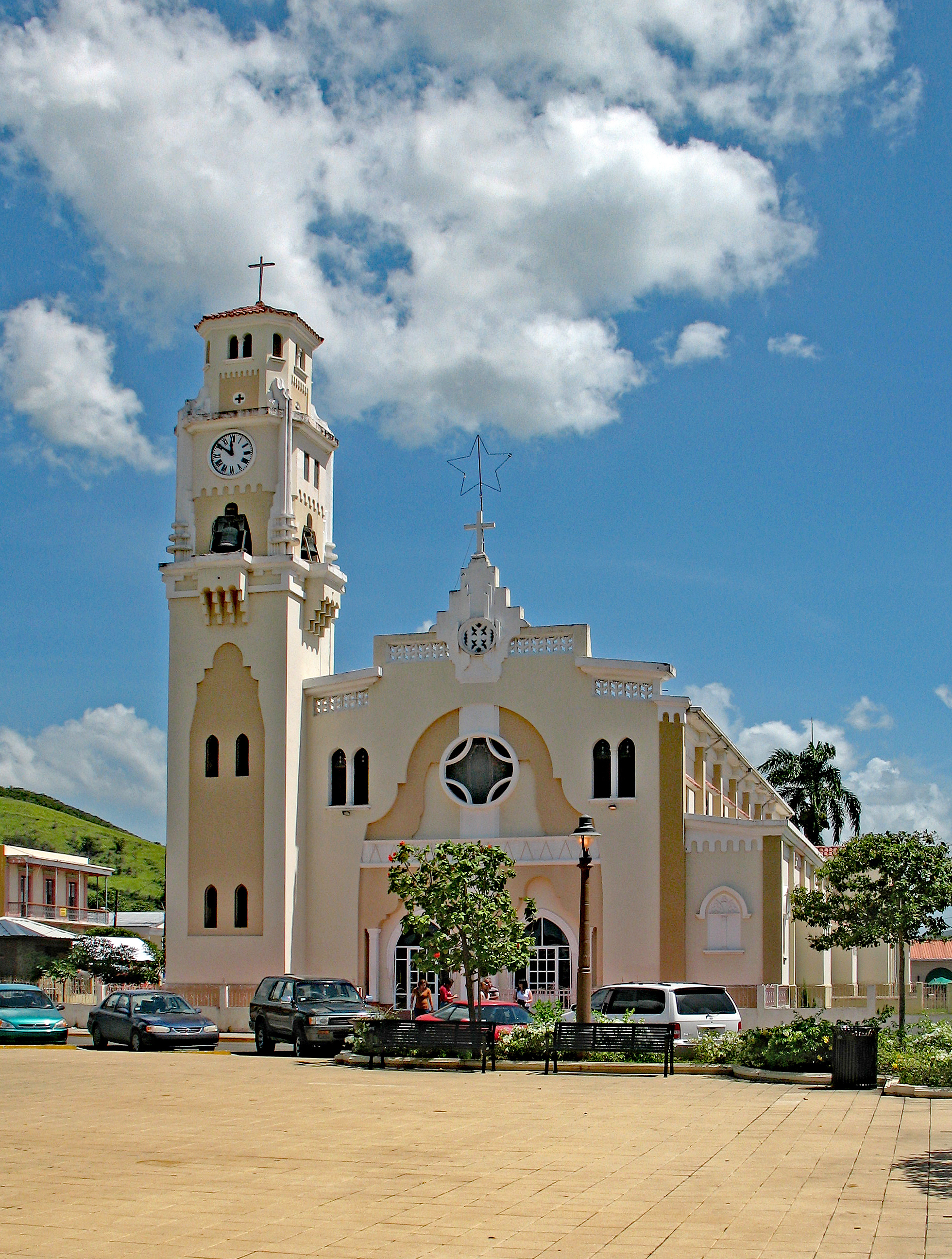
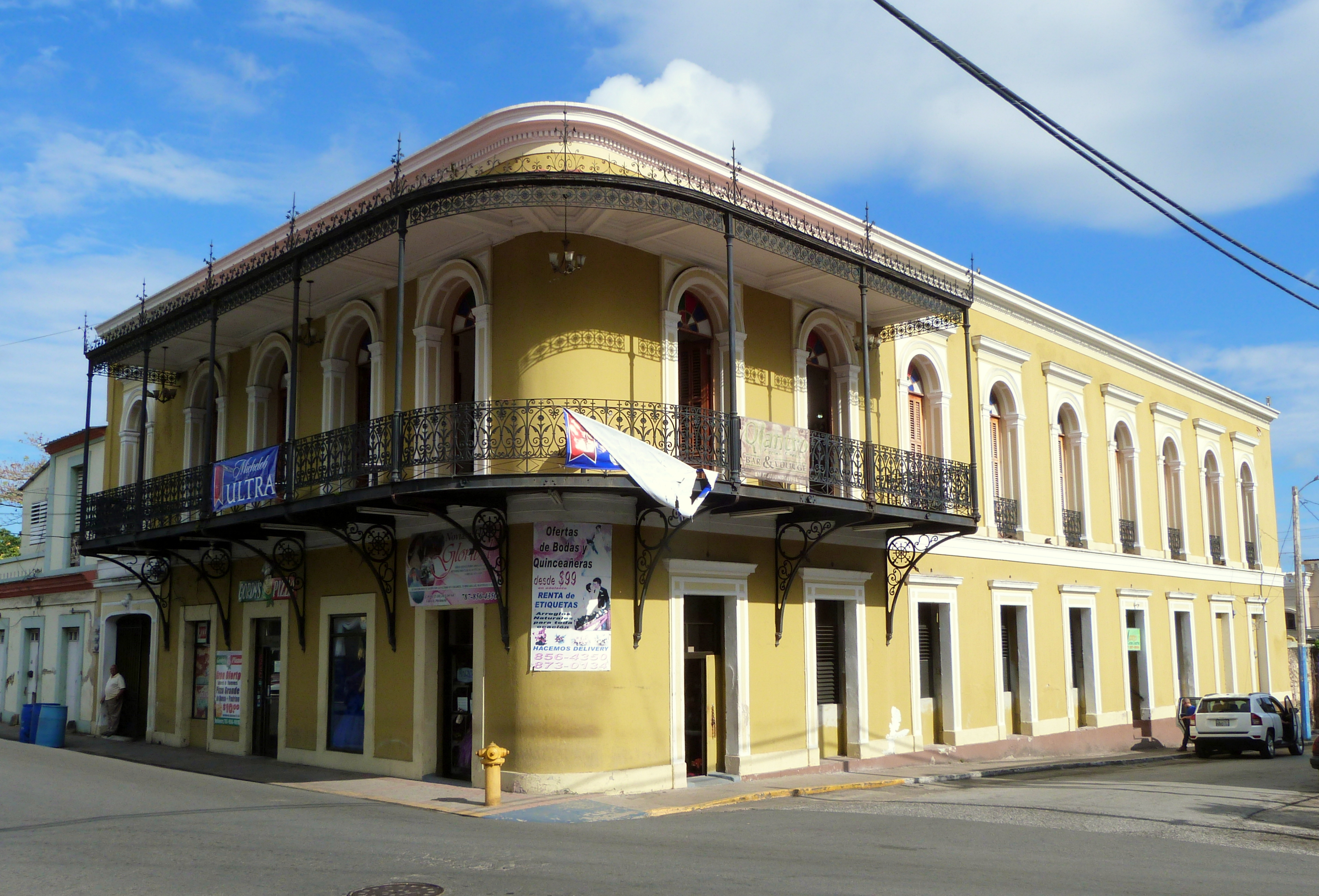
- From top, left to right: Fernando Pacheco Square; Teatro Ideal; Nuestra Señora del Rosario Church; and Casona Césari in Yauco Pueblo

- Flag Coat of arms
- Nicknames: El Pueblo del Café (The Coffee Town), Capital Taína (Taíno Capital), Los Corsos (The Corsicans)
- Anthem: "Pueblo de gestas gloriosas"
- Map of Puerto Rico highlighting Yauco Municipality
- Coordinates: 18°2′13″N 66°51′1″W
- Sovereign state: United States
- Commonwealth: Puerto Rico
- Founded: 29 February 1756
- Barrios: 21 barrios: Aguas Blancas; Algarrobo; Almácigo Alto; Almácigo Bajo; Barina; Caimito; Collores; Diego Hernández; Duey; Frailes; Jácana; Naranjo; Quebradas; Ranchera; Río Prieto; Rubias; Sierra Alta; Susúa Alta; Susúa Baja; Vegas; Yauco barrio-pueblo

Government
  - Mayor: Angel Luis "Luigi" Torres Ortíz (PNP)
  - Senatorial dist.: 5 – Ponce
  - Representative dist.: 21,23

Area
  - Municipality: 68.8 sq mi (178.1 km^{2})
  - Land: 68.1 sq mi (176.5 km^{2})
  - Water: 0.62 sq mi (1.6 km^{2})

Population (2020)
  - Municipality: 34,172
  - Estimate (2025): 31,608 ▼
  - Rank: 36th in Puerto Rico
  - Density: 501.4/sq mi (193.6/km^{2})
  - Metro: 86,142
- Demonym: Yaucanos
- Time zone: UTC-4 (AST)
- ZIP Code: 00698
- Area code: 787/939

Yauco (Spanish pronunciation: [ˈʝawko]) is a town and municipality in southern Puerto Rico. Although the downtown is inland, the municipality stretches to a southern coast facing the Caribbean Sea. Yauco is located south of Maricao, Lares and Adjuntas; east of Sabana Grande and Guánica; and west of Guayanilla. The municipality consists of 20 barrios and Yauco Pueblo (the downtown and administrative center of the municipality). It is both a principal town of the Yauco Metropolitan Statistical Area and the Ponce-Yauco-Coamo Combined Statistical Area.

It was founded by Fernando Pacheco on 29 February 1756, and developed for commodity crops of tobacco, sugar cane, and coffee. Yauco became a center for Corsican immigration to Puerto Rico in the 19th century due to its geographical similarity to their homeland. Corsicans have contributed to many areas of life in Yauco, particularly to its coffee industry. This has played a role in the town's nicknames of El Pueblo del Café (Town of Coffee), and residents of the municipality are often referred to as Los Corsos (The Corsicans).

== Etymology and nicknames ==
Yauco was named after the Yauco River, which itself comes from the Taíno word coayuco, meaning "cassava plantation" (also where the word yucca comes from). The city has numerous nicknames such as Pueblo del Café ("coffee town"), due to the high number of coffee plantations in the area, and Pueblo de los Corsos ("Town of Corsicans"), after the large number of Corsican immigrants who settled in the town and who were later influential to the area's coffee industry. It is also popularly known as La Capital Taína ("the Taíno capital") after the native peoples of Puerto Rico who also lived in the area.

== History ==
The Taino natives considered the area of Yauco the capital of Boriken and was governed by Agüeybana, the most powerful Taíno cacique (chief) in the island. All the other caciques were subject to and had to obey Agüeybaná, although they governed their own tribes. Upon Agüeybaná's death in 1510, his nephew, Agüeybaná II), became the most powerful cacique in the island. Agüeybaná II doubted the "godly" status the Spaniards were rumored to have. He came up with a plan to test these doubts: he and Urayoán (cacique of Añasco) sent some of their tribe members to lure a Spaniard named Diego Salcedo into a river and drown him. They watched over Salcedo's body to ensure that he did not resuscitate. Salcedo's death convinced Agüeybaná II and the rest of the Taíno that the Spaniards were not gods. They rebelled against the Spanish in 1511 but were defeated.

In 1755, the Spanish settlers of the region built a small chapel and named it Nuestra Señora del Santísimo Rosario (Our Lady of the Holy Rosary). The settlers sent Fernando Pacheco as their representative to the Spanish Government, to request the establishment of a municipality, since they had satisfied one of the requirements for the establishment of a municipality, namely, to establish a place of worship. On 29 February 1756, the King of Spain granted the settlers their request and the town of Yauco was founded. Fernando Pacheco was named Lieutenant of War of the new town.

From the mid-19th to the early 20th century, hundreds of Corsican, Italian, French, Portuguese, Irish, Scots, and German immigrants arrived in Puerto Rico, attracted by the Spanish Crown's offer of free land to Catholic white European settlers. They settled mostly in the south-central region.

=== 19th century Corsican immigration ===
The island of Puerto Rico is somewhat similar in geography to the island of Corsica and appealed to many Corsican immigrants. Corsica was part of the Republic of Genoa for centuries until 1768.

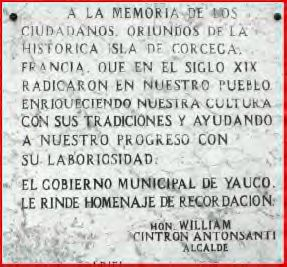
Memorial dedicated to the Corsicans in Yauco

Corsicans descend from a combination of ancient Corsi people from northeastern Sardinia and people who came over later from northern and central Italy (including Tuscans, Etruscans, Ligurians, and Romans) along with, to a lesser extent, Greeks and Carthaginians. Corsica has been part of France since 1768 but retains a distinct Italian culture. It was ruled by the Republic of Genoa from 1284 to 1755, when it became a self-proclaimed independent Italian-speaking Republic. In 1768, Genoa officially ceded its out of control colony to Louis XV of France as part of a pledge for debts, and in 1769 France forcibly annexed it.

Hundreds of Corsicans and their families immigrated to Puerto Rico from as early as 1830, and their numbers peaked in the 1850s, after European unrest following the Revolutions of 1848, and environmental problems of lengthy drought. The Corsicans tended to settle in the mountainous southwestern region of the island, and Yauco attracted the majority of them. As noted, the three main crops were coffee, sugar cane and tobacco. The new settlers first worked on the farms, and some saved money in order to own and operate their own grocery stores. They began to specialize in cultivation of coffee as a commodity crop.

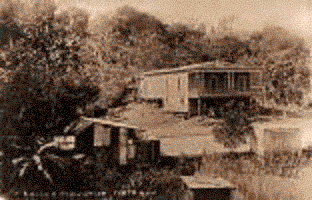
Early Yauco coffee plantation (Pre-1920)

Coffee was first cultivated in the Rancheras and Diego Hernández sectors; it was expanded to the Aguas Blancas, Frailes and Rubias sectors. The Mariani family adapted a cotton gin in the 1860s to use in mechanical de-husking of coffee. This improved the appearance of Puerto Rico's coffee beans and helped it stand out in the international coffee market. By the 1860s the Corsican settlers were the leaders of the coffee industry in Puerto Rico, and seven out of ten coffee plantations were owned by Corsicans.

=== Intentona de Yauco ===
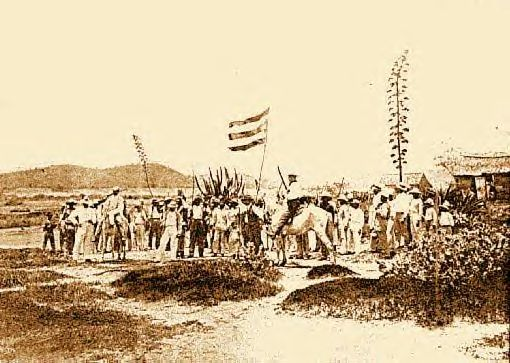
Flag flown by Fidel Vélez and his men during the "Intentona de Yauco" revolt

The pro-independence movement raised the second and last major revolt here against Spanish colonial rule in Puerto Rico, known as the Intentona de Yauco (the attempted Coup of Yauco). The revolt, which occurred on 26 March 1897, was organized by Antonio Mattei Lluberas, Mateo Mercado and Fidel Vélez. They were supported by leaders of El Grito de Lares, the first major independence attempt, who were in exile in New York City as members of the Puerto Rican Revolutionary Committee. During this uprising, Vélez raised for the first time what became the current flag of Puerto Rico on local soil. Local Spanish authorities had heard rumors of the revolt and acted swiftly to suppress it.

=== Spanish–American War ===
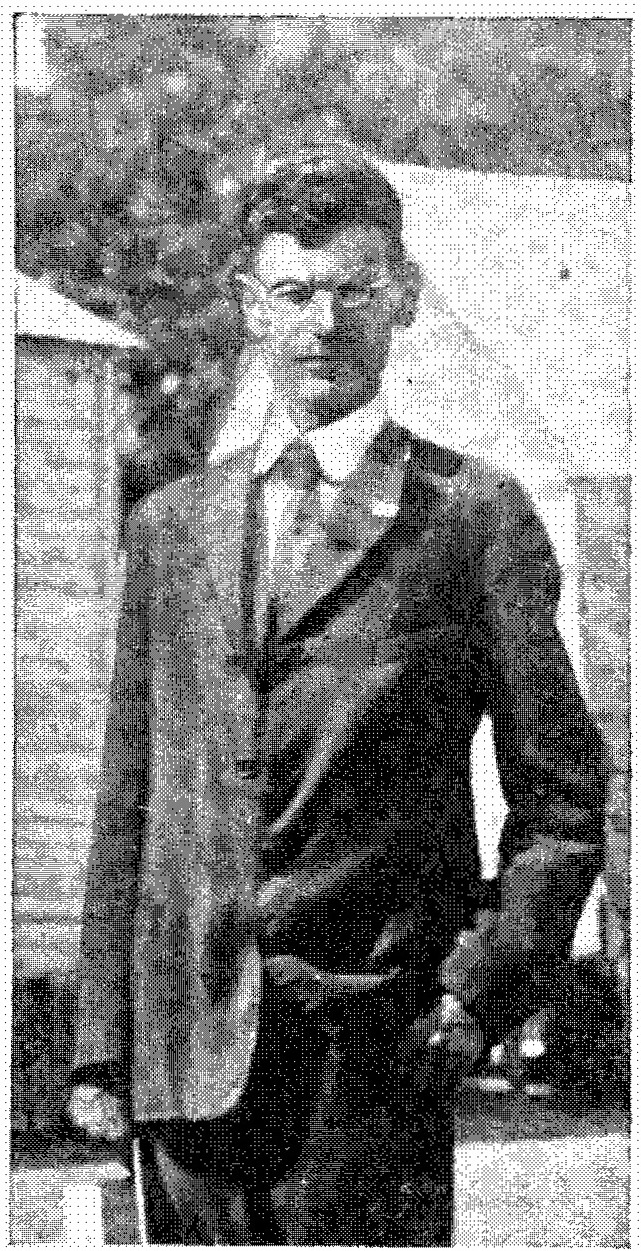
Juan María Morciglio was one of the men who stayed.

In 1898, upon the outbreak of the Spanish–American War, Guánica was a small barrio within the municipality of Yauco. It had 60 houses in all and was defended only by eleven members of the 4th Volante de Yauco, a Puerto Rican militia unit, under the command of Lieutenant Enrique Méndez López. When the convoy with General Nelson A. Miles, approached the barrio, Guánica lighthouse keeper Robustiano Rivera immediately alerted its residents. Nearly all the residents abandoned their homes and joined Rivera to go to Yauco, where he broke the news of the invading forces to the town's mayor. Only Agustín Barrenechea, Vicente Ferrer, Juan María Morciglio, Simón Mejil, Salvador Muñoz, Cornelio Serrano and Pascual Elena stayed to welcome the invaders.

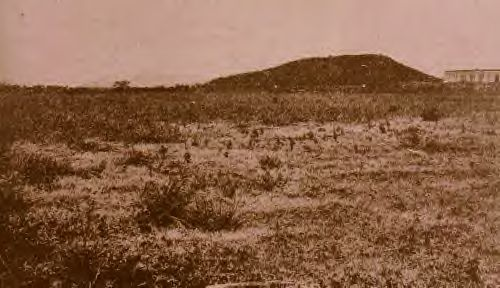
Part of the Hacienda Desideria, owned by Antonio Mariani, where the Battle of Yauco took place in 1898

The first skirmish between Spanish/Puerto Rican and American armed forces was fought in that barrio between the Puerto Rican militia and twenty-eight sailors and Marines, under the command of Lieutenants H. P. Huse and Wood. They had come from the USS Gloucester on rafts and landed on the beach, where Lt. Méndez López and his men opened fire on the Americans. During the small battle which followed, the Americans returned fire with a machine gun and the Gloucester began to bombard the Spanish position. Lt. Méndez López and three of his men were wounded, and the militia unit retreated to the town of Yauco.

This was also the site of the first major land battle in Puerto Rico during the war between Spanish/Puerto Rican and American armed forces. On 26 July 1898, Spanish forces and Puerto Rican volunteers, led by Captain Salvador Meca and Lieutenant Colonel Francisco Puig, fought against American forces led by Brigadier General George A. Garretson. The Spanish forces engaged the 6th Massachusetts in a firefight at the Hacienda Desideria, owned by Antonio Mariani, in what became known as the Battle of Yauco of the Puerto Rico Campaign. The casualties of Puig's forces were two officers and three soldiers wounded and two soldiers dead. The Spanish forces were ordered to retreat.

=== Hurricane Maria ===
Significant rainfall from Hurricane Maria, on 20 September 2017, triggered numerous landslides in Yauco, leaving entire communities cut-off. The Yauco River caused flooding that decimated entire neighborhoods.

=== Earthquakes in 2019 and 2020 ===
Multiple residences and structures in Yauco were damaged in a series of earthquakes with increasing magnitude that started on 28 December 2019 and culminated with a 6.4-magnitude earthquake that struck the island in the morning hours of 7 January 2020. More than thirty-two residences collapsed and hundreds were structurally unsound after the earthquake struck near Yauco. To aid residents who were left without power or homeless, the National Guard was mobilized. A center for emergency operations was set up in the municipality's auditorium parking area, with air-conditioned tarps and tents for evacuated hospital patients and with food being cooked by World Central Kitchen.

== Geography ==
Yauco is a mountainous municipality located in the Cordillera Central and bisected by the Yauco River. Other rivers in the municipality are the Chiquito, Duey, Loco and Naranjo Rivers. Notable mountains in the area include Mount Membrillo, the highest named summit in the municipality and 9th highest peak in the island at 3,579 feet (1,090 m) of elevation, the Rodadero Peak and Cerro Curret.

=== Barrios ===
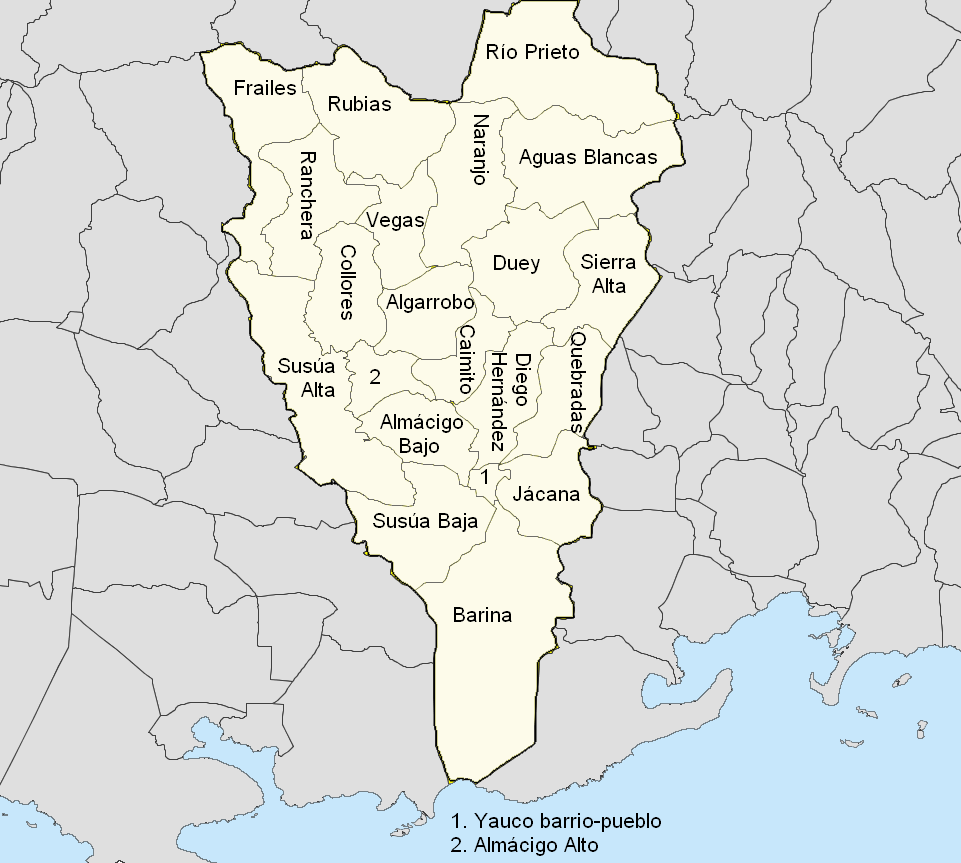
Barrios of Yauco, Puerto Rico

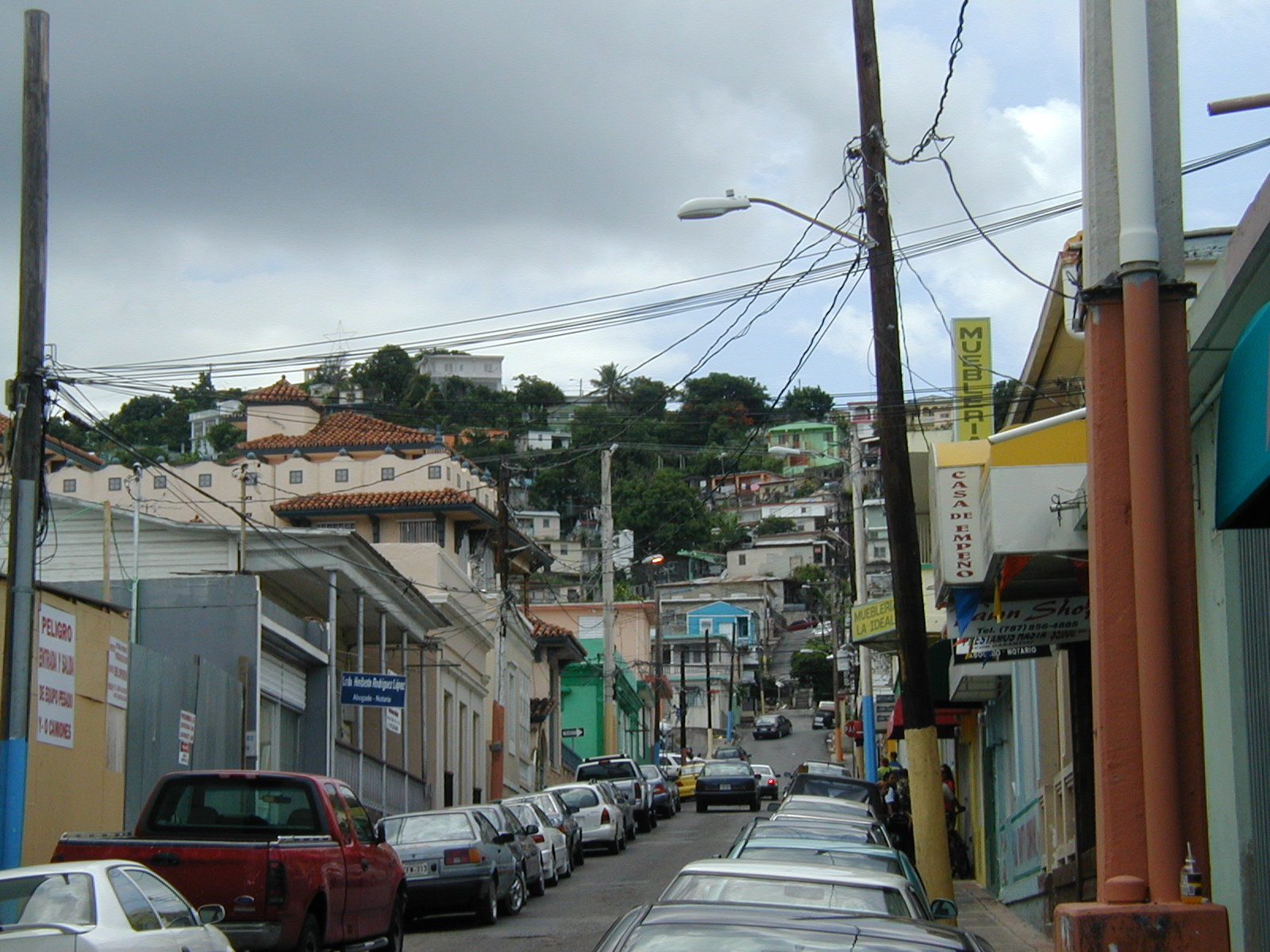
Pueblo of Yauco

Like all municipalities of Puerto Rico, Yauco is subdivided into barrios. The municipal buildings, central square and large Catholic church are located in a barrio referred to as "el pueblo".

1. Aguas Blancas
2. Algarrobo
3. Almácigo Alto
4. Almácigo Bajo
5. Barina
6. Caimito
7. Collores
8. Diego Hernández
9. Duey
10. Frailes
11. Jácana
12. Naranjo
13. Quebradas
14. Ranchera
15. Río Prieto
16. Rubias
17. Sierra Alta
18. Susúa Alta
19. Susúa Baja
20. Vegas
21. Yauco barrio-pueblo

=== Sectors ===
Barrios (which are like minor civil divisions) and subbarrios, are further subdivided into smaller areas called sectores (sectors in English). The types of sectores may vary, from normally sector to urbanización to reparto to barriada to residencial, among others.

=== Special Communities ===
Comunidades Especiales de Puerto Rico (Special Communities of Puerto Rico) are marginalized communities whose citizens are experiencing a certain amount of social exclusion. A map shows these communities occur in nearly every municipality of the commonwealth. Of the 742 places that were on the list in 2014, the following barrios, communities, sectors, or neighborhoods were in Yauco: Diego Hernández, Frailes, Ranchera, Sector Primitivo Irizarry in Quebradas, El Pozo, Sector Cantera, Pueblo Norte (El Cerro), and Río Prieto.

== Demographics ==
Historical population
Census	Pop.	Note	%±
1900	27,119		—
1910	31,504		16.2%
1920	25,848		−18.0%
1930	27,787		7.5%
1940	30,533		9.9%
1950	33,708		10.4%
1960	34,780		3.2%
1970	35,103		0.9%
1980	37,742		7.5%
1990	42,058		11.4%
2000	46,384		10.3%
2010	42,043		−9.4%
2020	34,172		−18.7%
2025 (est.)	31,608	▼	−7.5%
U.S. Decennial Census; 1899 (shown as 1900) 1910–1930; 1930-1950 1960–2000 2010 2020

According to the United States Census Bureau the population of Yauco in the year 2000 was 46,384 persons, decreasing to 42,043 persons in 2010, a net loss of 4,341 people or 9.36% of its population. The urban zone accounted for 17,186 of its inhabitants in the 2010 census. The 2020 census indicated the population was 34,172 a decline of 18.7% from the 2010 census.

== Tourism ==
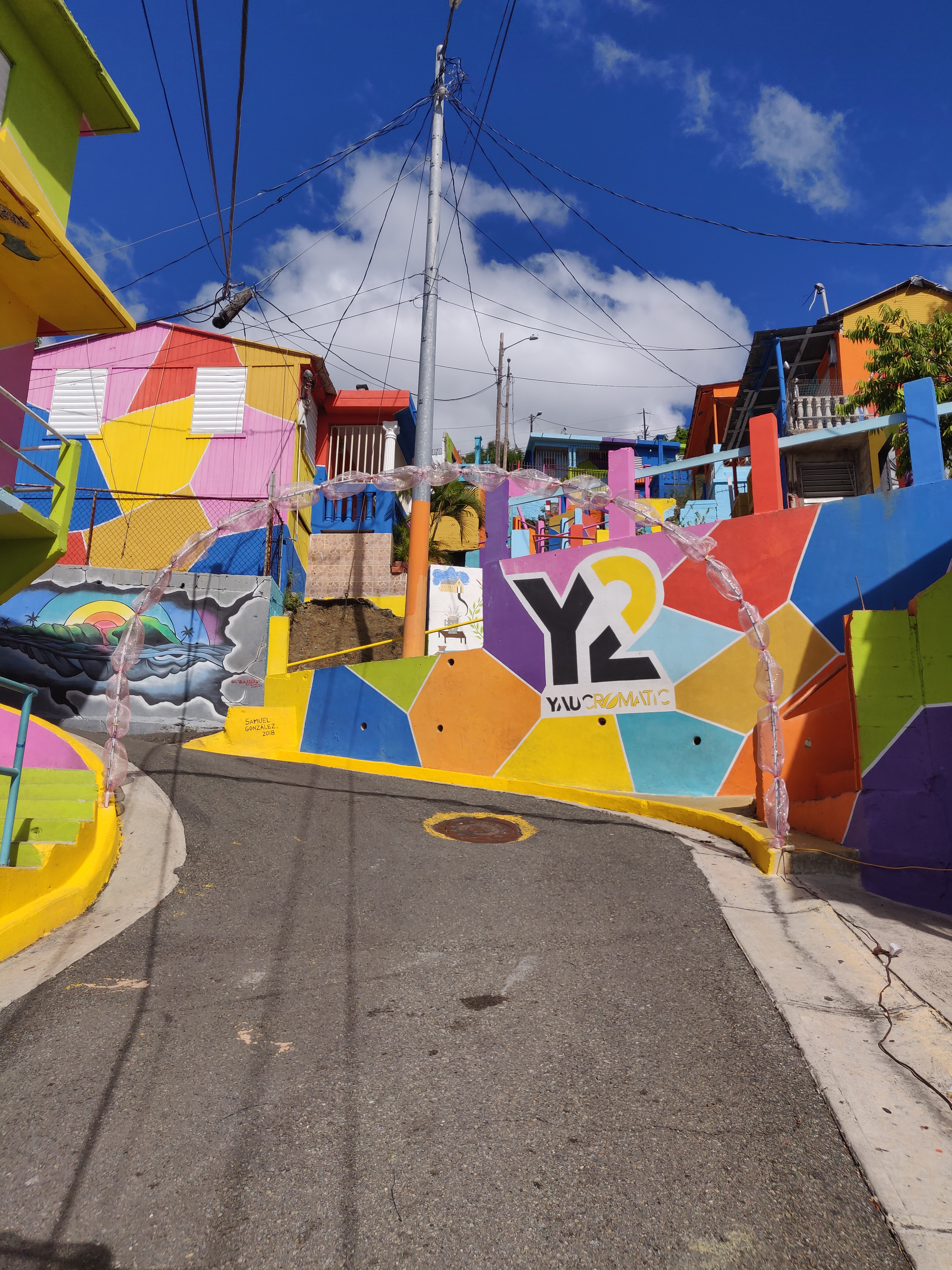
"Yaucromatic" in Cerro de Yauco in Yauco barrio-pueblo

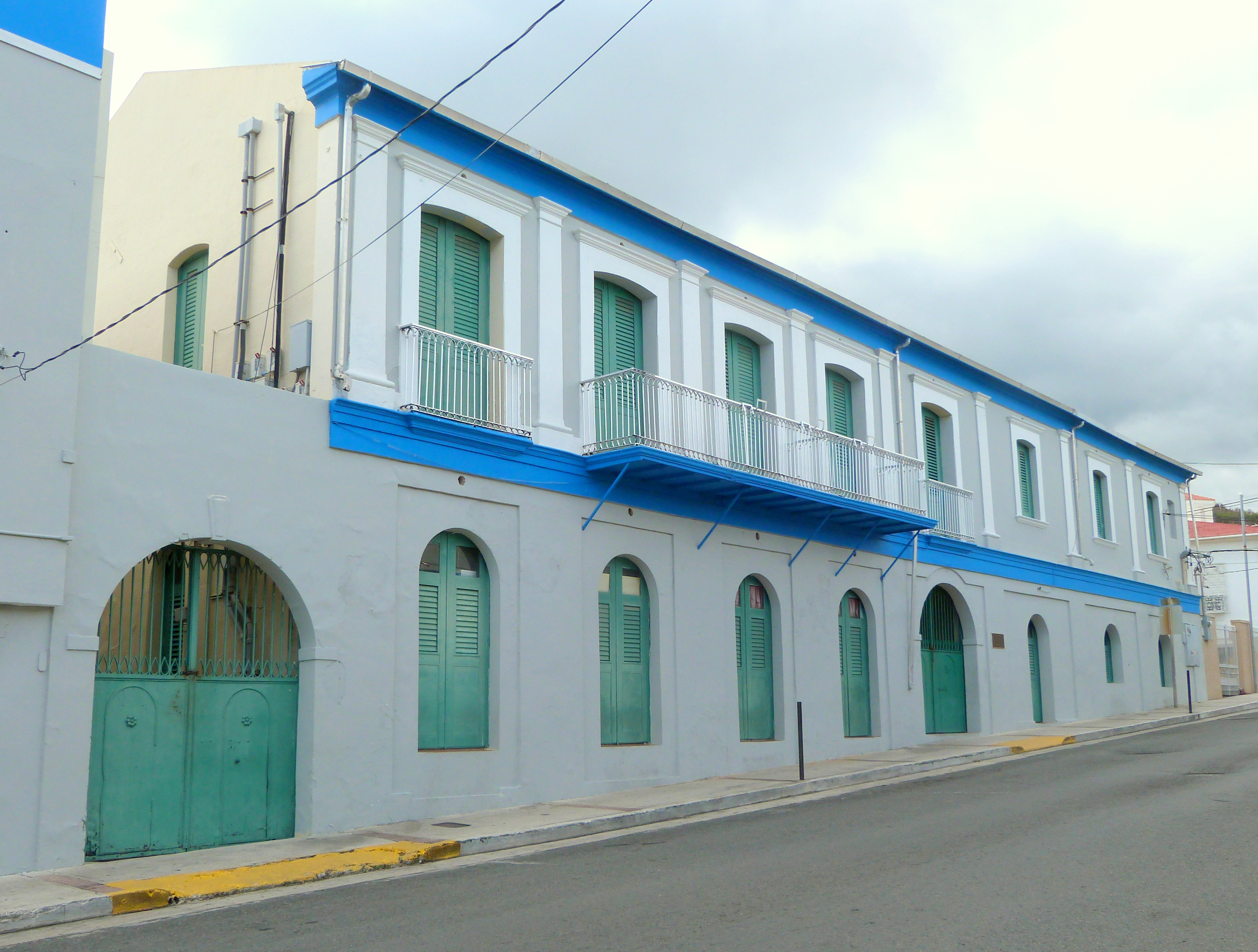
Casa Agostini in Yauco

Following Hurricane Maria, in order to lift up their spirits, Yauco's artists worked on "Yaucromatic", a project to paint colorful murals in Cerro de Yauco in Yauco barrio-pueblo.

=== Landmarks and places of interest ===
There are 2 beaches in Yauco, including Playa Ballenas. Some of the places of interest in Yauco include:

At Yauco Pueblo (the historic downtown):

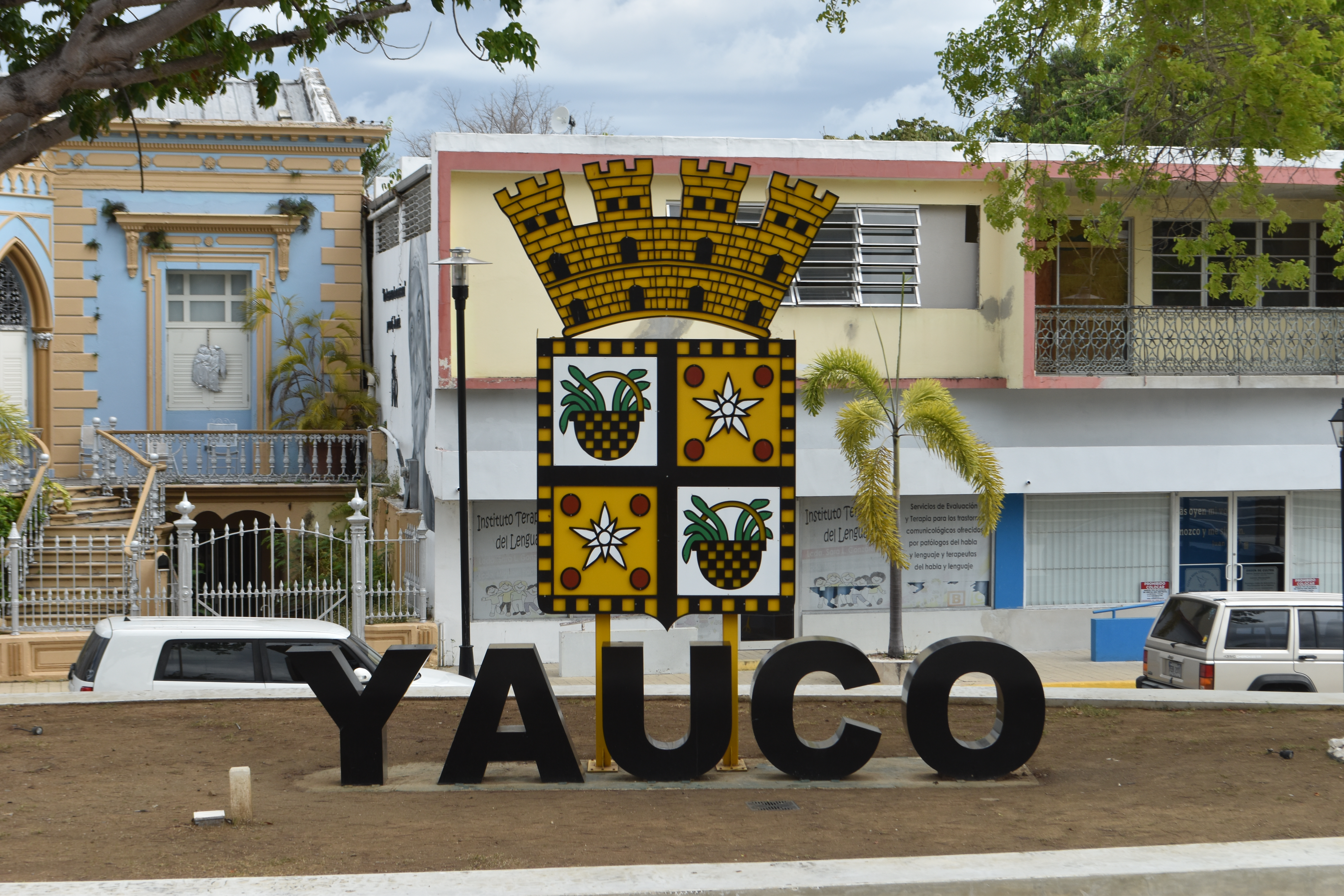
Coat of arms monument and Yauco sign in Yauco, Yauco, Puerto Rico

- Cesari House, historic house from 1893.
- Chalet Amill, Beaux Arts-style house from 1914.
- Cuesta Los Judios (Spanish for "ascent of the Jews"), next to Reparto La Esperanza it has a length of 0.21 kilometres.
- Filardi House, Beaux Arts-style house from 1916.
- Franceschi Antongiorgi House, Beaux Arts-style house from 1907.
- González Vivaldi House, Criollo-style house from 1880.
- Logia Masónica Hijos de la Luz, the historic masonic lodge from 1894.
- Negroni Mansion, also known as the Agostini House, a Classical Revival-style house designed by Miguel Briganti Pinti.
- Nuestra Señora del Rosario Church and City Hall at Plaza Fernando Pacheco.
- Nuestra Señora del Rosario Hermitage Ruins, just outside the city center, today a museum and ruins.
- Santísimo Rosario School, a school located in a historic building.
- Teatro Ideal, a historic theater which was inaugurated on 24 April 1920.
- Yaucromatic painted houses and murals.

Elsewhere in Yauco:

- Apiturismo honey production farm dedicated to agritourism.
- Atolladora Beach, shared with Guayanilla.
- Guilarte State Forest, shared with Adjuntas, Guayanilla and Peñuelas.
- Hacienda Mireia, also known as Hacienda La Juanita, a historic plantation, is a 50-acre coffee farm.
- Lake Lucchetti, a reservoir and wildlife refuge named after engineer Antonio S. Lucchetti.
- Mario "Ñato" Ramírez Torres Municipal Stadium
- Mount Membrillo, the highest mountain in the municipality and 9th tallest in Puerto Rico.
- Pico Rodadero, the second highest mountain in the municipality.
- Raúl "Pipote" Oliveras Vera Coliseum
- Susúa State Forest, shared with Sabana Grande.
- Tozza Castle, replica of a small castle in Corsica, built by the Gilormini family.

To stimulate local tourism, the Puerto Rico Tourism Company launched the Voy Turistiendo ("I'm Touring") campaign, with a passport book and website. The Yauco page lists the murals at Yaucromatic, the view from the top of a mountain in Sierra Alta called Pico Rodadero, the Refugio de Vida Silvestre del Embalse Lucchetti, and (for agritourism) a honey production farm in barrio Diego Hernandez called Apiturismo, as places of interest.

Former attractions (permanently closed):

- Volkyland Museum, dedicated to the Volkswagen Beetle or Bug.

== Economy ==
The main crops include coffee, plantains, oranges and tobacco. Yauco coffees are a revived specialty origin that display the qualities that made Jamaica Blue Mountain famous: A restrained acidity and rich flavor. However, this Caribbean coffee is often marred by inconsistency. Coffee production and sales from Yauco has reached faraway places such as Europe in the 1800s.Due to which, Cafe Yaucono is a well-known Puerto Rican coffee brand that is named after Yauco. Yauco also produces textiles and other light manufactured materials. Sartorius pharmaceuticals expanded their current operations there in mid 2019.

== Culture ==
=== Festivals and events ===
Yauco celebrates its patron saint festival in October. The Fiestas Patronales de Nuestra Virgen del Rosario is a religious and cultural celebration that generally features parades, games, artisans, amusement rides, regional food, and live entertainment.

Other festivals and events celebrated in Yauco include:

- Yauco National Coffee Festival – February
- Christmas Festival - December
- Festival Internacional de las Culturas – December

=== DNA Ancestry Tests ===
Recent genealogical DNA-based testing, which look at specific locations of a person's genome, in order to find or verify ancestral genealogical relationships or to estimate the ethnic mixture of an individual, have found significant Portuguese, Spanish, Native American, Corsican, Irish, Scottish, Germanic European, Italian, North African, West African and European Jewish DNA presence in individuals who are descendants from inhabitants who were born within the geographical area of Yauco and other parts of southwestern Puerto Rico.

These ethnicities have significantly influenced the local culture, to include food, art, some words used in the language, customs, beliefs, and music.

== Government ==
All municipalities in Puerto Rico are administered by a mayor, elected every four years. The current mayor of Yauco is Ángel "Luigi" Torres Ortiz, of the New Progressive Party (PNP). He was first elected at the 2016 general elections.

The city belongs to the Puerto Rico Senatorial district V, which is represented by two Senators. In 2024, Marially González Huertas and Jamie Barlucea, from the Popular Democratic Party and New Progressive Party, respectively, were elected as District Senators.

== Transportation ==
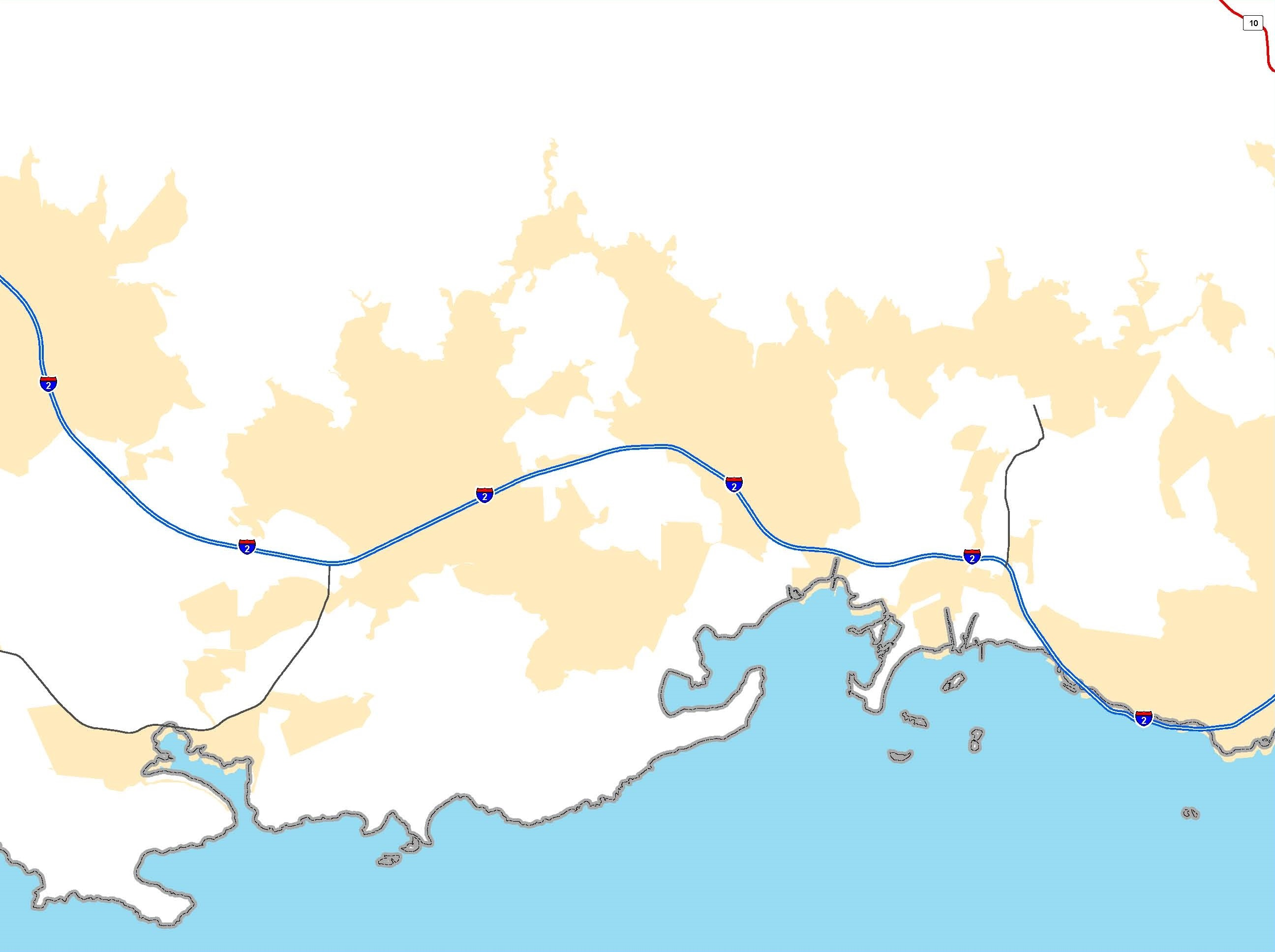
"Interstate" Highway PRI-2 goes through Yauco. Urbanized areas are shaded in peach

Interstate Highway PRI-2 goes through Yauco. The interstate highway is designated as such because it receives up to 90% of its funding from the US Interstate Highway System.

In 2019, there were 40 bridges in Yauco. A bridge that goes over Yauco River suffered damages during 2017 Hurricane Maria. A bridge that carries PR-359 would have to be demolished due to damages caused by the 2019–2020 Puerto Rico earthquakes.

== Symbols ==
The municipio has an official flag and coat of arms.

=== Flag ===
The flag of Yauco consists of two horizontal stripes of equal width, black the superior and gold the inferior one. The municipal coat of arms is in the center.

=== Coat of arms ===
The coat of arms of Yauco is quartered by a central cross representing Christendom. In a silver field a gold and black boiler, with seven necks and heads of black serpents in each handle, three to the right hand, confronted with four to the left-hand side. Bordered by a checkered band in gold and black. The second and third quarters, in a field of gold, two coffee plant flowers of five leaves of silver and four red. The coffee plant flower and the coffee grains represent their cultivation in the Yauco municipality. The border of the Arms represents the beads of the rosary. The four-tower crown represents its town status.

== Notable people ==
The following is a list of people born in Yauco.

- Elmer Román (born 1972) - 26th Secretary of State of Puerto Rico and 2nd Secretary of Public Safety of Puerto Rico
- Johnny Albino (1919–2011) – bolero vocalist
- Benny Ayala (born 1951) – 1983 World Series-winning left fielder for the Baltimore Orioles
- Carmelo Filardi - cartoonist who published El Mundo in 1927
- Harry Fraticelli (born 1944) - singer and musician
- Mihiel Gilormini (1918–1988) – airman of World War II. Founded the Puerto Rico Air National Guard
- Francisco Lluch Mora (1924–2006) – poet and history professor
- Antonio Mattei Lluberas (1857–1908) – leader of the Intentona de Yauco against Spanish rule
- Héctor Andrés Negroni (born 1938) – first Puerto Rican graduate of the United States Air Force Academy
- Mike Perez (born 1964) – 1990s Major League Baseball pitcher
- Francisco Rojas Tollinchi (1911–1965) – poet and journalist.
- José Semidei Rodríguez (1868–1958) – soldier in the Cuban Liberation Army in the Cuban War of Independence, later Cuban diplomat.
- Ray Suarez – alderman in the 31st ward of Chicago, Illinois since 1991
- Amaury Veray - pianist, composer, known for his song Villancico yaucano

== Gallery ==
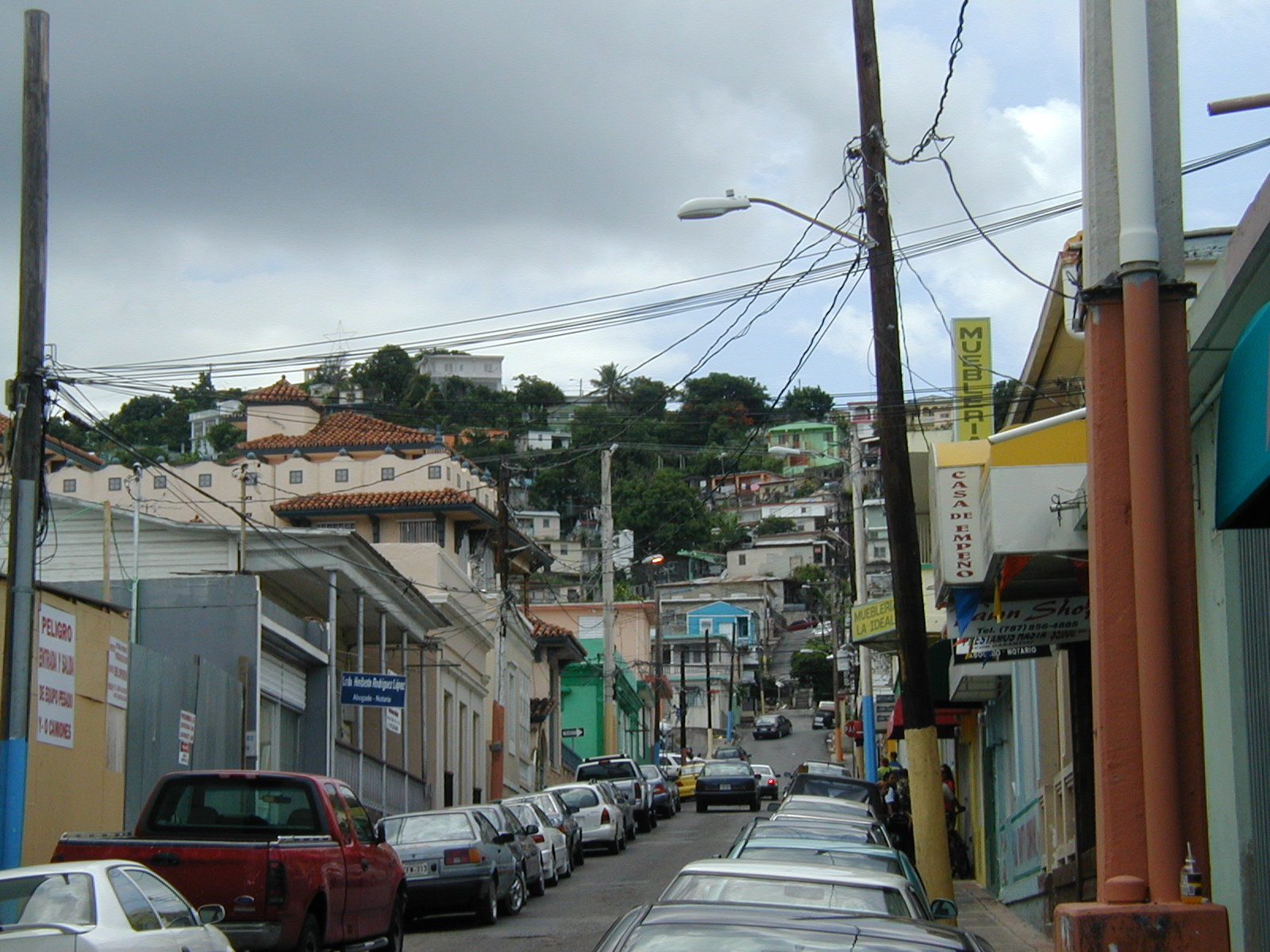
Street in downtown Yauco

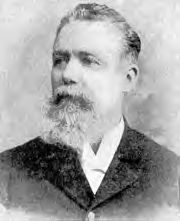
Antonio Mattei Lluberas, leader of the Intentona de Yauco

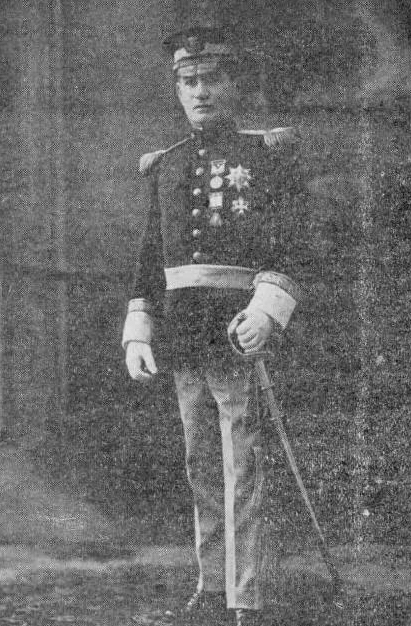
Brigadier General José Semidei Rodríguez, Cuban freedom fighter and diplomat

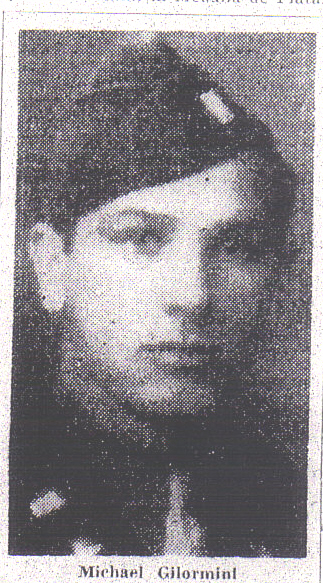
Brig. Gen. Mihiel Gilormini

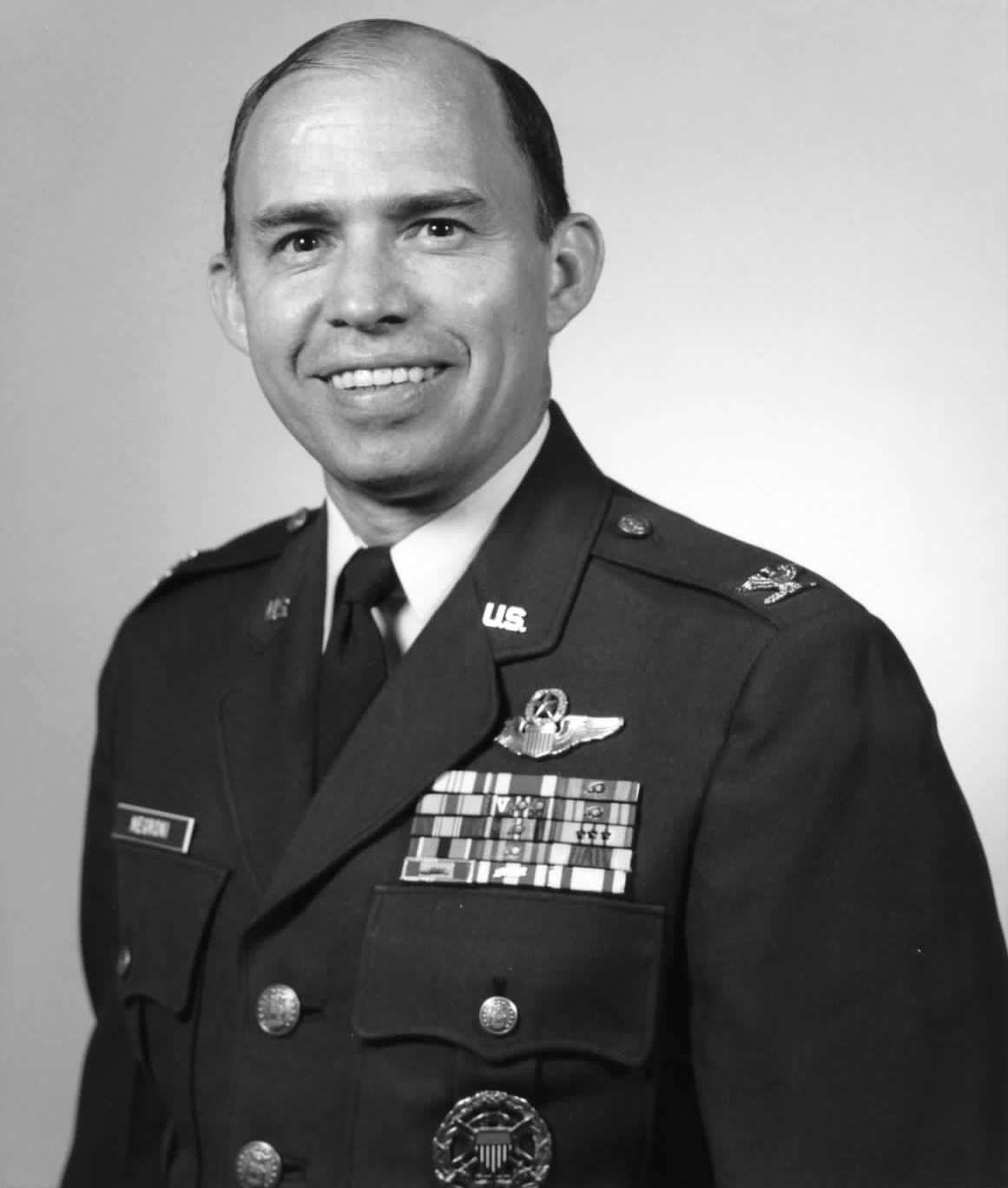
Colonel Héctor Andrés Negroni, U.S. Air Force

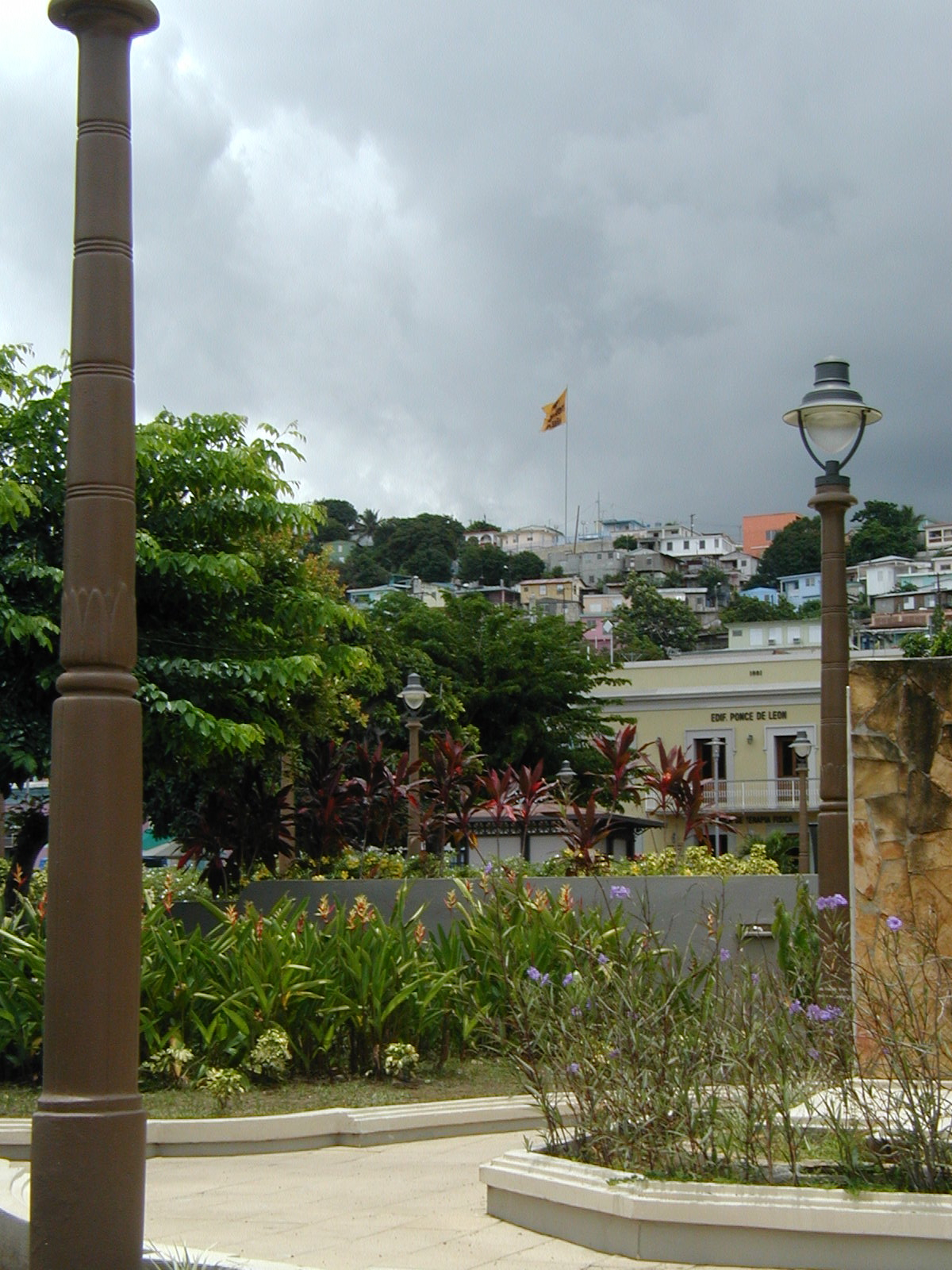
Central plaza in Yauco

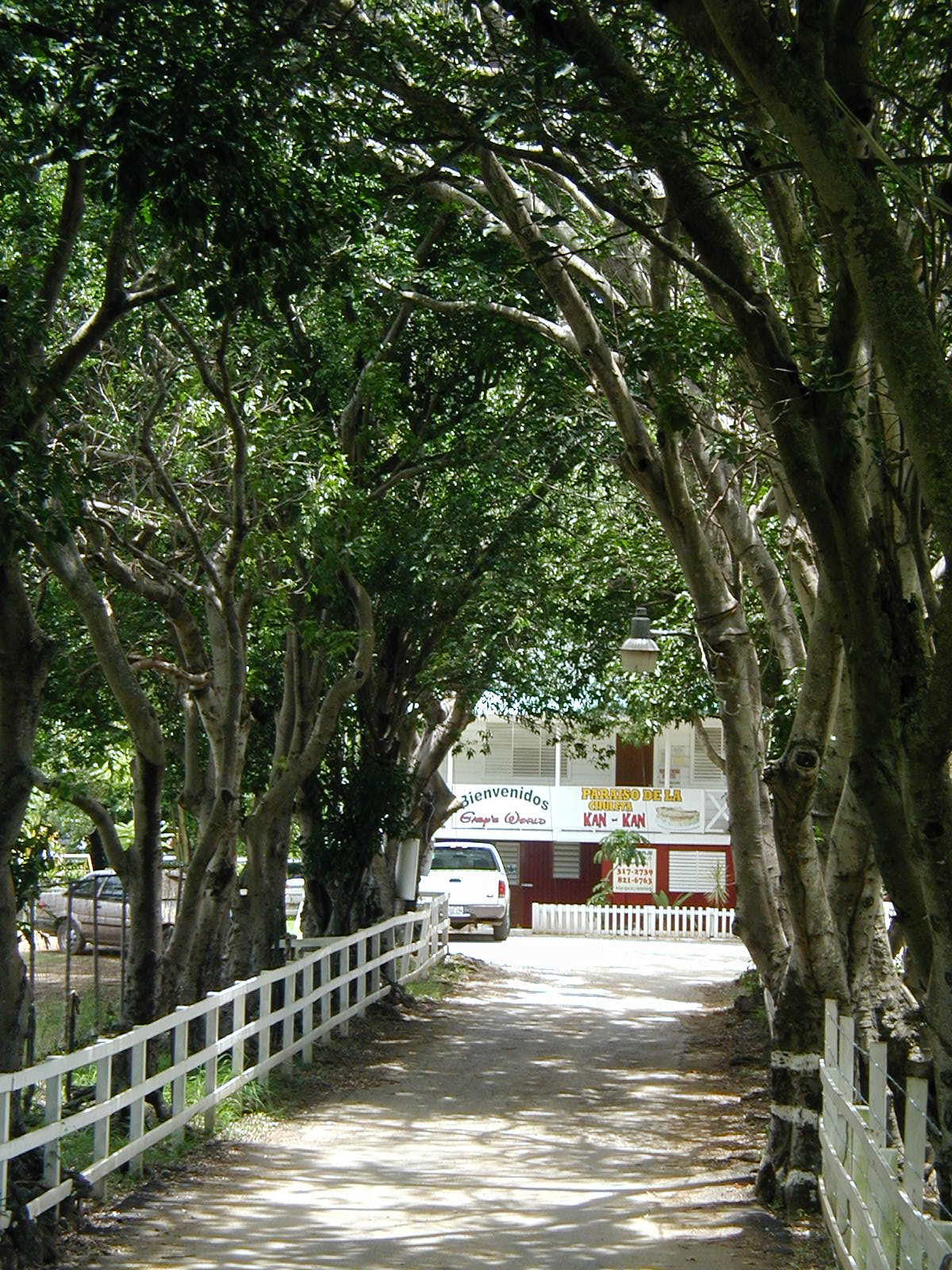
Gaby's restaurant in Yauco

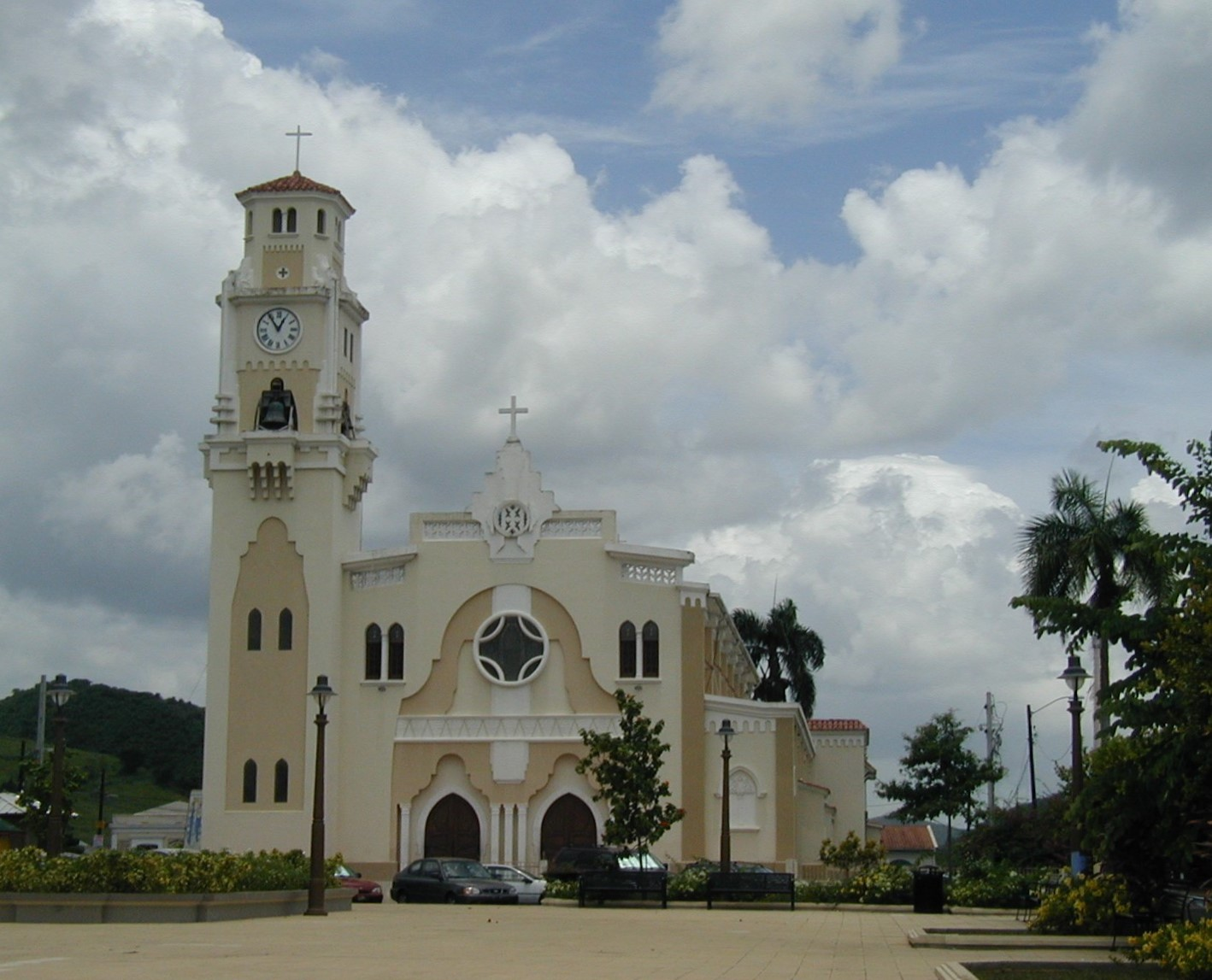
Catholic church in Yauco

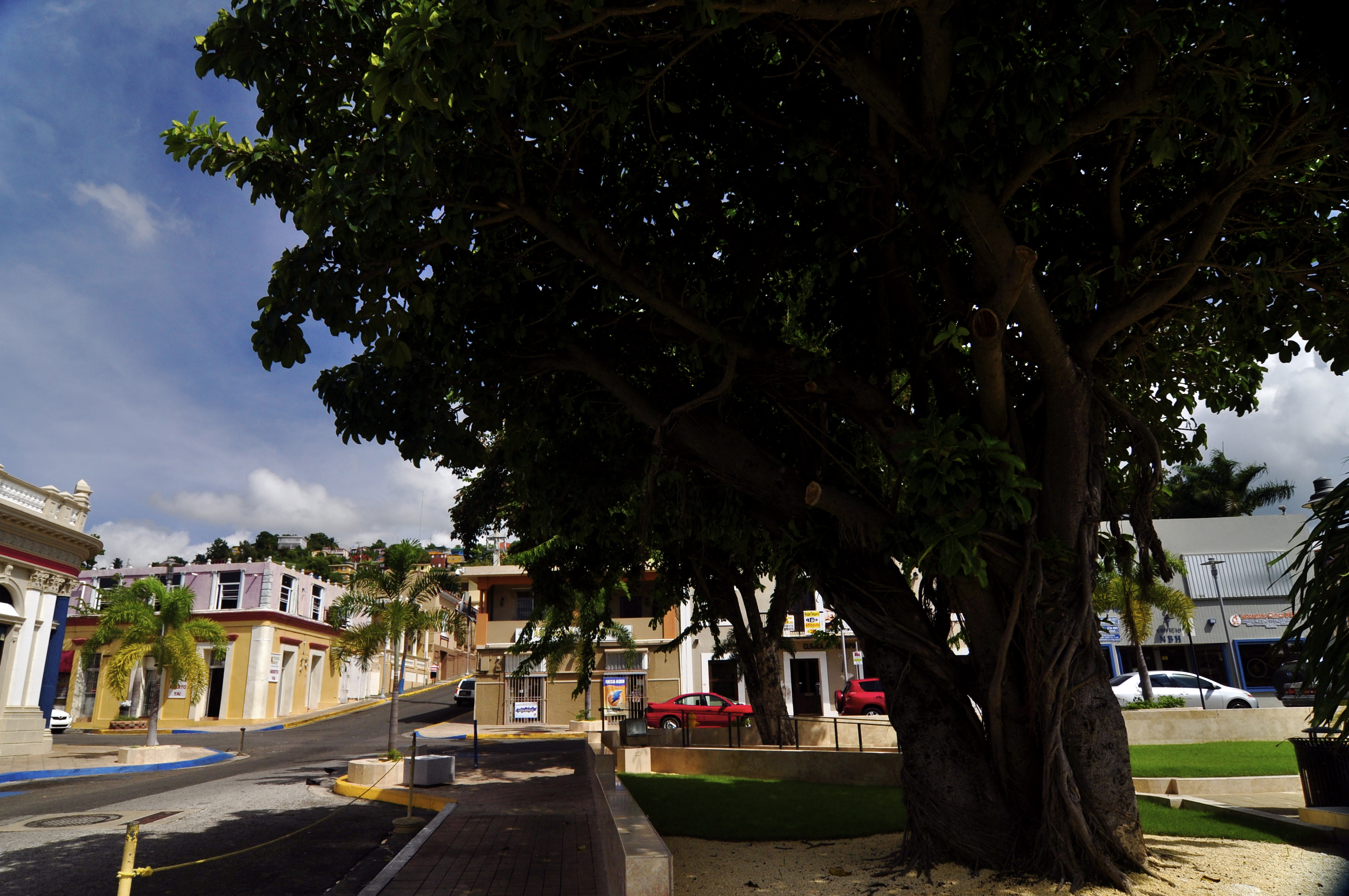
Central plaza in Yauco

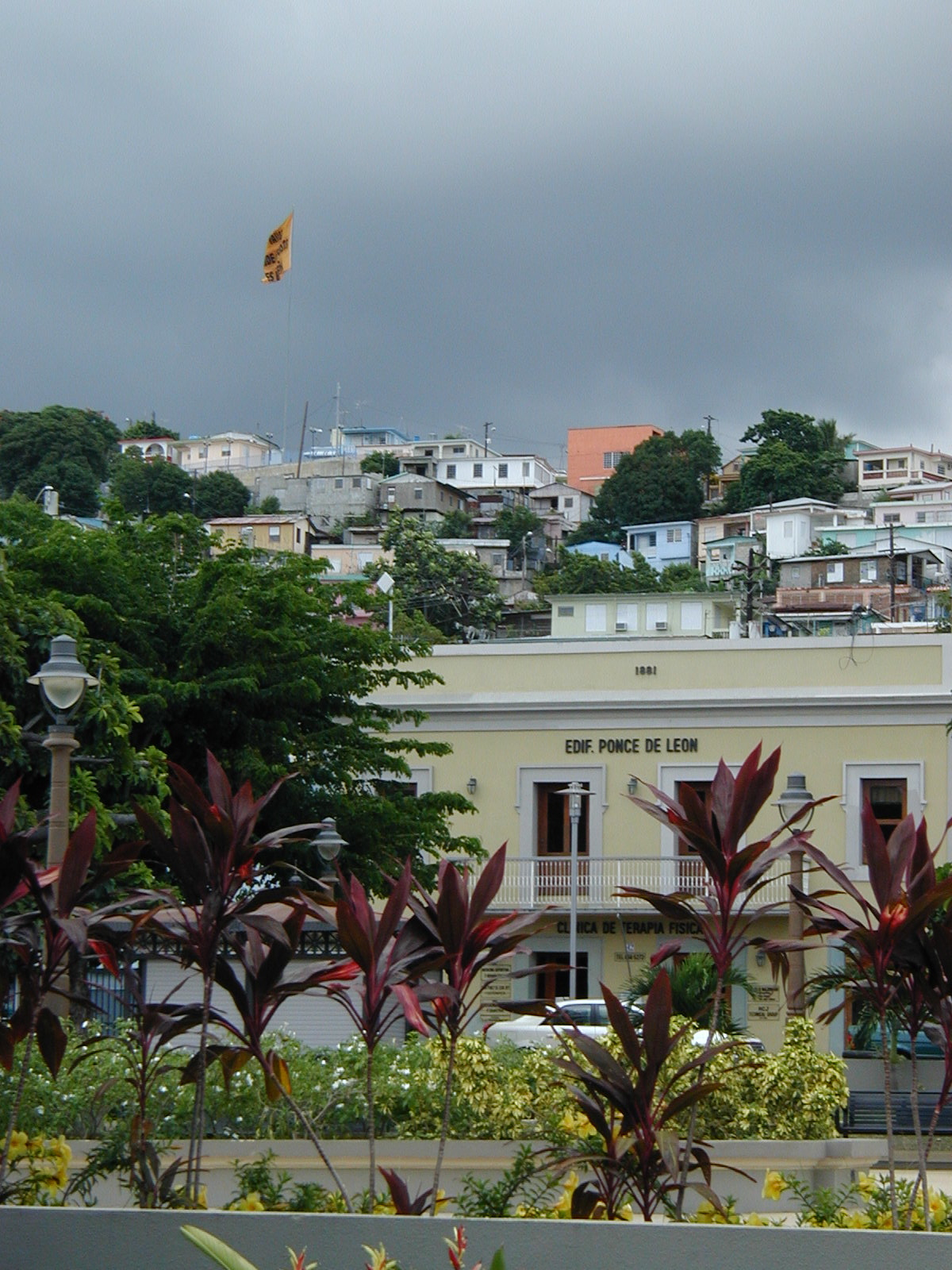
Houses on a hillside, view from Yauco barrio-pueblo

== See also ==
- List of Puerto Ricans
- Corsican immigration to Puerto Rico
- Battle of Yauco
- Intentona de Yauco
- History of Puerto Rico
- Did you know-Puerto Rico?
