= Frailes, Yauco, Puerto Rico =

Barrio of Puerto Rico

Frailes
- Barrio
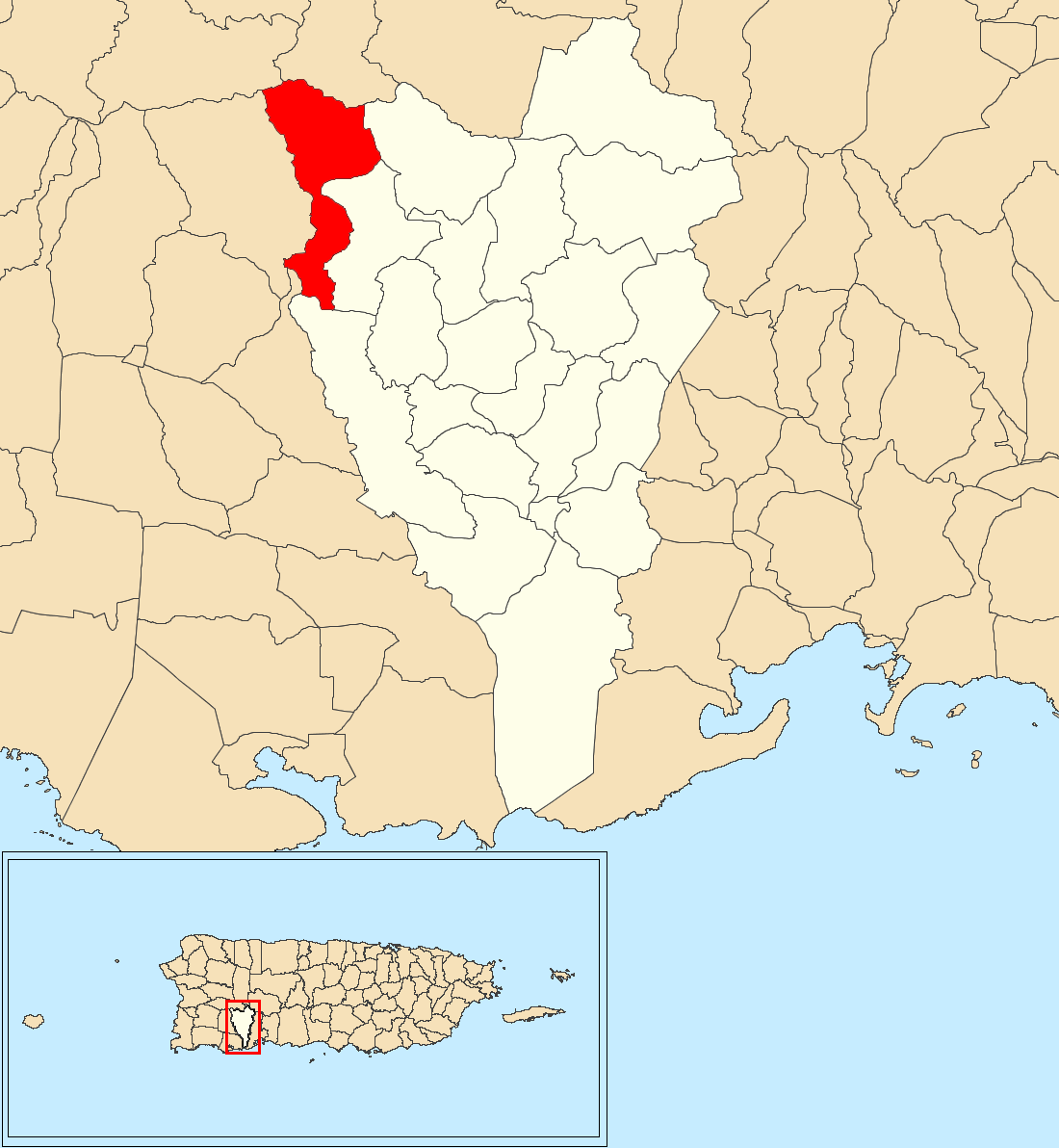
- Location of Frailes within the municipality of Yauco shown in red

- Location of Puerto Rico
- Coordinates: 18°07′46″N 66°54′38″W
- Commonwealth: Puerto Rico
- Municipality: Yauco

Area
  - Total: 3.92 sq mi (10.2 km^{2})
  - Land: 3.92 sq mi (10.2 km^{2})
  - Water: 0 sq mi (0 km^{2})
- Elevation: 1,657 ft (505 m)

Population (2010)
  - Total: 321
  - Density: 70.7/sq mi (27.3/km^{2})
- Source: 2010 Census
- Time zone: UTC−4 (AST)
- ZIP Code: 00698
- Area code: 787/939

Frailes is a barrio in the municipality of Yauco, Puerto Rico. Its population in 2010 was 321.

== History ==
Frailes was in Spain's gazetteers until Puerto Rico was ceded by Spain in the aftermath of the Spanish–American War under the terms of the Treaty of Paris of 1898 and became an unincorporated territory of the United States. In 1899, the United States Department of War conducted a census of Puerto Rico finding that the population of Frailes barrio was 919.

Historical population
Census	Pop.	Note	%±
1900	919		—
1910	644		−29.9%
1920	743		15.4%
1930	678		−8.7%
1940	743		9.6%
1950	588		−20.9%
1960	444		−24.5%
1970	437		−1.6%
1980	361		−17.4%
1990	233		−35.5%
2000	205		−12.0%
2010	321		56.6%
U.S. Decennial Census; 1899 (shown as 1900) 1910-1930; 1930-1950 1980-2000 2010

== See also ==
- List of communities in Puerto Rico
