= Rubias, Yauco, Puerto Rico =

Barrio of Puerto Rico

Rubias
- Barrio
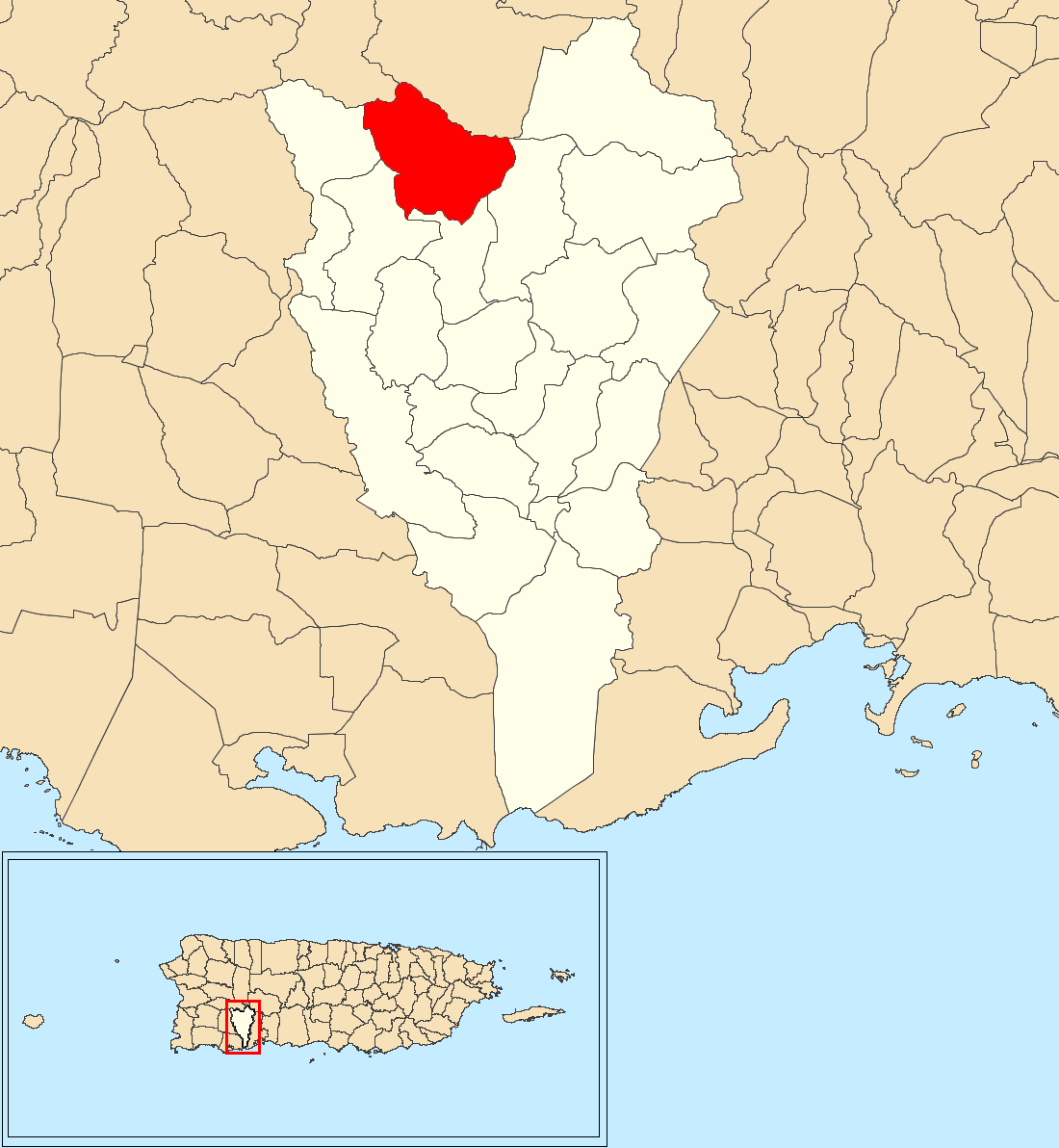
- Location of Rubias within the municipality of Yauco shown in red

- Location of Puerto Rico
- Coordinates: 18°08′00″N 66°52′46″W
- Commonwealth: Puerto Rico
- Municipality: Yauco

Area
  - Total: 4 sq mi (10 km^{2})
  - Land: 4 sq mi (10 km^{2})
  - Water: 0 sq mi (0 km^{2})
- Elevation: 1,660 ft (510 m)

Population (2010)
  - Total: 309
  - Density: 77.3/sq mi (29.8/km^{2})
- Source: 2010 Census
- Time zone: UTC−4 (AST)
- ZIP Code: 00698
- Area code: 787/939

Rubias is a barrio in the municipality of Yauco, Puerto Rico. Its population in 2010 was 309.

== History ==
Rubias was in Spain's gazetteers until Puerto Rico was ceded by Spain in the aftermath of the Spanish–American War under the terms of the Treaty of Paris of 1898 and became an unincorporated territory of the United States. In 1899, the United States Department of War conducted a census of Puerto Rico finding that the population of Rubias barrio was 627.

Historical population
| Census | Pop. | Note | %± |
|---|---|---|---|
| 1900 | 627 | | — |
| 1910 | 624 | | −0.5% |
| 1920 | 660 | | 5.8% |
| 1930 | 733 | | 11.1% |
| 1940 | 897 | | 22.4% |
| 1950 | 858 | | −4.3% |
| 1960 | 760 | | −11.4% |
| 1970 | 505 | | −33.6% |
| 1980 | 482 | | −4.6% |
| 1990 | 432 | | −10.4% |
| 2000 | 294 | | −31.9% |
| 2010 | 309 | | 5.1% |
U.S. Decennial Census; 1899 (shown as 1900) 1910-1930; 1930-1950 1980-2000 2010

== See also ==
- List of communities in Puerto Rico
