= Vegas, Yauco, Puerto Rico =

Barrio of Puerto Rico

Vegas
- Barrio
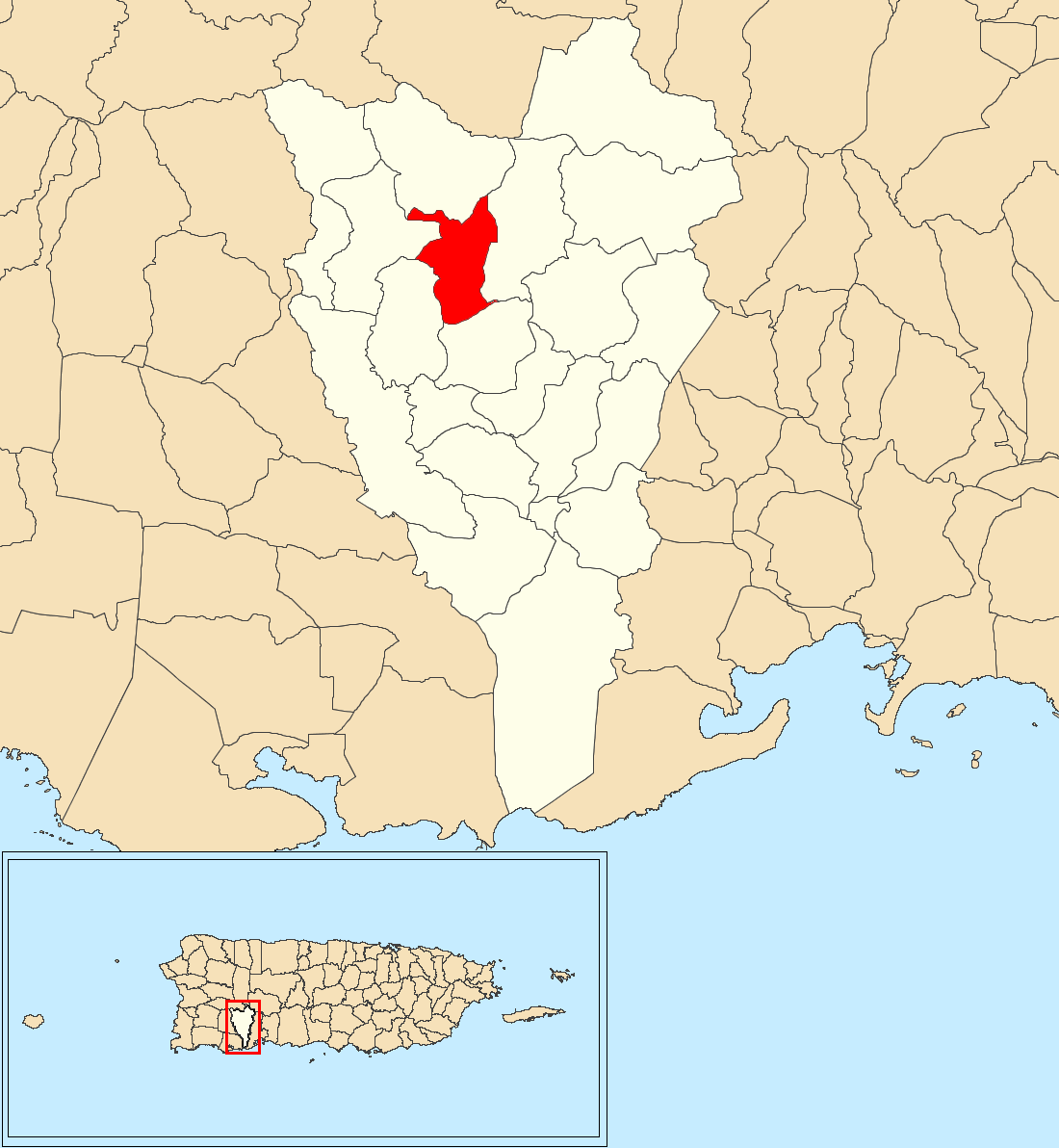
- Location of Vegas within the municipality of Yauco shown in red

- Location of Puerto Rico
- Coordinates: 18°06′12″N 66°52′23″W
- Commonwealth: Puerto Rico
- Municipality: Yauco

Area
  - Total: 1.99 sq mi (5.2 km^{2})
  - Land: 1.77 sq mi (4.6 km^{2})
  - Water: 0.22 sq mi (0.57 km^{2})
- Elevation: 686 ft (209 m)

Population (2010)
  - Total: 145
  - Density: 81.9/sq mi (31.6/km^{2})
- Source: 2010 Census
- Time zone: UTC−4 (AST)
- ZIP Code: 00698
- Area code: 787/939

Vegas is a barrio in the municipality of Yauco, Puerto Rico. Its population in 2010 was 145.

== History ==
Vegas was in Spain's gazetteers until Puerto Rico was ceded by Spain in the aftermath of the Spanish–American War under the terms of the Treaty of Paris of 1898 and became an unincorporated territory of the United States. In 1899, the United States Department of War conducted a census of Puerto Rico finding that the combined population of Vegas and Caimito barrios was 1,405.

Historical population
Census	Pop.	Note	%±
1910	621		—
1920	809		30.3%
1930	760		−6.1%
1940	758		−0.3%
1950	751		−0.9%
1960	643		−14.4%
1970	275		−57.2%
1980	164		−40.4%
1990	332		102.4%
2000	178		−46.4%
2010	145		−18.5%
U.S. Decennial Census; 1900 (N/A) 1910-1930; 1930-1950 1980-2000 2010

== See also ==
- List of communities in Puerto Rico
