= Collores, Yauco, Puerto Rico =

Barrio of Puerto Rico

Collores
- Barrio
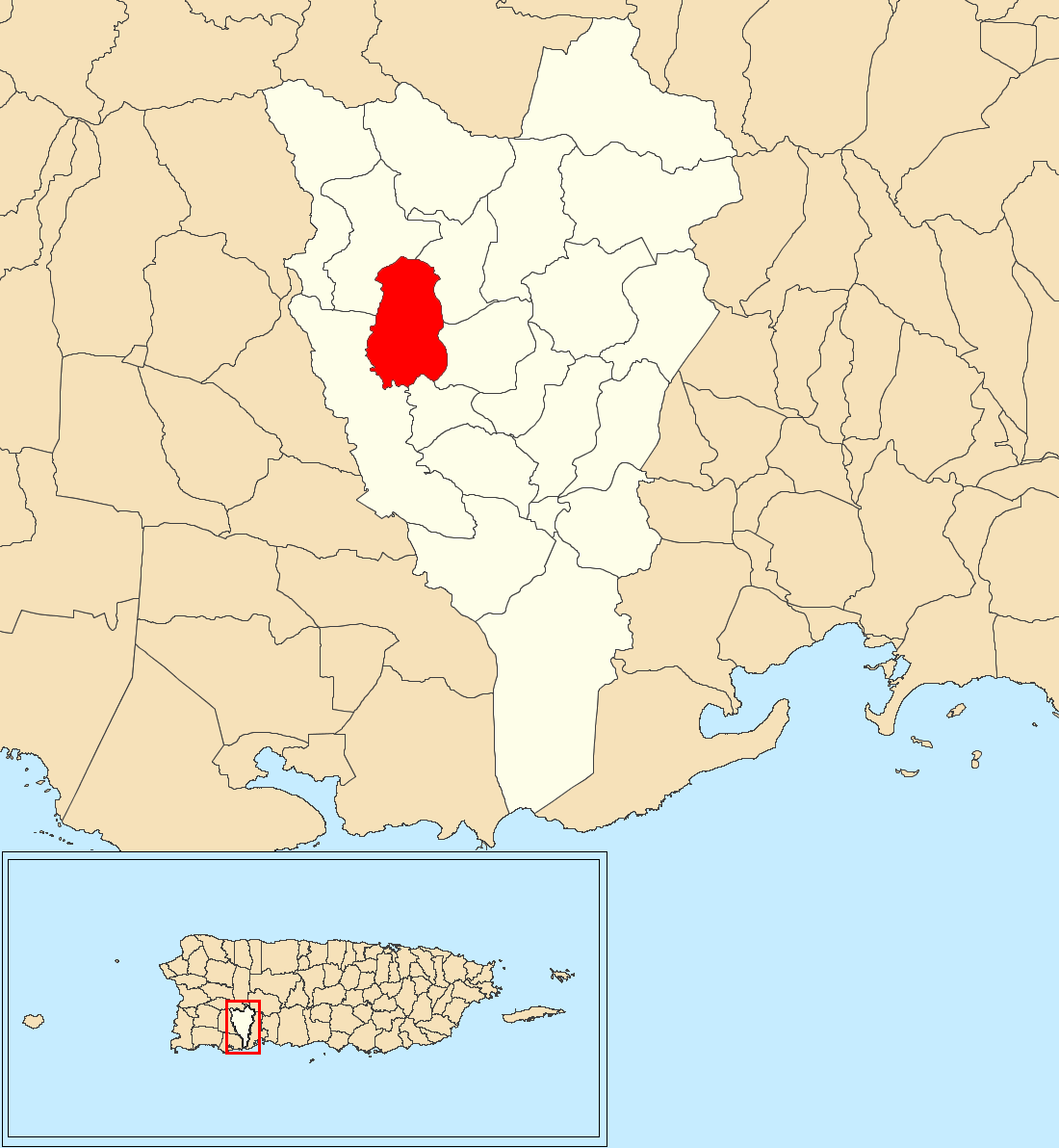
- Location of Collores within the municipality of Yauco shown in red

- Location of Puerto Rico
- Coordinates: 18°05′14″N 66°53′14″W
- Commonwealth: Puerto Rico
- Municipality: Yauco

Area
  - Total: 2.59 sq mi (6.7 km^{2})
  - Land: 2.59 sq mi (6.7 km^{2})
  - Water: 0 sq mi (0 km^{2})
- Elevation: 1,079 ft (329 m)

Population (2010)
  - Total: 773
  - Density: 298.5/sq mi (115.3/km^{2})
- Source: 2010 Census
- Time zone: UTC−4 (AST)
- ZIP Code: 00698
- Area code: 787/939

Collores is a barrio in the municipality of Yauco, Puerto Rico. Its population in 2010 was 773.

== History ==
Collores was in Spain's gazetteers until Puerto Rico was ceded by Spain in the aftermath of the Spanish–American War under the terms of the Treaty of Paris of 1898 and became an unincorporated territory of the United States. In 1899, the United States Department of War conducted a census of Puerto Rico finding that the population of Collores barrio was 893.

Historical population
Census	Pop.	Note	%±
1900	893		—
1910	816		−8.6%
1920	813		−0.4%
1930	613		−24.6%
1940	810		32.1%
1950	768		−5.2%
1960	948		23.4%
1970	917		−3.3%
1980	888		−3.2%
1990	817		−8.0%
2000	971		18.8%
2010	773		−20.4%
U.S. Decennial Census; 1899 (shown as 1900) 1910-1930; 1930-1950 1980-2000 2010

== See also ==
- List of communities in Puerto Rico
