= Yauco River =

River of Puerto Rico

Coordinates: 17.9819110°N 66.7987863°W

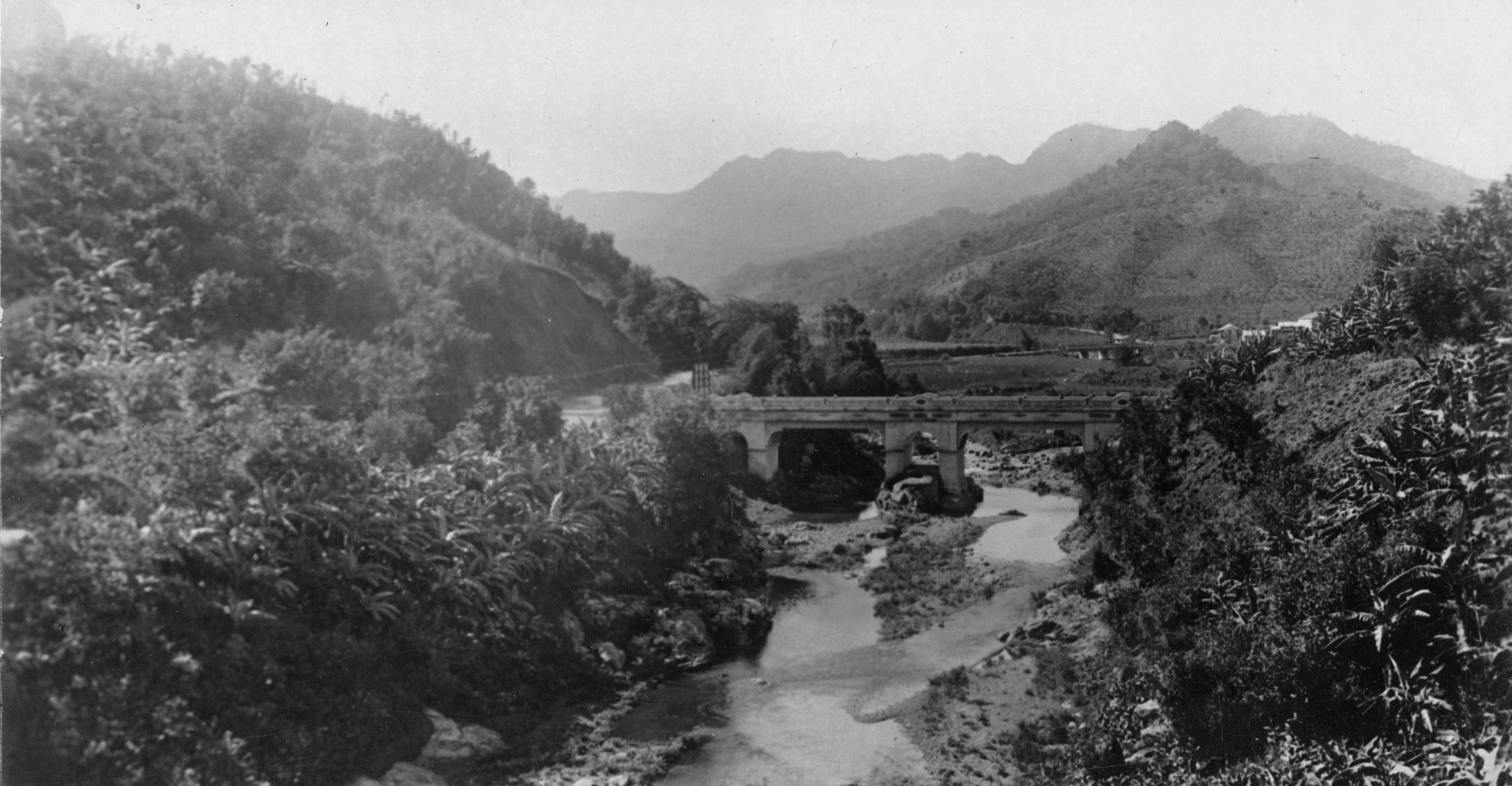
- Puente Las Vegas over the Río Yauco in 1935
- Native name: Río Yauco (Spanish)

Location
- Commonwealth: Puerto Rico
- Municipality: Guayanilla, Yauco

The Yauco River (Spanish: Río Yauco) is a river that goes through Guayanilla and Yauco, municipalities in Puerto Rico.

The Antonio Lucchetti Dam and Reservoir is on the Yauco River.

== Hurricane Maria ==
Significant rainfall from Hurricane Maria on September 20, 2017 caused the Yauco River to overflow, flooding and decimating entire neighborhoods.

== Gallery ==
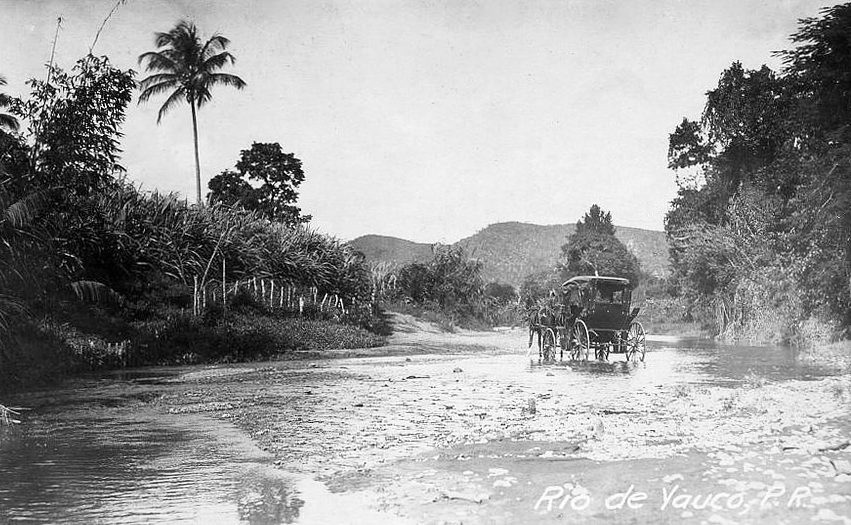
Yauco River, circa 1907

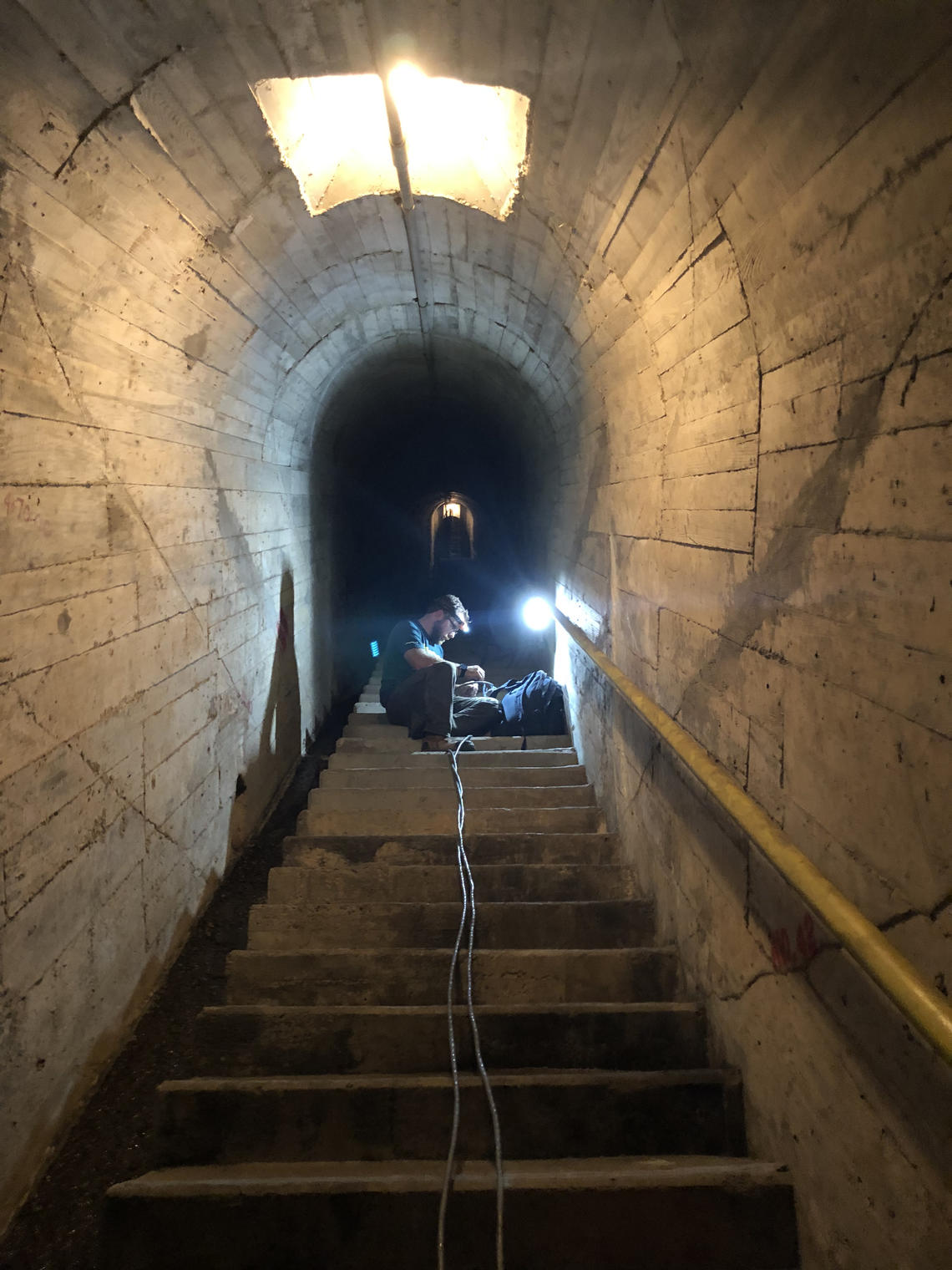
Antonio Lucchetti Dam on the Yauco River

== See also ==
- List of rivers of Puerto Rico
