= La Parguera Nature Reserve =

Protected area in Puerto Rico

- Reserva Natural de la Parguera
- IUCN category V (protected landscape/seascape)
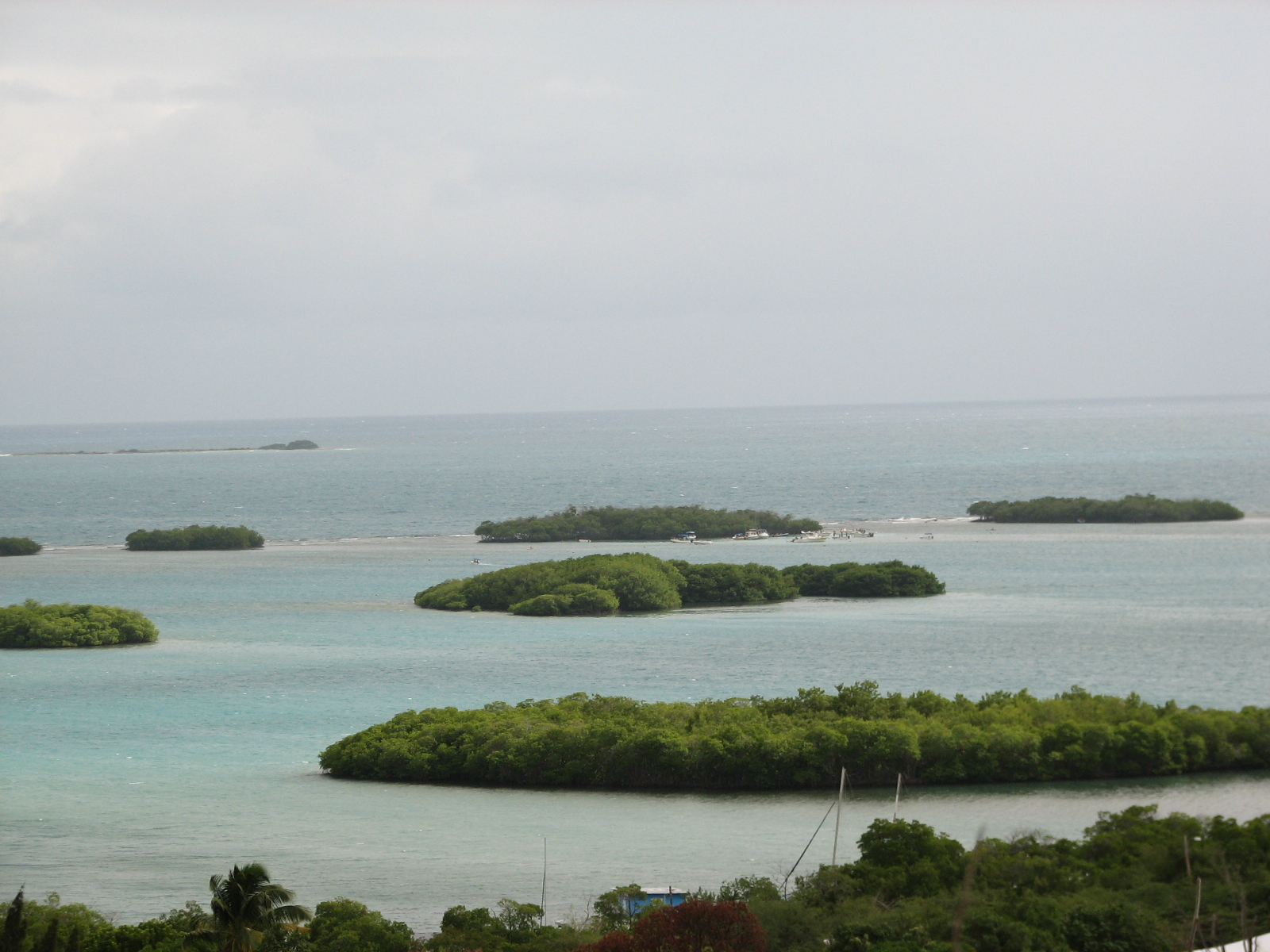
- La Parguera cays

- Location within Puerto Rico
- Location: Parguera, Lajas, Puerto Rico
- Nearest city: Lajas, Puerto Rico
- Coordinates: 17°58′36″N 67°00′44″W
- Area: 652.03 cda (633.27 acres)
- Established: September 20, 1979
- Governing body: Puerto Rico Department of Natural and Environmental Resources (DRNA)

La Parguera Nature Reserve (Spanish: Reserva Natural de la Parguera) is a protected area located in southwestern coast of the main island of Puerto Rico, primarily in the municipality of Lajas but also covering cays and islets under the municipal jurisdictions of Guánica and Cabo Rojo. The nature reserve is itself a unit of the Boquerón State Forest and it protects the Bahía Montalva mangrove forest in addition to mangrove bays, salt marshes and lagoons located along the coast of the Parguera barrio of Lajas, including its numerous cays and coral reefs. The reserve is mostly famous for its bioluminescent bay, locally called Bahía Fosforecente, (Spanish for 'phosphorescent bay'), one of the three of its kind in Puerto Rico and one of the seven year-round places where bioluminescent can be seen in the Caribbean.

== Geography ==
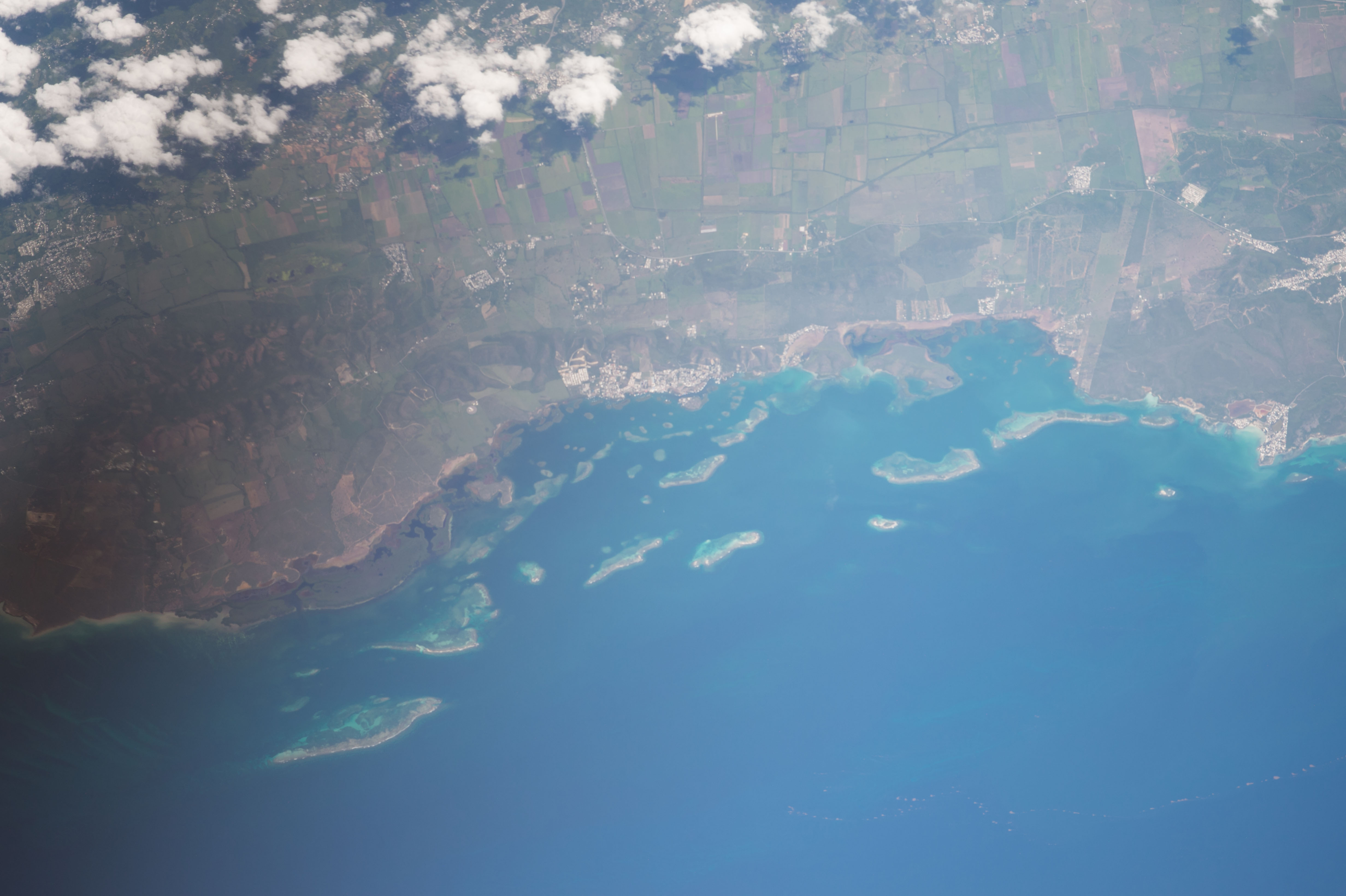
Satellite view of La Parguera bay

The nature reserve is centered around La Parguera Bay, a large body of located immediately south of the town of Parguera (Poblado de Parguera). This body of water is surrounded by heavily forested bays, some of which include Puerto Quijano, Bahía Fosforecente, Bahía Monsio José, and Bahía Montalva. It also contains numerous cays and islets, such as Isla Mata la Gata, Cayo Caracoles, Cayo Media Luna, Cayo El Palo, Cayo San Cristóbal, Cayo Laurel, Cayo El Turrumote and Isla Mattei. The general area is bound to the north by the Sierra Bermeja and the Lajas Valley, and to the south by the Caribbean Sea.

=== Geology ===
The reserve is located in the Southern Puerto Rico karst region, characterized by reddish limestone. The area is also traversed by the recently discovered Punta Montalva fault, which was responsible for the 2019–20 Puerto Rico earthquakes.

== Ecology ==
The environment of the nature reserve belongs to the Puerto Rican dry forest and Greater Antilles mangroves ecoregions. Administratively, La Parguera Nature Reserve is intended to protect an ecological corridor between the Boquerón and Guánica State Forests. The bay is also rich in coral reefs such as La Pared, a 20-mile-deep outcrop notable for its coral colonies and numerous fish and stingrays.

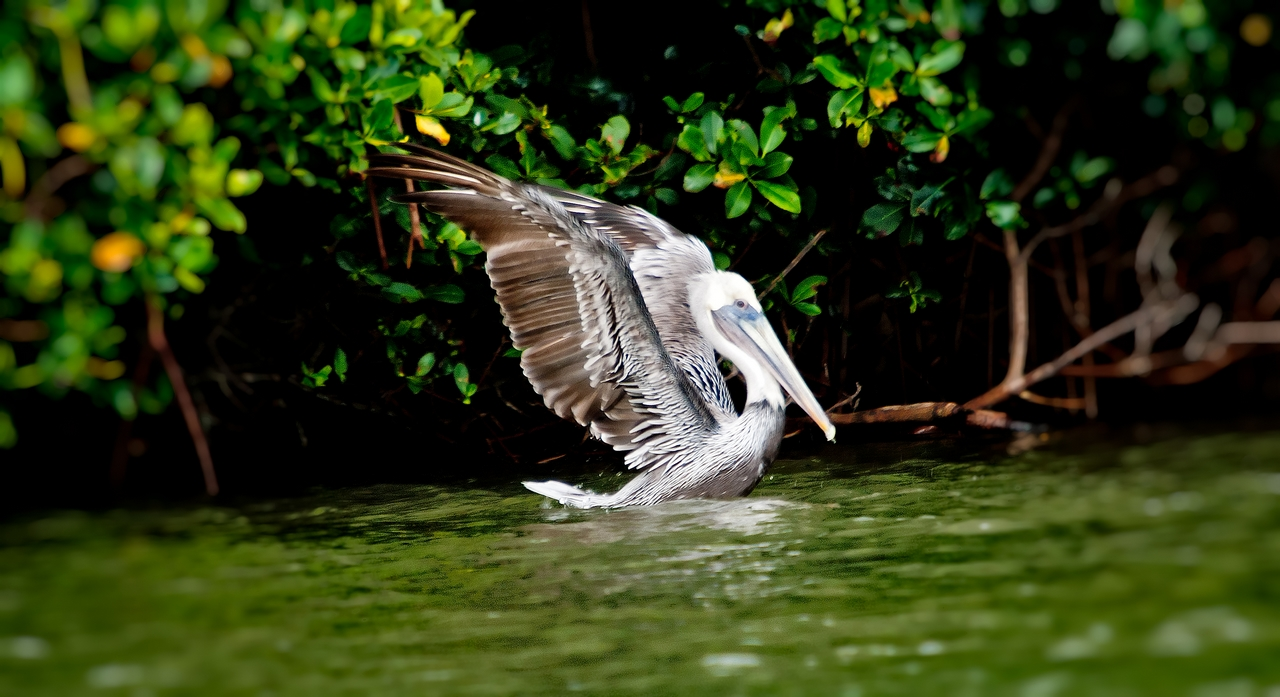
Brown pelican

=== Fauna ===
Some of the most common animal species in the reserve include Adelaide's warbler (Setophaga adelaidae), brown pelicans (Pelecanus occidentalis), mangrove cuckoos (Coccyzus minor), Puerto Rican crescent sphaero (Sphaerodactylus nicholsi) and the Puerto Rican tody (Todus mexicanus). The protection of several endangered animal species such as manatees (Trichechus manatus), Cook's anole (Anolis cooki), the Puerto Rican nightjar (Antrostomus noctitherus) and the Yellow-shouldered blackbird (Agelaius xanthomus) was another reason for the official nature reserve designation. La Parguera is a federally designated critical habitat particularly for the West Indian manatee and the yellow-shouldered blackbird.

=== Flora ===
Key plant species in the nature reserve include the almacigo (Bursera simaruba), bullet trees (Terminalia buceras), guayacan (Guaiacum sanctum), key thatch palms (Thrinax morisii), pink manjack (Tabebuia heterophylla), pipe organ cacti (Pilosocereus armatus, syn. P. royenii var. amatus), Turk's cap cacti (Melocactus intortus), and the endangered species guaiacwood (Guaiacum officinale), the sebucan (Leptocereus quadricostatus) and uña de gato (Pithecellobium unguis-cati). The area is also home to the extremely rare and critically endangered Psychilis krugii orchid.

== History ==
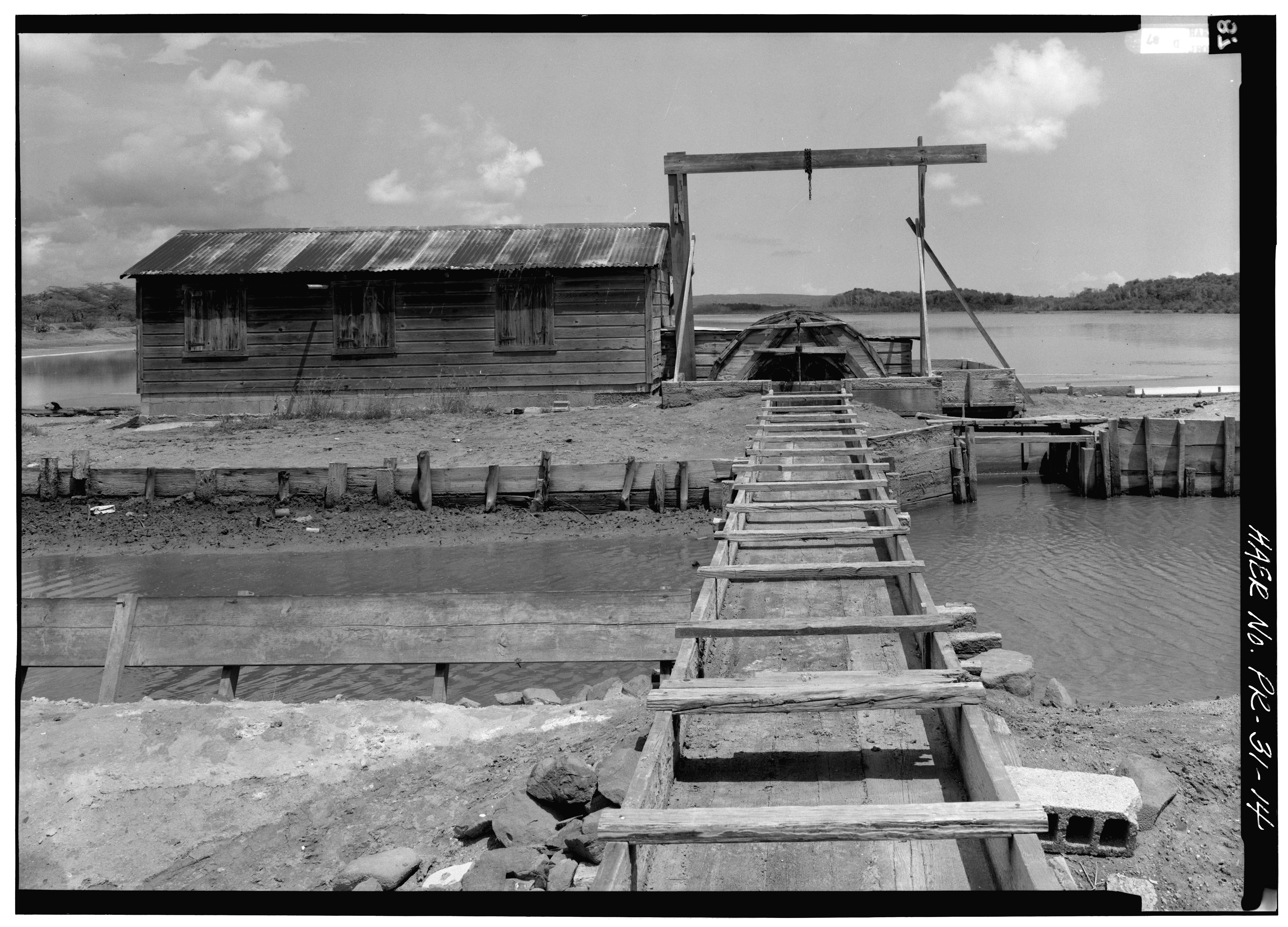
Fortuna salt evaporation ponds

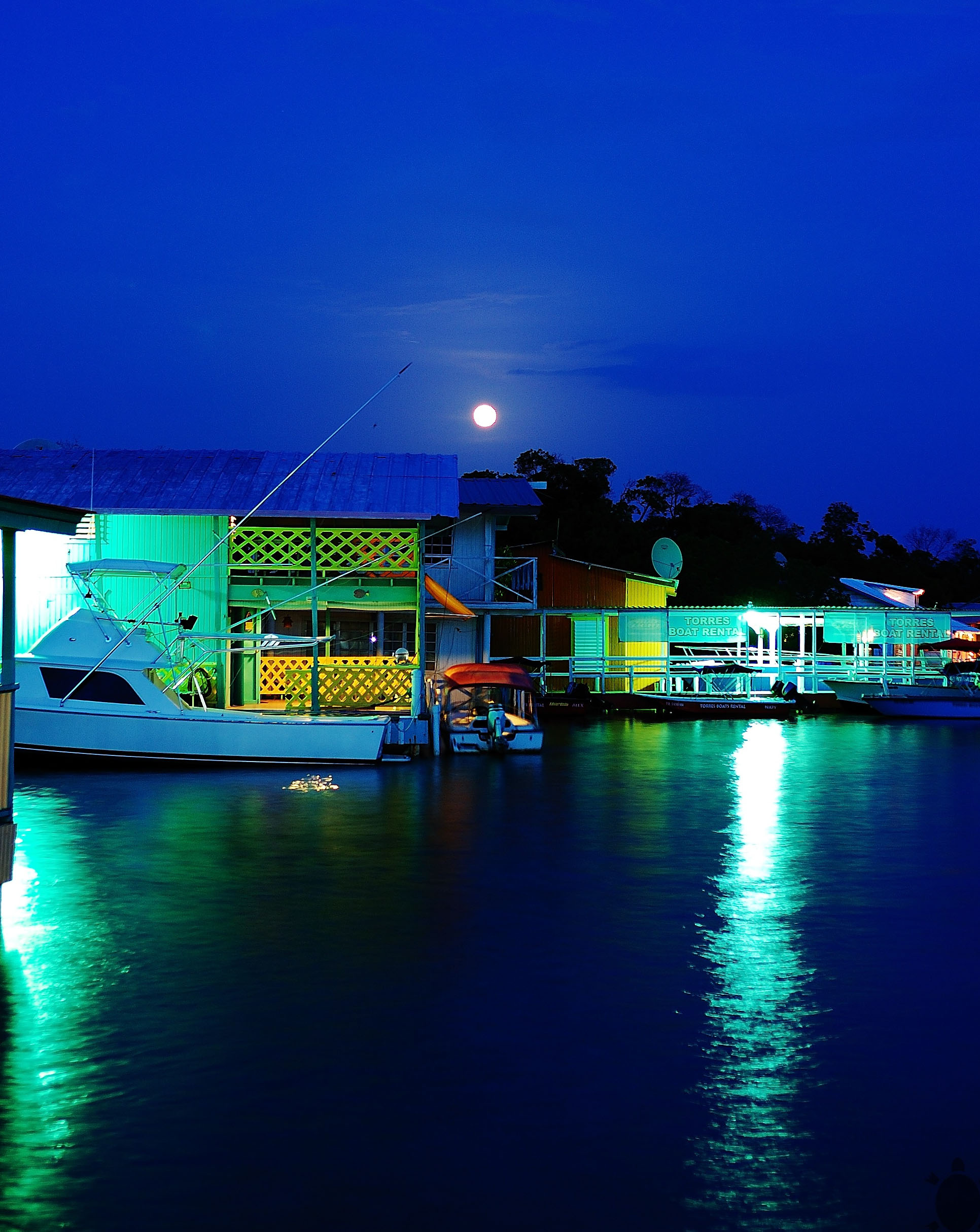
Villa Parguera

There is evidence in and around Isla Mattei that the area was inhabited by the Taino by the time of the Spanish conquest of Puerto Rico. Due to the swampy and dense mangrove forest cover of the area, it remained undeveloped for most of its history. During the 18th century the developed portions of the area formed part of sugarcane farms and haciendas, most notably Hacienda Fortuna and Finca Botoncillo. Corsican-Puerto Rican businessman Don Francisco Antonio Mattey was the owner and proprietor of these terrains, and the cay Isla Mattei is named after him. The salt marshes located immediately to the north and the northeast of the bioluminescent bay were further developed as salt evaporation ponds during the late 18th and early 19th-centuries.

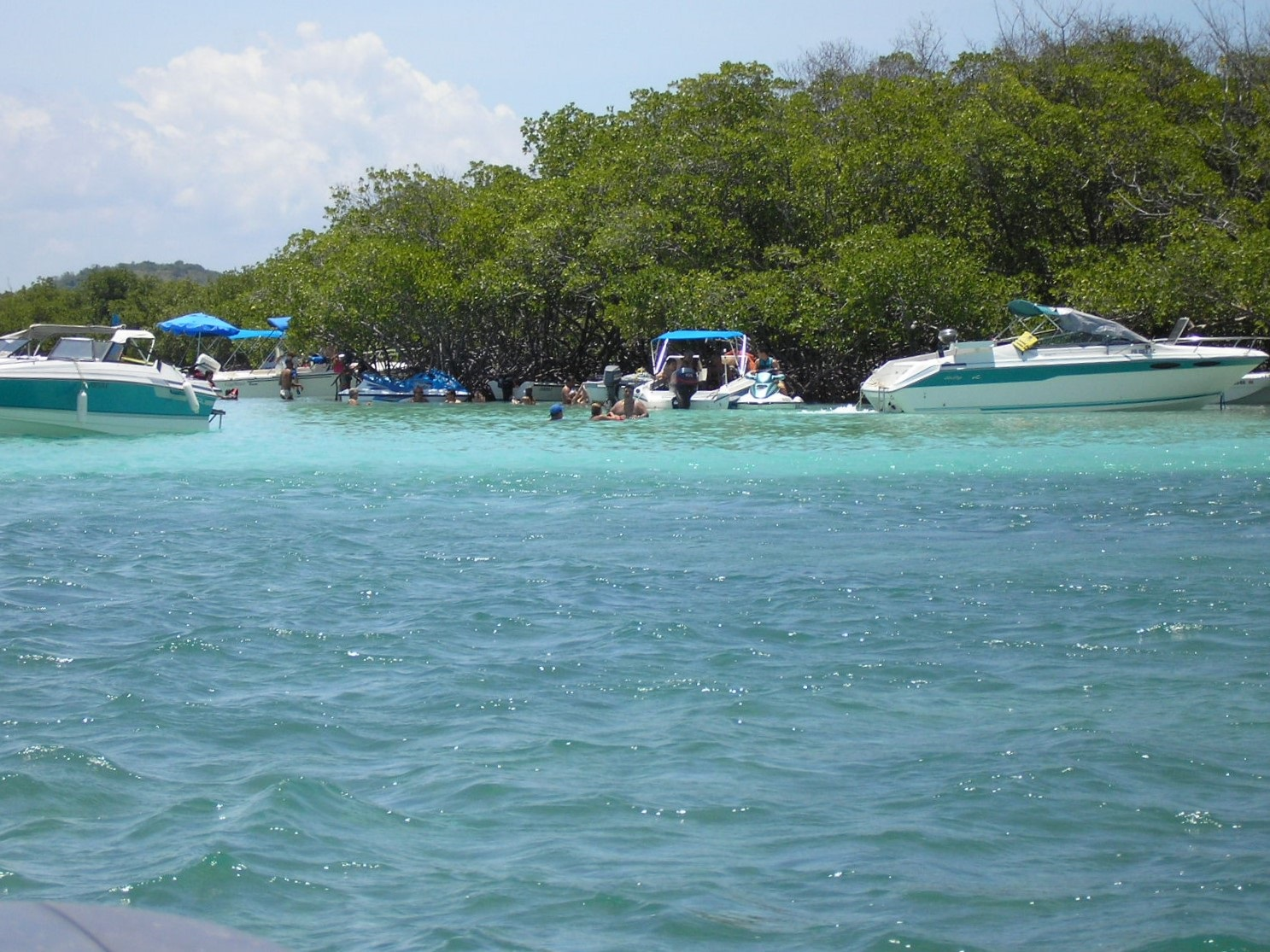
Tourist and boat activity (2005)

The town of Parguera (Poblado de Parguera), also known as simply La Parguera, was first settled as a fishing village (villa pesquera) in 1825 as Villa Parguera (also the official name of the settlement), meaning 'red snapper village' after the prominence of Northern red snapper (Lutjanus campechanus) in the area. The local fishing industry however soon diminished due to overfishing and the economy quickly transitioned to tourism as the main local industry during the 20th century. Tourism boomed with the establishment of Parador Villa Parguera by comedian and tourism businessman Henry LaFont during the 1960s. The quick development prompted the establishment of a zone of ecological protection, and, in 1972, the federal government established the Coastal Zone Management Law (Ley de Manejo de la Zona Costanera) included the area as a critical zone of protection. The Puerto Rico Department of Natural and Environmental Resources (DRNA) further established the Puerto Rico Coastal Zone Management Program (Programa de Manejo de la Zona Costanera de Puerto Rico) to mitigate the impact of tourism development in the coastal zones of the territory. The nature reserve was finally designated on September 20, 1979, making it the official fifth nature reserve in Puerto Rico after La Esperanza (1975), Punta Yeguas (1975), Punta Guaniquilla (1977) and La Cordillera Reef (1978).

Although tourism has proven to be the lifeline of the community it has brought negative impact onto the environment with the destruction of mangroves to build hotels, such as Parador Villa Parguera, and holiday residences, and the busy boating activity around the cays and reefs which at times has proven fatal to local animal communities such as manatees. Human activity has also proven disastrous for the bioluminescence in the area with Bahía Fosforecente now being the most endangered and least preserved out of the three bio bays in Puerto Rico.

== See also ==
- Boquerón State Forest
- Puerto Mosquito
