= Liano =

Liano is a surname. Notable people with the surname include:

- Bettina Liano (born 1966), Italian-Australian fashion designer
- Gina Liano (born 1966), Italian-Australian barrister and television personality

== See also ==
- Liaño (disambiguation)
- Lianos (disambiguation)
- Llano (disambiguation)
