= Palmarejo, Lajas, Puerto Rico =

Barrio of Puerto Rico

Palmarejo
- Barrio
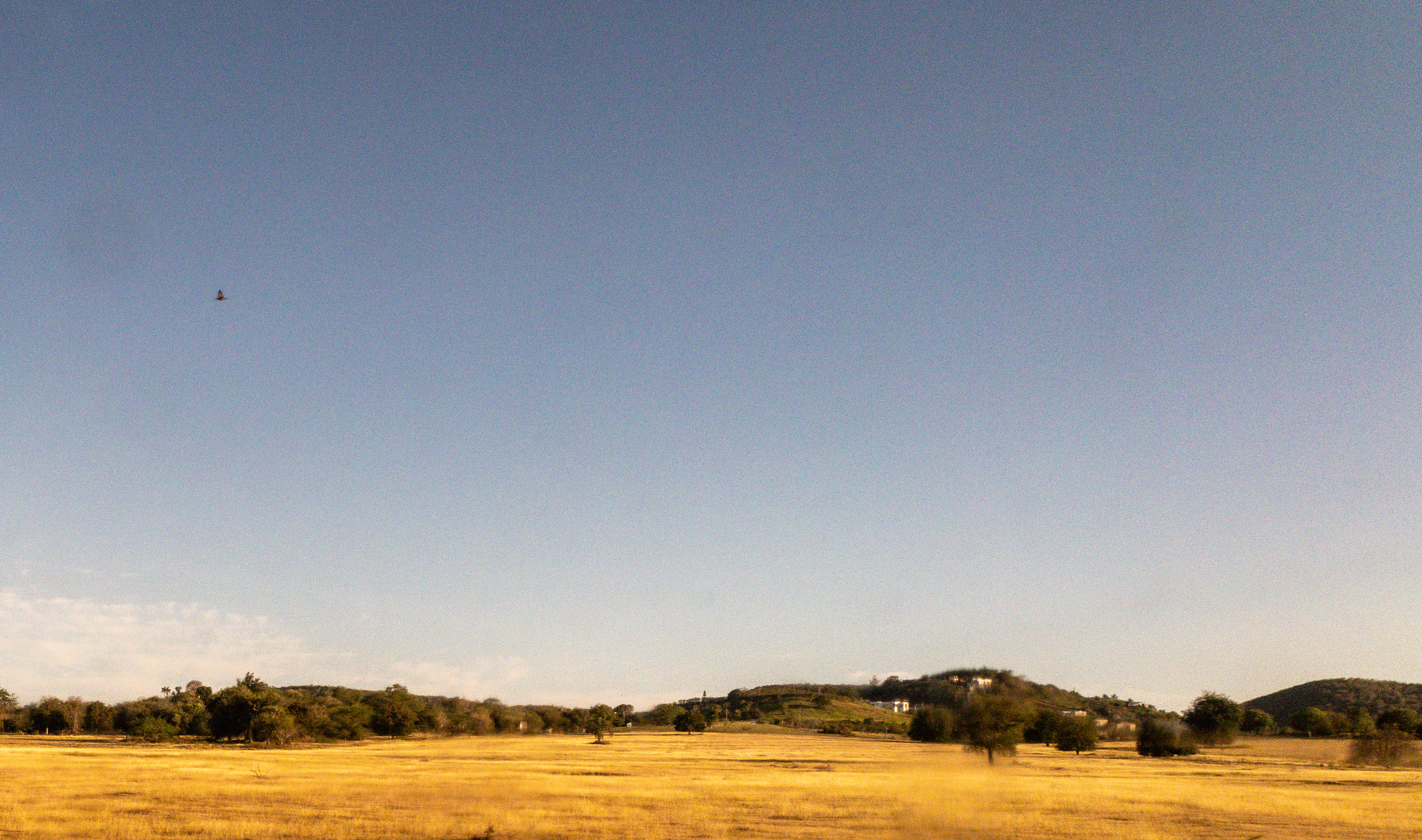
- Lajas Valley in Palmarejo

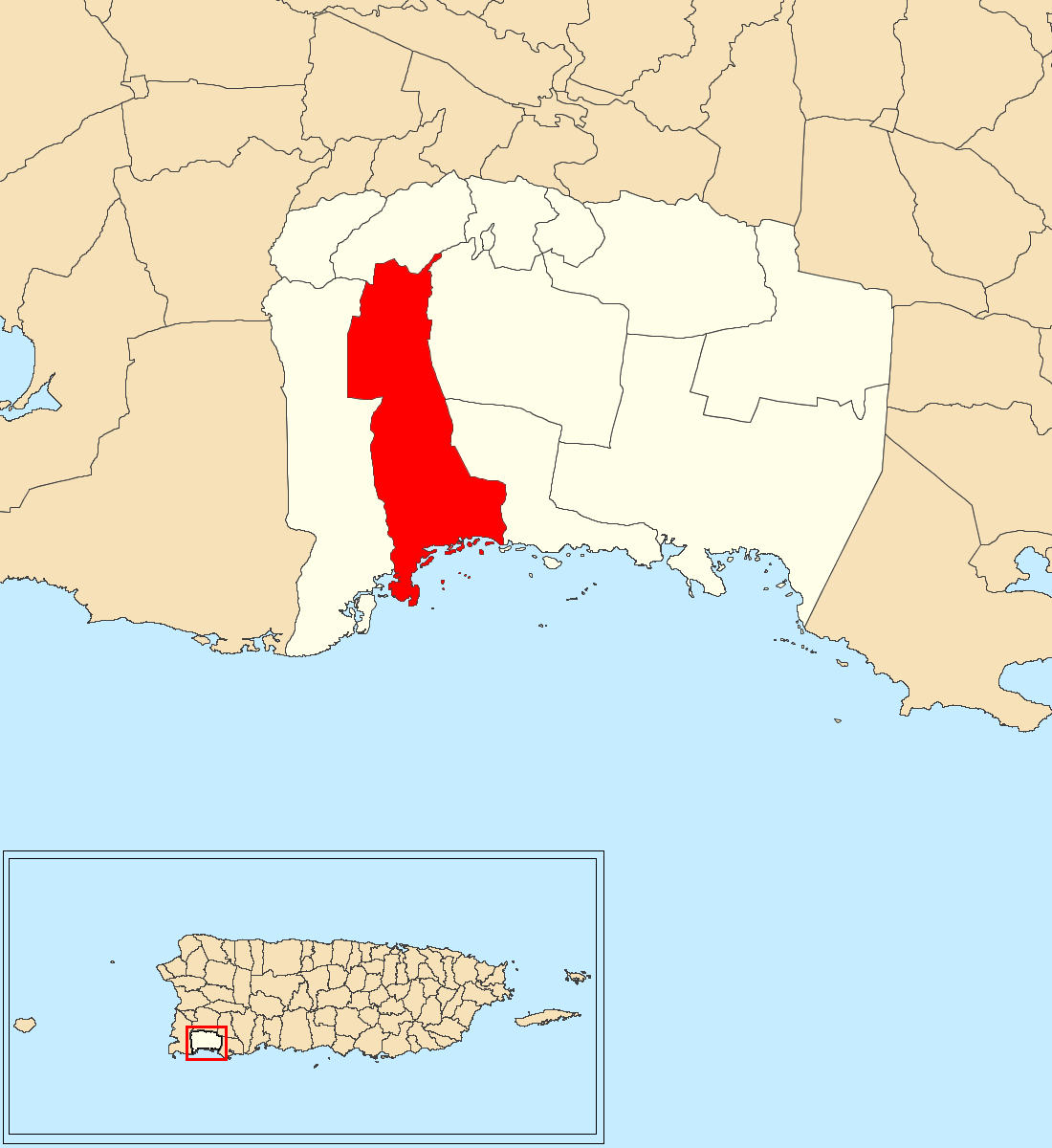
- Location of Palmarejo within the municipality of Lajas shown in red

- Location of Puerto Rico
- Coordinates: 17°59′20″N 67°04′45″W
- Commonwealth: Puerto Rico
- Municipality: Lajas

Area
  - Total: 9.26 sq mi (24.0 km^{2})
  - Land: 7.22 sq mi (18.7 km^{2})
  - Water: 2.04 sq mi (5.3 km^{2})
- Elevation: 151 ft (46 m)

Population (2010)
  - Total: 3,750
  - Density: 519.4/sq mi (200.5/km^{2})
- Source: 2010 Census
- Time zone: UTC−4 (AST)

Palmarejo is a barrio in the municipality of Lajas, Puerto Rico. Its population in 2010 was 3,750.

== History ==
Palmarejo was in Spain's gazetteers until Puerto Rico was ceded by Spain in the aftermath of the Spanish–American War under the terms of the Treaty of Paris of 1898 and became an unincorporated territory of the United States. In 1899, the United States Department of War conducted a census of Puerto Rico finding that the combined population of Palmarejo and Llanos barrios was 1,160.

Historical population
Census	Pop.	Note	%±
1910	896		—
1920	1,037		15.7%
1930	1,154		11.3%
1940	1,156		0.2%
1950	1,500		29.8%
1960	2,241		49.4%
1970	2,778		24.0%
1980	3,405		22.6%
1990	3,678		8.0%
2000	4,117		11.9%
2010	3,750		−8.9%
U.S. Decennial Census; 1900 (N/A) 1910-1930; 1930-1950 1980-2000 2010

== See also ==
- List of communities in Puerto Rico
