= París, Lajas, Puerto Rico =

Barrio of Puerto Rico

París
- Barrio
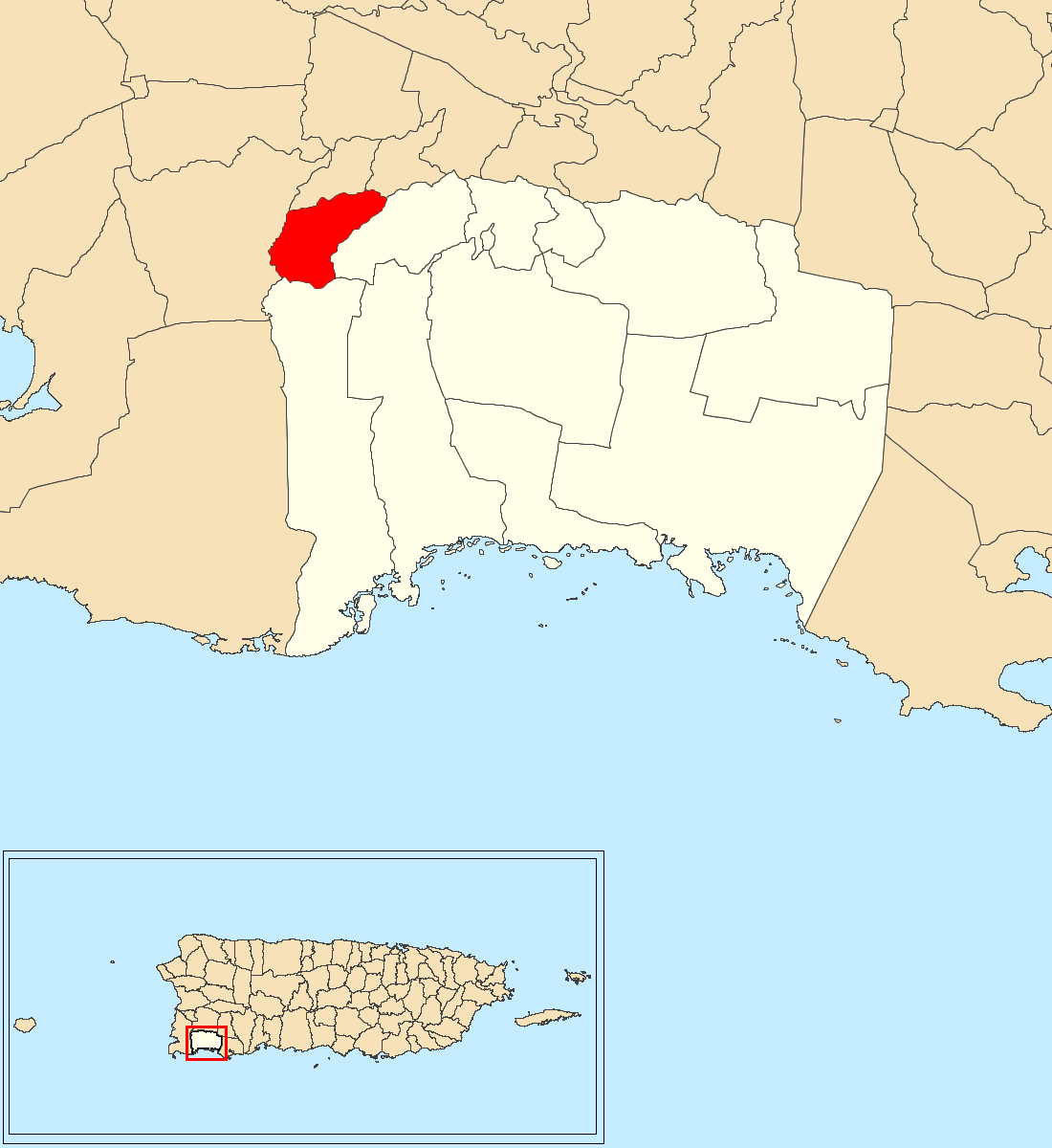
- Location of París within the municipality of Lajas shown in red

- Location of Puerto Rico
- Coordinates: 18°03′00″N 67°06′04″W
- Commonwealth: Puerto Rico
- Municipality: Lajas

Area
  - Total: 1.68 sq mi (4.4 km^{2})
  - Land: 1.68 sq mi (4.4 km^{2})
  - Water: 0 sq mi (0 km^{2})
- Elevation: 312 ft (95 m)

Population (2010)
  - Total: 968
  - Density: 576.2/sq mi (222.5/km^{2})
- Source: 2010 Census
- Time zone: UTC−4 (AST)

París is a barrio in the municipality of Lajas, Puerto Rico. Its population in 2010 was 968.

== History ==
París was in Spain's gazetteers until Puerto Rico was ceded by Spain in the aftermath of the Spanish–American War under the terms of the Treaty of Paris of 1898 and became an unincorporated territory of the United States. In 1899, the United States Department of War conducted a census of Puerto Rico finding that the population of París barrio was 875.

Historical population
Census	Pop.	Note	%±
1900	875		—
1910	894		2.2%
1920	977		9.3%
1930	1,011		3.5%
1940	923		−8.7%
1950	822		−10.9%
1960	666		−19.0%
1970	613		−8.0%
1980	751		22.5%
1990	835		11.2%
2000	878		5.1%
2010	968		10.3%
U.S. Decennial Census; 1899 (shown as 1900) 1910-1930; 1930-1950 1980-2000 2010

== See also ==
- List of communities in Puerto Rico
