= Lajas Valley =

Anticlinal valley in Puerto Rico

- Yauco-Boquerón Valley
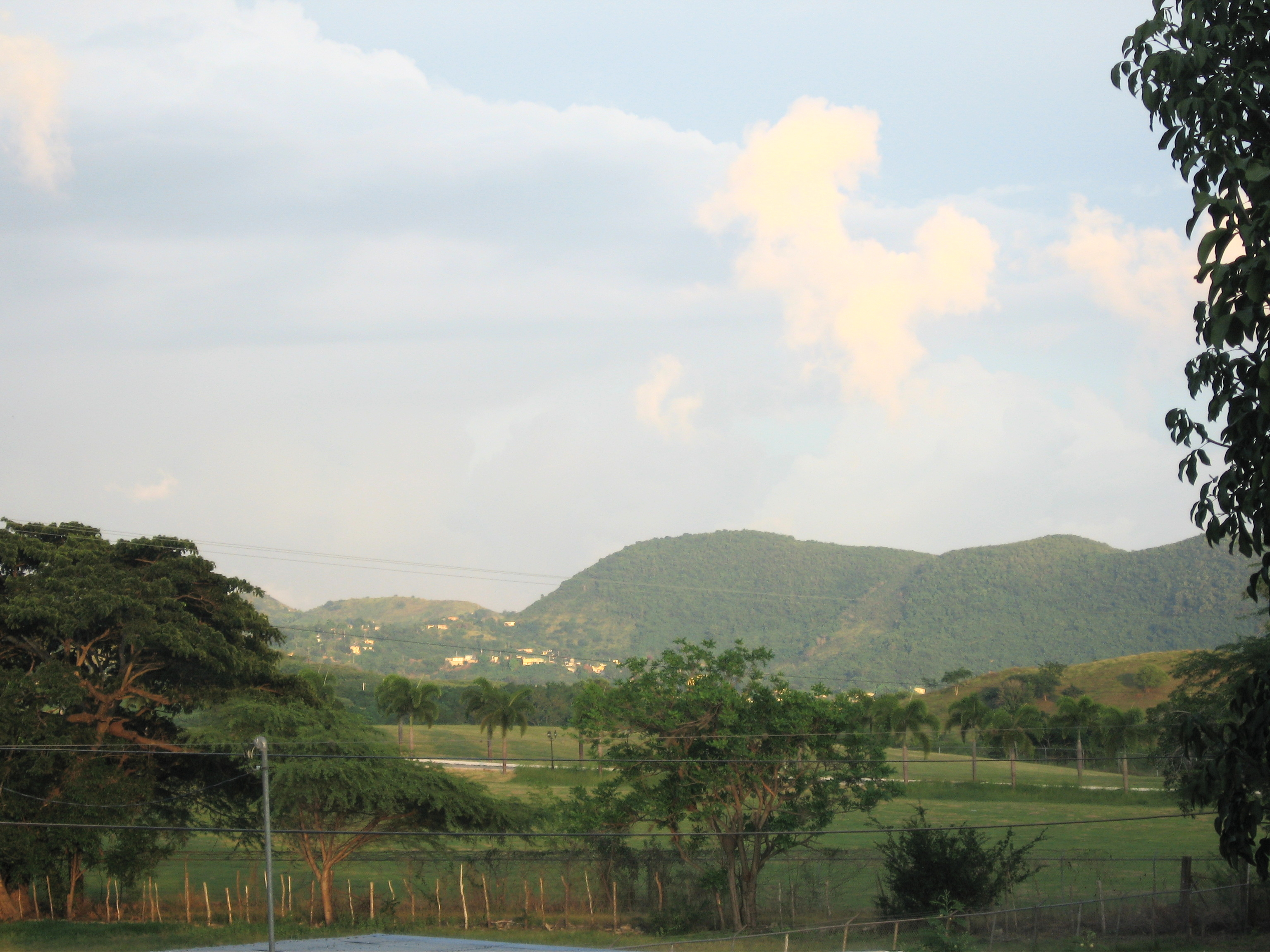
- Lajas Valley from Rayo, Sabana Grande

- Location within Puerto Rico
- Length: 30 km (19 mi) East-west
- Width: 5 km (3.1 mi)

Geology
- Type: Anticlinal valley

Geography
- Coordinates: 18°0′53″N 67°3′59″W
- Interactive map of Lajas Valley

The Lajas Valley (Spanish: Valle de Lajas), or the Yauco-Boquerón Valley (Valle de Yauco-Boquerón), is an anticlinal valley that runs 30 km (19 mi) long and 5 km (3 mi) wide east-to-west in southwestern Puerto Rico, within the municipalities of Lajas, Cabo Rojo, Guánica, and Sabana Grande. It is surrounded by the Cordillera Central and the Santa Marta hills to the north, the Sierra Bermeja (a small range in Lajas and Cabo Rojo) to the south, the Boqueron Bay in Cabo Rojo to the west, and the Guánica Bay and southern karst to the east. The climate is considered moist to dry subhumid tropical. Its large extension and fertile soil have made it a good place for agriculture. However, it is one of the driest places of Puerto Rico, making irrigation necessary.

A Tethered Aerostat Radar System aerostat is located at the Lajas Valley.

Seismological research in 2005 determined there is an ancient fault, the South Lajas Valley Fault (SLVF), in the vicinity.

== Gallery ==
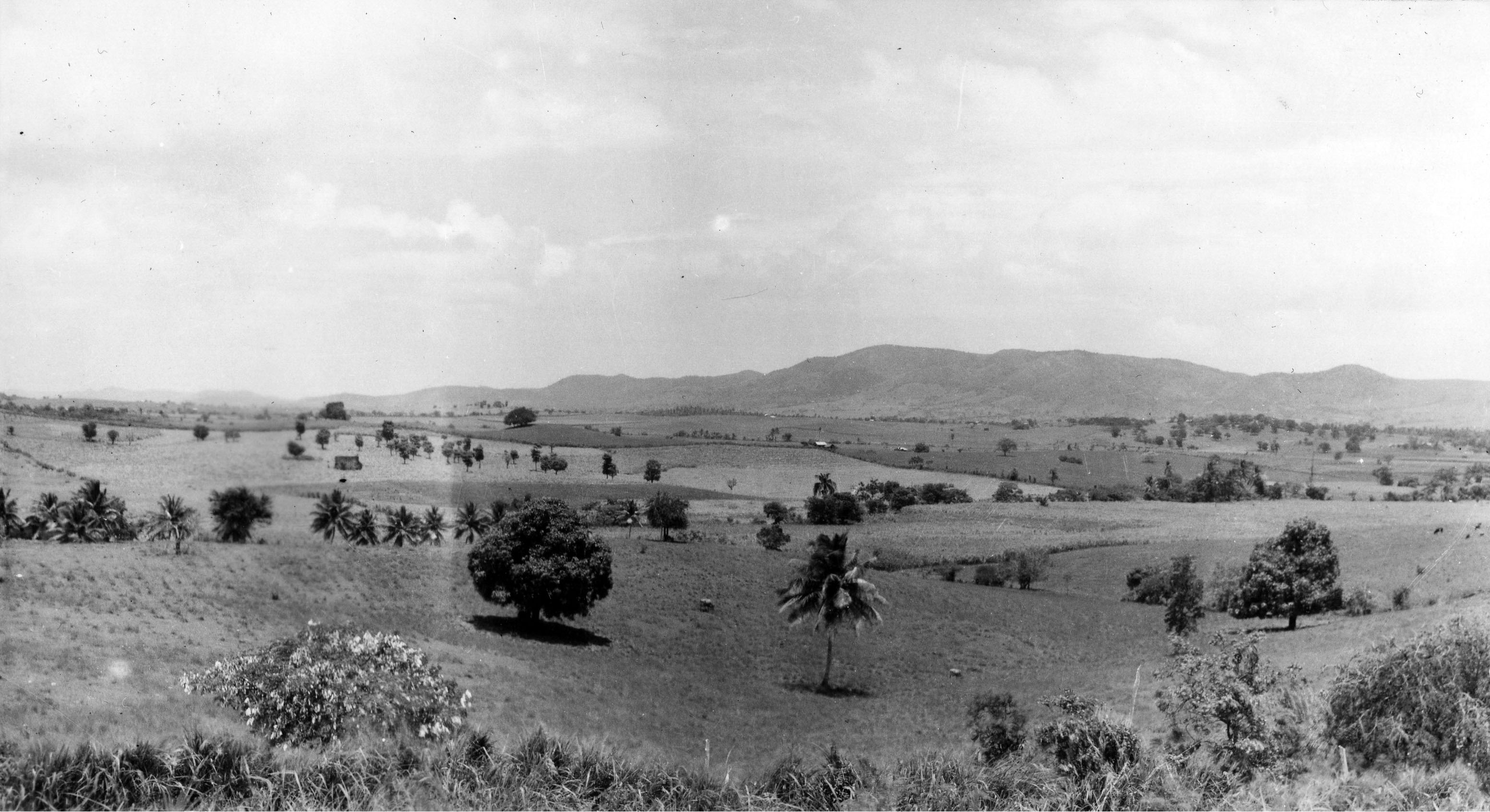
Lajas Valley, Sierra Bermeja in the background. 1935

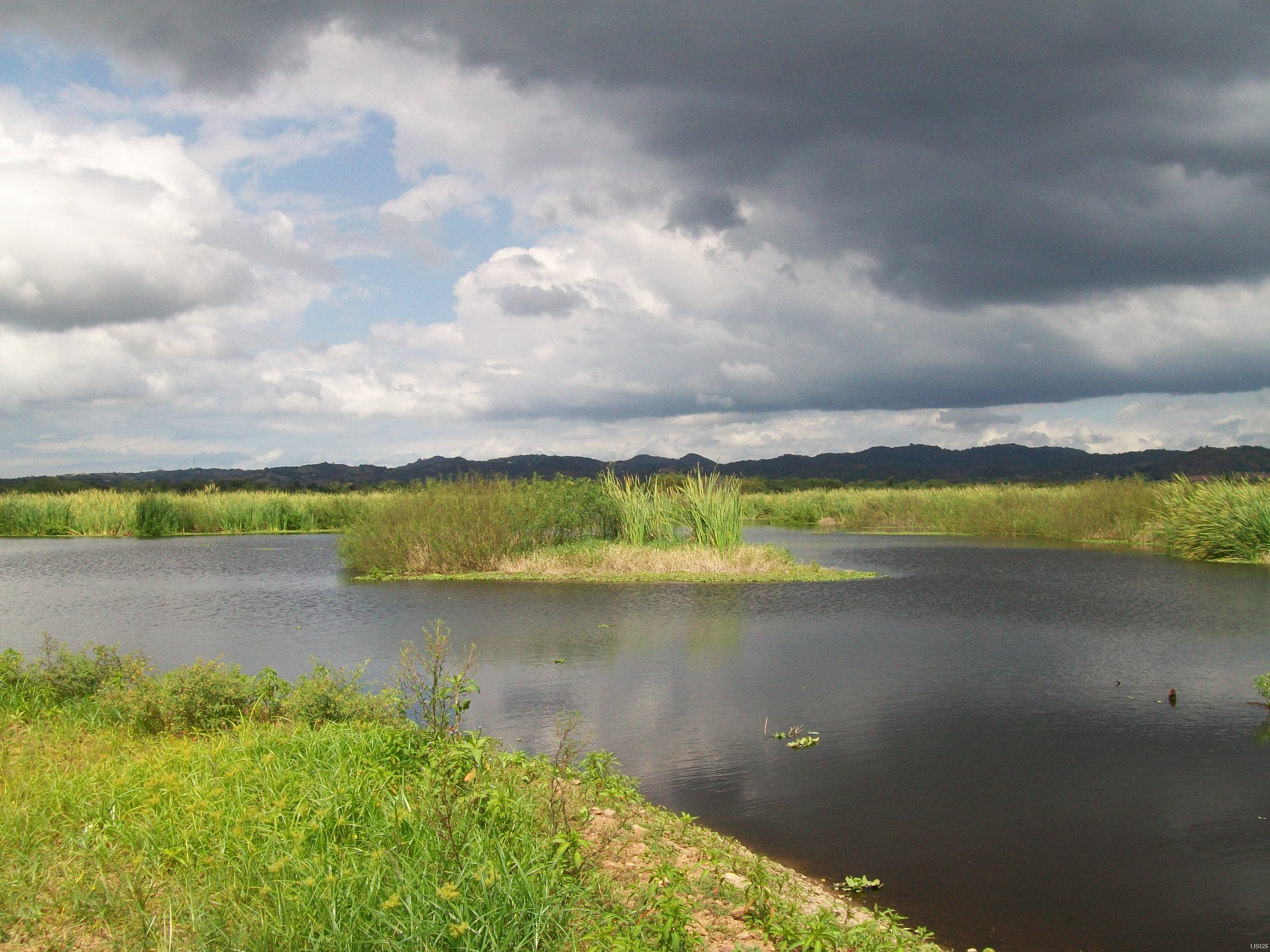
Laguna Cartagena, west Lajas Valley.

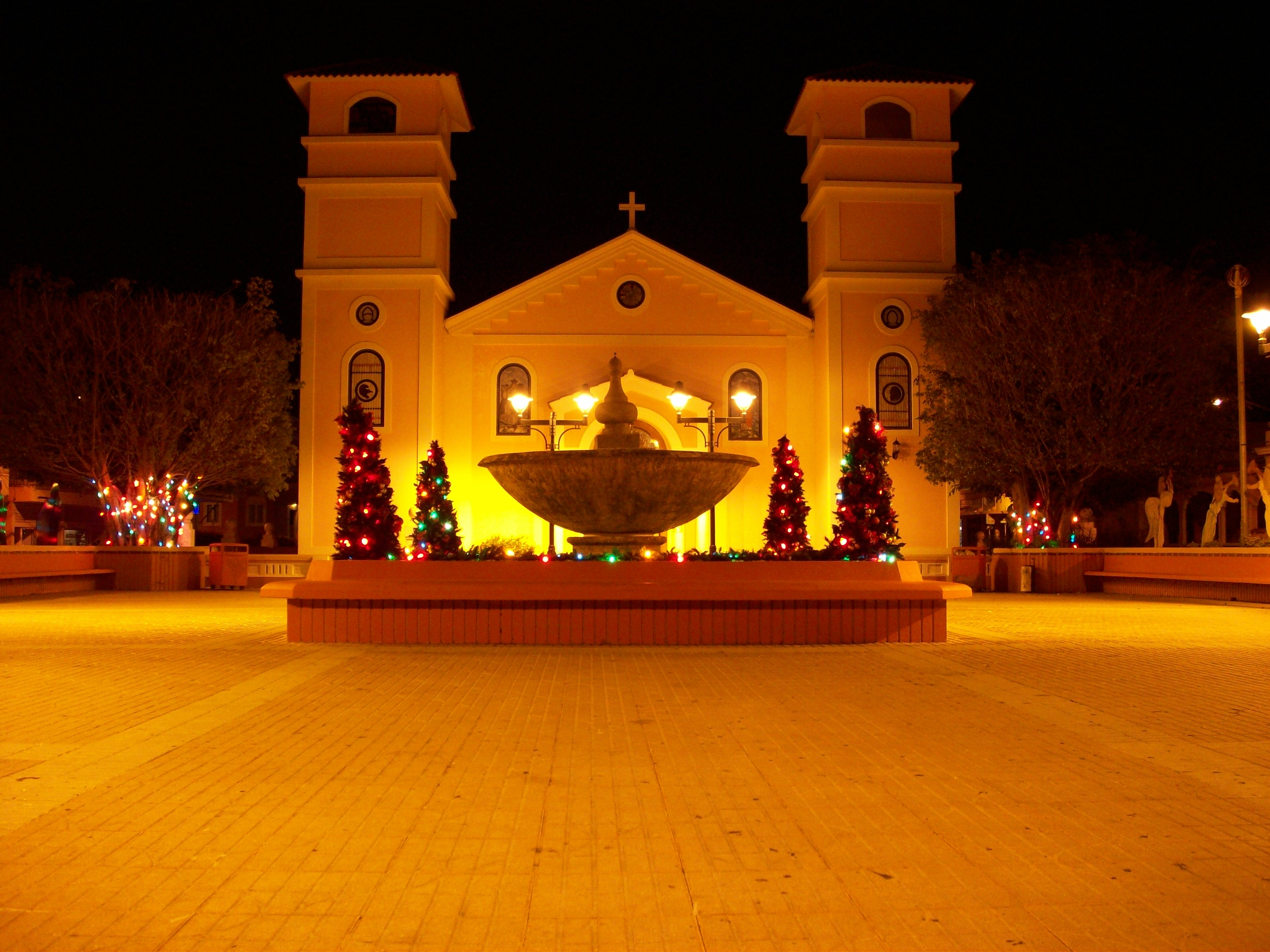
The town of Lajas is located near the north center of the valley.
