= El Llano =

El Llano may refer to:

- El Llano, Aguascalientes, Mexico
- El Llano, Panama
- El Llano, Dominican Republic
- El Llano, Arizona, United States

== See also ==
- Llano (disambiguation)
