= Liaño =

Liaño may refer to:

== People ==
- David Liaño Gonzalez (born 1979), Spanish mountaineer
- Felipe de Liaño (died 1625), Spanish painter
- Francisco Liaño (born 1964), Spanish footballer
- Thomas Vásquez de Liaño (1546-1599), Roman Catholic prelate

== Places ==
- Liaño, locality in the municipality of Villaescusa in Cantabria, Spain

== See also ==
- Liano (disambiguation)
- Lianos (disambiguation)
