= Candelaria, Lajas, Puerto Rico =

Barrio of Puerto Rico

Candelaria
- Barrio
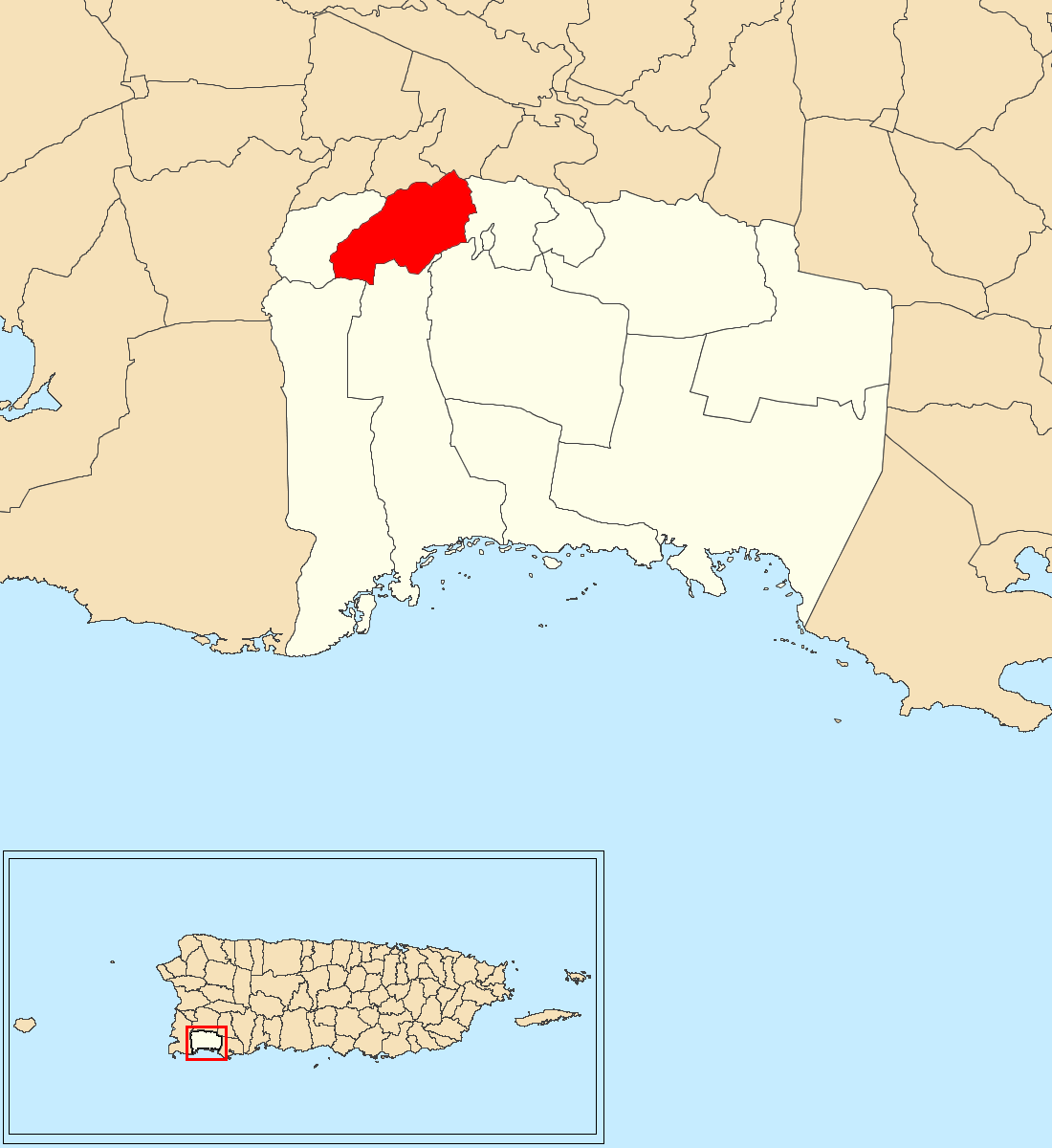
- Location of Candelaria within the municipality of Lajas shown in red

- Location of Puerto Rico
- Coordinates: 18°03′10″N 67°04′39″W
- Commonwealth: Puerto Rico
- Municipality: Lajas

Area
  - Total: 2.46 sq mi (6.4 km^{2})
  - Land: 2.46 sq mi (6.4 km^{2})
  - Water: 0 sq mi (0 km^{2})
- Elevation: 194 ft (59 m)

Population (2010)
  - Total: 3,599
  - Density: 1,463/sq mi (565/km^{2})
- Source: 2010 Census
- Time zone: UTC−4 (AST)

Candelaria is a barrio in the municipality of Lajas, Puerto Rico. Its population in 2010 was 3,599.

== History ==
Candelaria was in Spain's gazetteers until Puerto Rico was ceded by Spain in the aftermath of the Spanish–American War under the terms of the Treaty of Paris of 1898 and became an unincorporated territory of the United States. In 1899, the United States Department of War conducted a census of Puerto Rico finding that the population of Candelaria barrio was 1,008.

Historical population
Census	Pop.	Note	%±
1900	1,008		—
1910	1,277		26.7%
1920	1,227		−3.9%
1930	1,242		1.2%
1940	1,872		50.7%
1950	2,238		19.6%
1960	1,861		−16.8%
1970	0		−100.0%
1980	2,205		—
1990	2,888		31.0%
2000	3,683		27.5%
2010	3,599		−2.3%
U.S. Decennial Census; 1899 (shown as 1900) 1910-1930; 1930-1950 1980-2000 2010

== See also ==
- List of communities in Puerto Rico
