= Sierra Bermeja =

Mountain range in Puerto Rico

Coordinates: 17°59′54″N 67°06′38″W

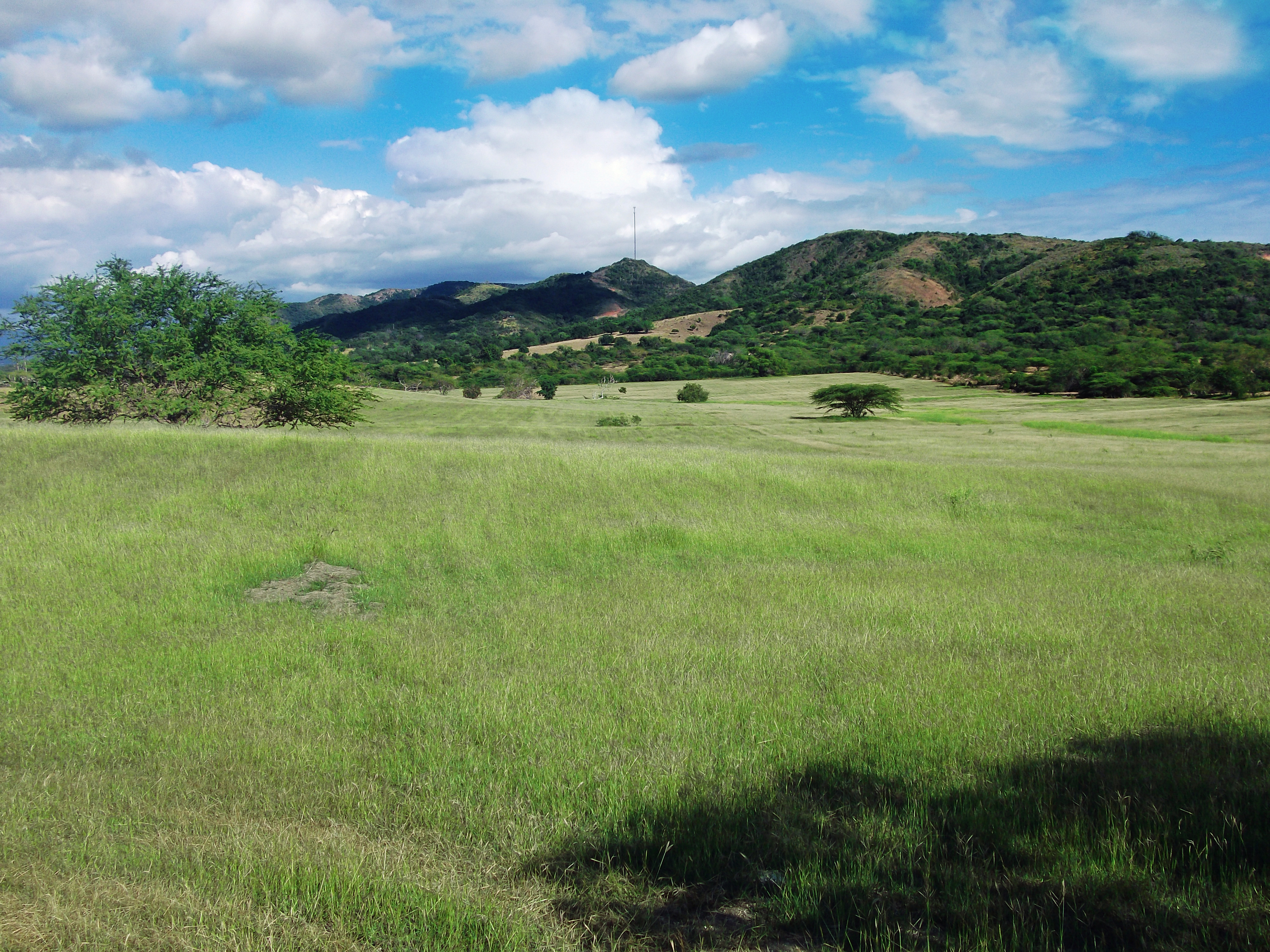
- Sierra Bermeja

Highest point
- Peak: Cerro Mariquita
- Elevation: 908 ft (277 m)

Naming
- Etymology: Spanish for vermilion mountain range

Geography
- Location: Cabo Rojo and Lajas, Puerto Rico

Sierra Bermeja is a mountain range in southwestern Puerto Rico. It forms the southern boundary of the Lajas Valley and it is bordered by La Parguera in the Caribbean Sea coast. It extends from the municipality of Cabo Rojo in the west to Lajas in the east. It consists of a combination of volcanic rocks, completely crossed by serpentinite and amphibolite faults, which could well be the oldest known rock in Puerto Rico. The mountains were used by the Taíno people as refuge from the Spanish, and then by smugglers during the Spanish colonization.

The Sierra Bermeja is the nesting place of many species that feed in the Laguna Cartagena. These hills are among a few forested areas of the southwestern coastal plain, characterized by its aridity. As a result, the Sierra provides the requirements for a large quantity of wildlife established in the area, many of it endangered.

In 2015, volunteers searched the area for a meteorite that, according to NASA, may have landed in Sierra Bermeja. Development in the region had become a threat to the area, despite being one of the most important natural areas in Puerto Rico. In June 2018, funds were earmarked for universities in Puerto Rico to use for research of the Sierra Bermeja region. Local folklore surrounding the area says there is a secret UFO base somewhere in the Sierra Bermeja.

Conservation efforts have been ongoing, spearheaded by the US Fish and Wildlife and landowners. The highest point of this range is located on Cerro Mariquita within the municipality of Cabo Rojo.

== Gallery ==
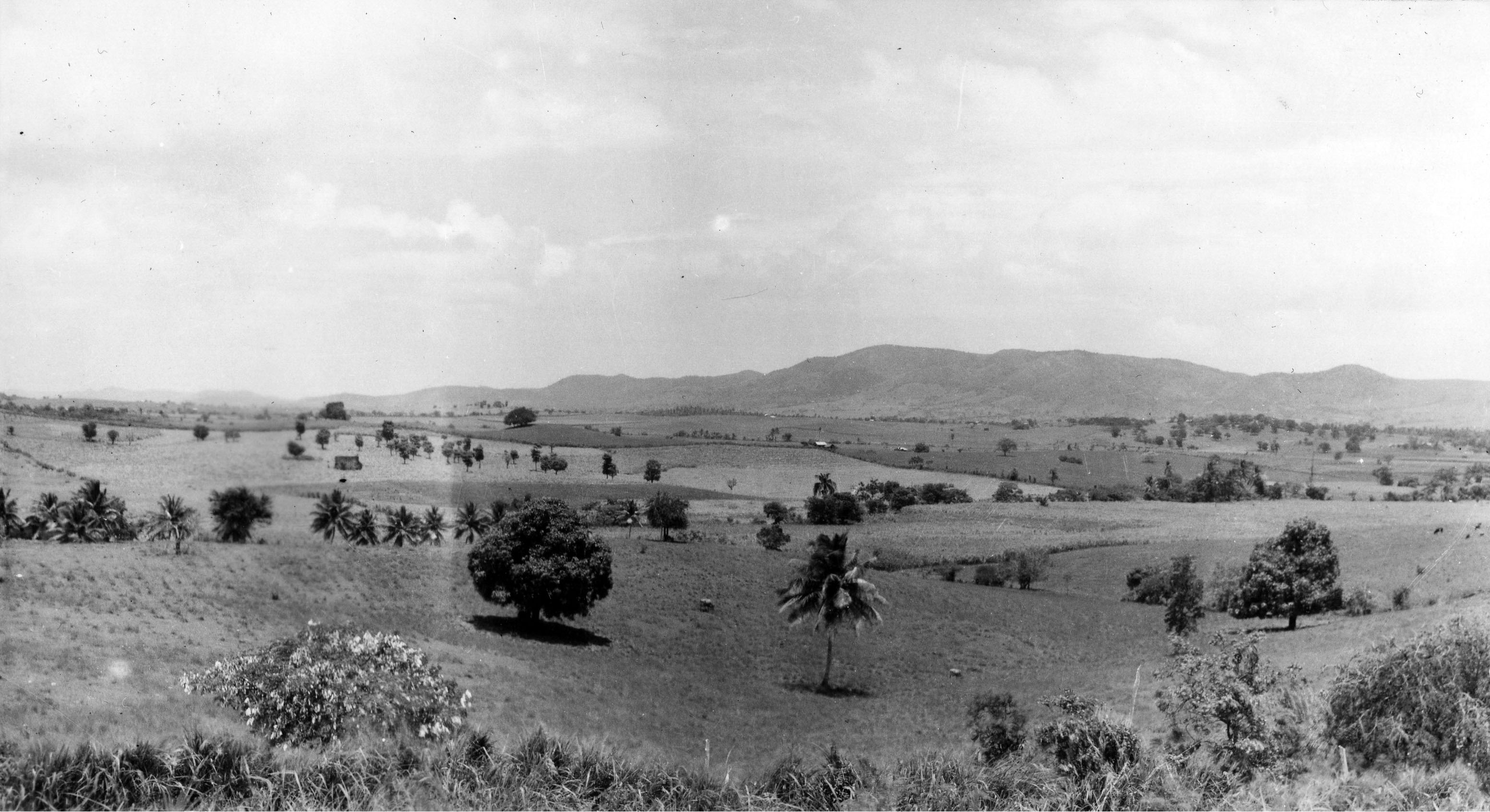
Sierra Bermeja mountain range, 1935
