= Lianos =

Lianos may refer to:

- Elias Lianos, Greek businessman
- Gandini Lianos, horse

== See also ==
- Liano (disambiguation)
- Liaño (disambiguation)
