= Isla Mata la Gata =

Uninhabited island in Puerto Rico

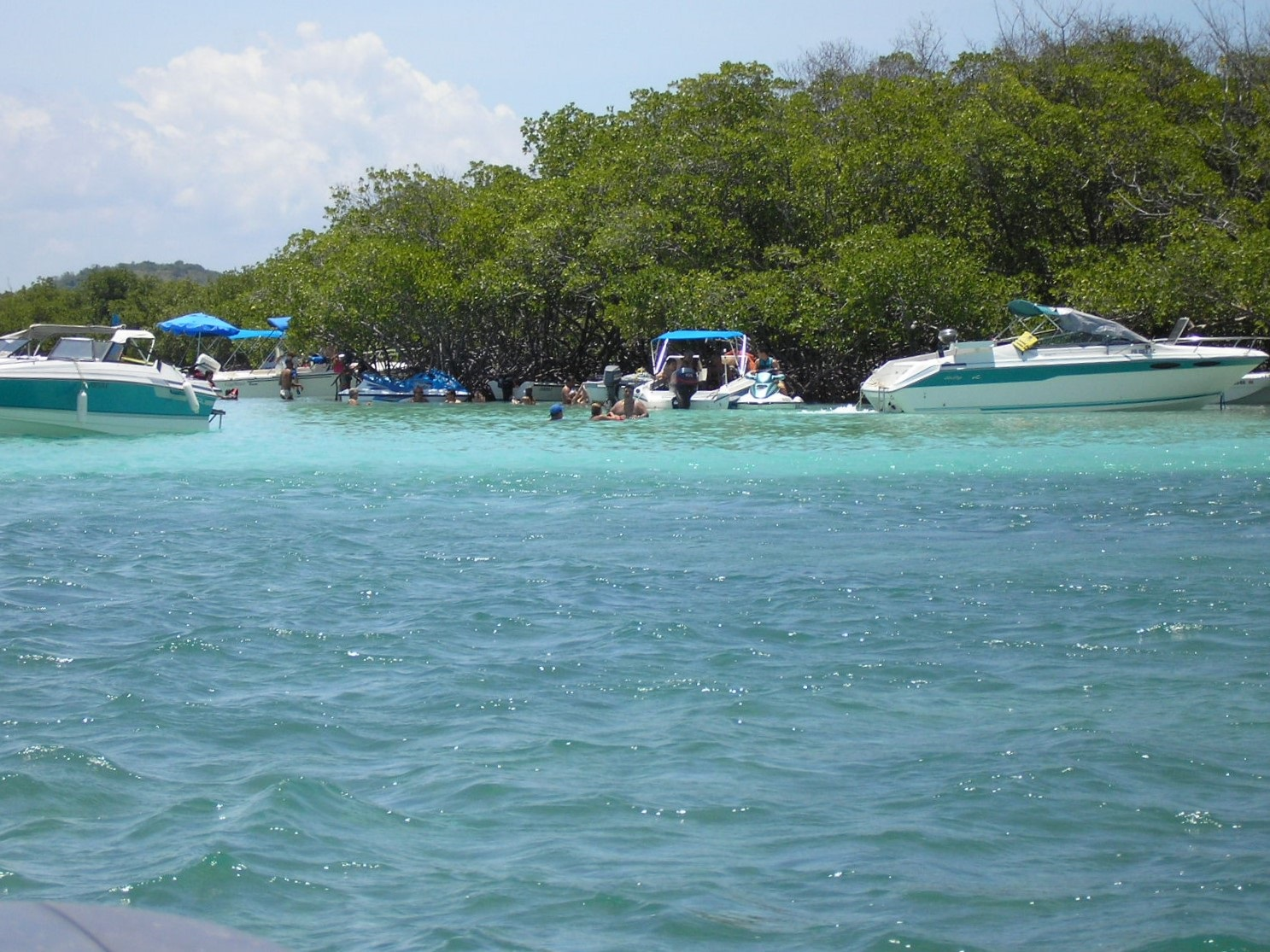
- Beach and boats at Isla Mata la Gata

- Location within Puerto Rico Location within Lesser Antilles Location within the Caribbean

Geography
- Location: Caribbean Sea
- Coordinates: 17°57′36.0″N 67°02′17.7″W
- Archipelago: Puerto Rico Archipelago

Administration
- Puerto Rico
- Commonwealth: Puerto Rico

Isla Mata la Gata is a mangrove island and tourist attraction, located off the southwest coast of Puerto Rico. Closest access from the island is by boat from the coastal village of La Parguera, in Lajas. Available facilities include dock, picnic tables, open air shelters, changing cabanas and commodes. Activities include sunbathing, swimming, snorkelling, picnicking, fishing.
