= Llanos (disambiguation) =

Llanos is a savanna and grassland region in Colombia and Venezuela.

Llanos, Spanish for 'plains', may also refer to:

== Places ==
- Llanos de Moxos or Beni savanna, a seasonally flooded savanna in Bolivia
- Los Llanos de Aridane, a municipality on the Canary Islands
- Los Llanos, Chile, a region in southern Chile
- Llanos el Salado, a wetland basin in northern Mexico
- Los Llanos, Herrera, a corregimiento in Panama
- Llanos (Lena), a parish of Lena, Asturias, Spain
- Llanos de Albacete, a comarca in Spain
- Llanos, Aibonito, Puerto Rico, US
- Los Llanos, Coamo, Puerto Rico, US
- Llanos, Lajas, Puerto Rico, US
- Venezuelan Llanos, a region of Venezuela

== Other uses ==
- Los Llanos Airport or Albacete Airport, an airport in Spain
