= Llano =

Llano, the Spanish word for plain, may refer to:

== Places ==
- Llano, California, an unincorporated community in California, United States
- Llano Estacado, a region in northwest Texas and eastern New Mexico
- Llano, New Mexico, a settlement in the Las Trampas Land Grant
- Llano, Texas, a small city in Llano County, Texas
- Llano County, Texas
- Llano River, a Texas river
- Llano Uplift, a geologic dome exposing Precambrian rocks in Central Texas
- Llanos, a plain in northwestern South America
  - Llanero, a person from the Llanos

== People ==
- Gonzalo Queipo de Llano (1875–1951), Spanish army officer during the Spanish Civil War
- Sandra Llano-Mejía (born 1951), Colombian multimedia artist

== Other uses ==
- The Llano, a magical song in Piers Anthony's Incarnations of Immortality novel Being a Green Mother
- The codename for the first AMD Accelerated Processing Unit microprocessor

== See also ==
- Llanito, a form of Andalusian Spanish spoken in Gibraltar
- Llanite, a variety of rhyolite found in Llano County, Texas
- El Llano (disambiguation)
- Llanos (disambiguation)
