= Henry LaFont =

Puerto Rican actor, comedian, lawyer and businessman (died 2023)

- Died: February 15, 2023
- Occupations: Television comedian, lawyer, businessman, tourism official

Julio Enrique Pancorbo Ortiz (died February 15, 2023), better known as Henry LaFont, was a Puerto Rican lawyer, businessman, television comedian and tourism official.

Pancorbo Ortiz was best known for his participation in a canal 4 television show named "Showtime" as part of a comedic duo named "Henry LaFont y El Casanova" ("Henry LaFont and the Casanova"). "Showtime" was televised for many years on canal 4.

Pancorbo Ortiz was also a lawyer, practicing in Lajas, Puerto Rico.

Pancorbo Ortiz was also the creator of Parador La Parguera, a tourist attraction in his hometown of Lajas, Puerto Rico. He co-founded the Empresas de Turismo Interno de Puerto Rico, a company that aimed at increasing domestic tourism among Puerto Rico residents.

== See also ==
- List of Puerto Ricans
