= Laguna Cartagena National Wildlife Refuge =

Refuge in Lajas, Puerto Rico

- IUCN category IV (habitat/species management area)
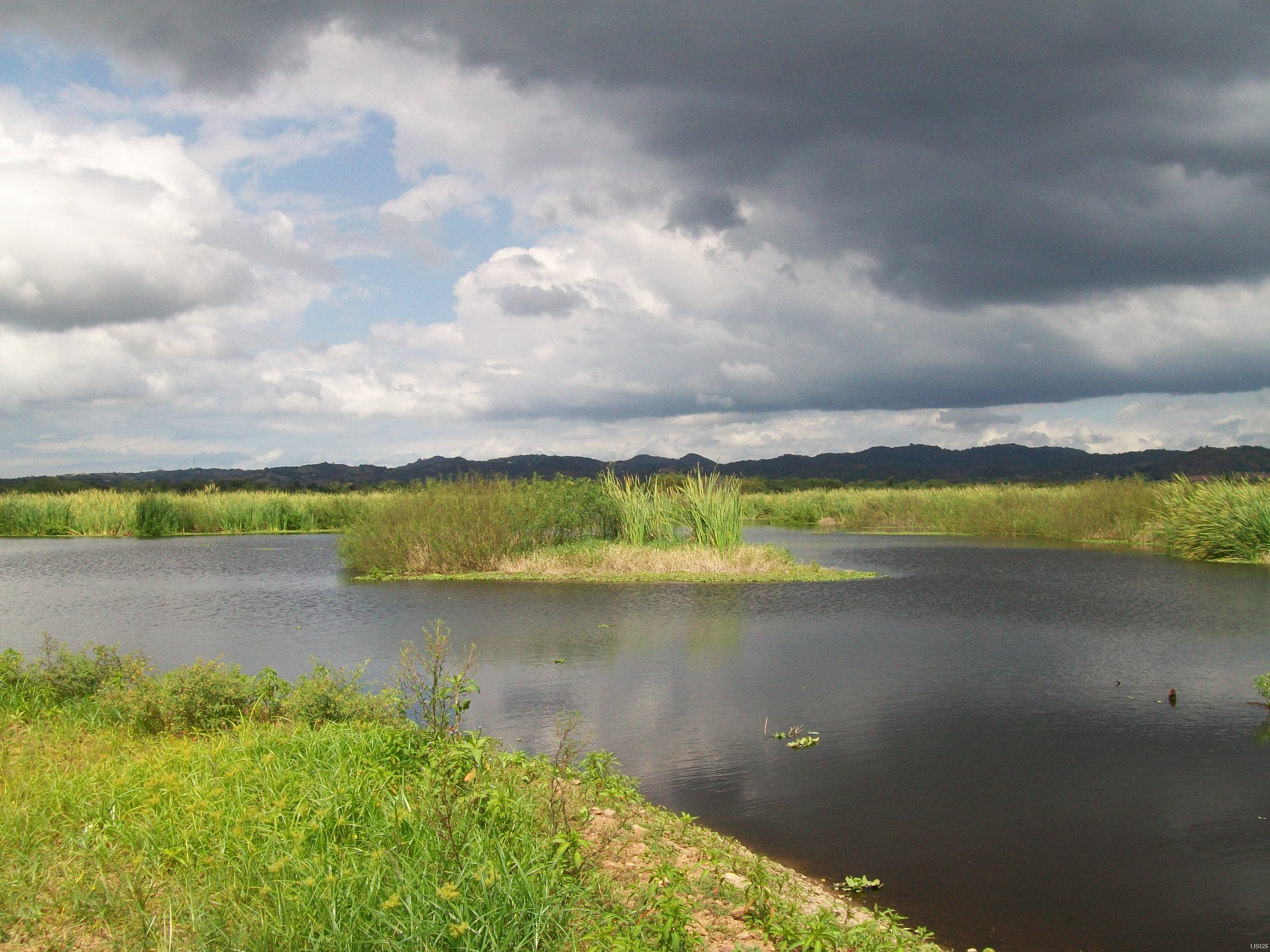
- Laguna Cartagena National Wildlife Refuge

- Location within Puerto Rico
- Location: Lajas, Puerto Rico, Caribbean
- Coordinates: 18°00′50″N 67°06′04″W
- Area: 1,059 acres (4.29 km^{2})
- Established: 1989
- Governing body: U.S. Fish and Wildlife Service
- Website: Laguna Cartagena National Wildlife Refuge

The Laguna Cartagena National Wildlife Refuge (Spanish: Refugio de Vida Silvestre de Laguna Cartagena) is a 1043-acre National Wildlife Refuge in Lajas, Puerto Rico. It is part of the Caribbean Islands National Wildlife Refuge Complex.

The present lagoon is a remnant of what was once an open expanse of water. Historically, the lagoon was one of the most important freshwater habitats for migrating waterfowl and aquatic birds in Puerto Rico. Due to agricultural practices, about 90 percent of the lagoon is occluded by cattail. Intensive cattle grazing and sugar cane production have greatly altered the original landscape.

In addition to the lagoon, there are uplands containing pastureland and abandoned sugar cane fields. 263 acres (1.06 km^{2}) of foothills can also be found, belonging to the Sierra Bermeja. Said foothills are, geologically, the oldest in the Caribbean and protect native forest with multiple endemic plant species. The area is a stopover for neotropical migrants and several species of waterbirds. The endangered yellow-shouldered blackbird and peregrine falcon have been reported on the refuge.
