= Llanos, Lajas, Puerto Rico =

Barrio of Puerto Rico

Llanos
- Barrio
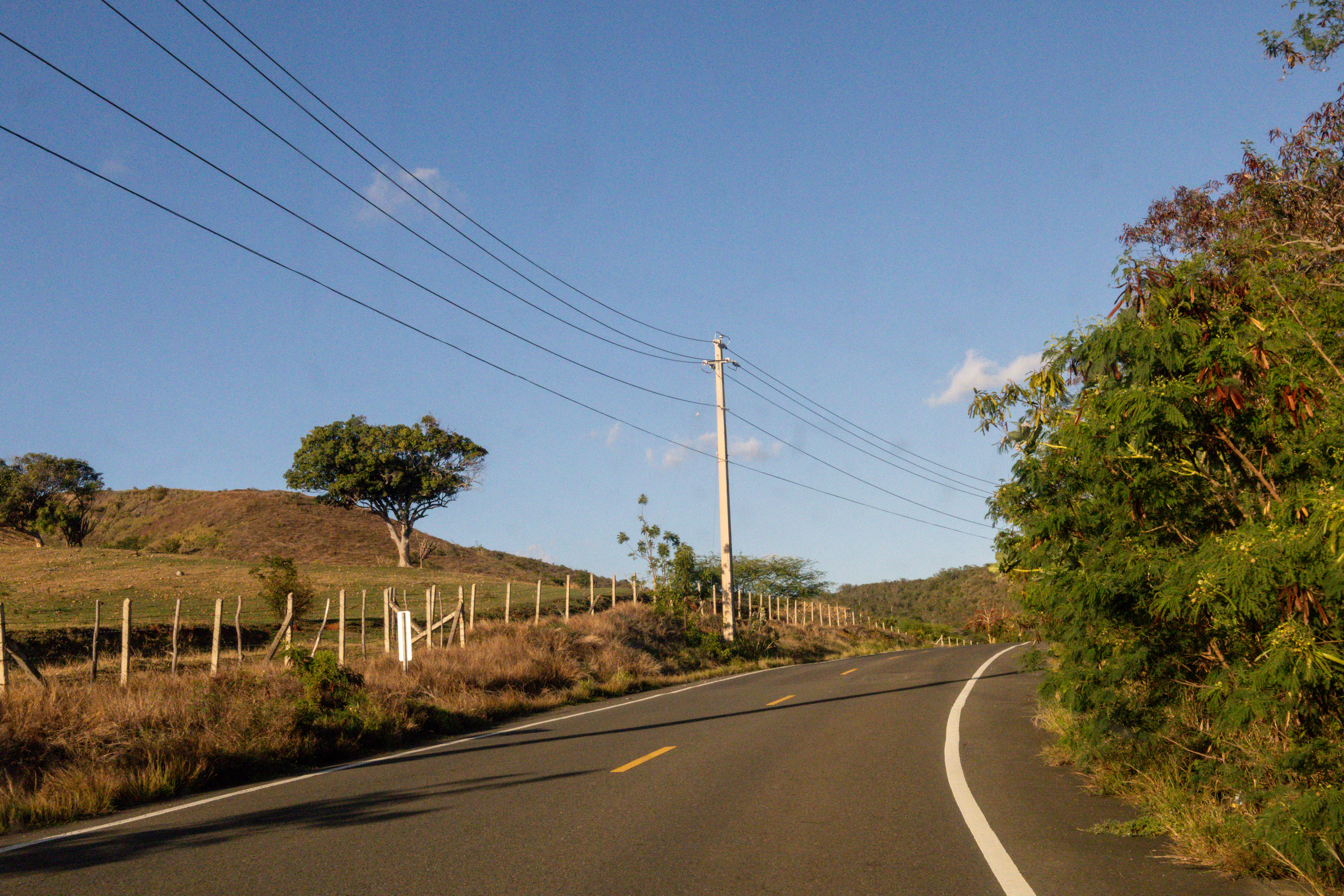
- Puerto Rico Highway 303 in Llanos

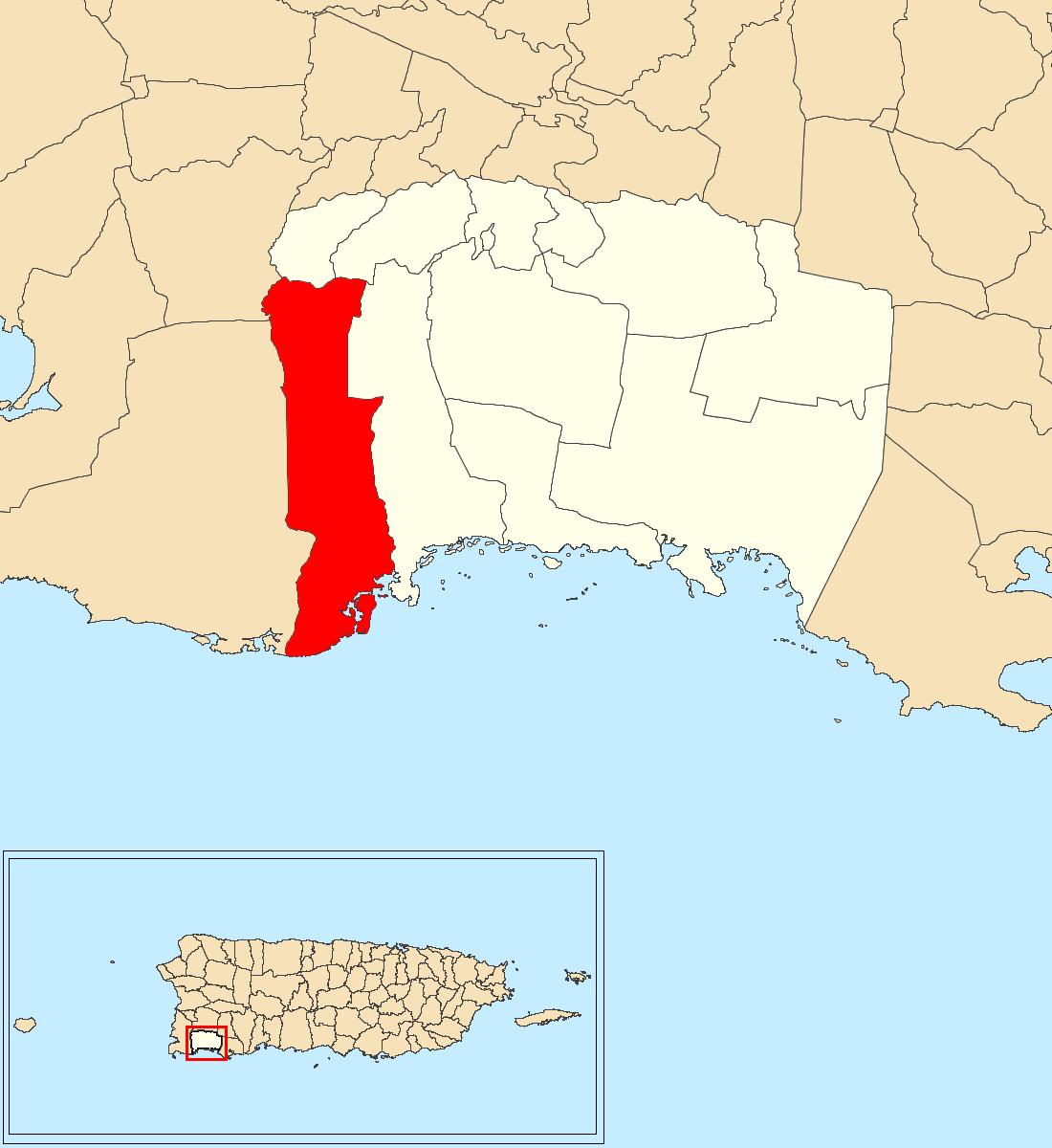
- Location of Llanos within the municipality of Lajas shown in red

- Location of Puerto Rico
- Coordinates: 17°59′56″N 67°05′48″W
- Commonwealth: Puerto Rico
- Municipality: Lajas

Area
  - Total: 9.04 sq mi (23.4 km^{2})
  - Land: 7.99 sq mi (20.7 km^{2})
  - Water: 1.05 sq mi (2.7 km^{2})
- Elevation: 285 ft (87 m)

Population (2010)
  - Total: 675
  - Density: 84.5/sq mi (32.6/km^{2})
- Source: 2010 Census
- Time zone: UTC−4 (AST)

Llanos is a barrio in the municipality of Lajas, Puerto Rico. Its population in 2010 was 675.

== History ==
Llanos was in Spain's gazetteers until Puerto Rico was ceded by Spain in the aftermath of the Spanish–American War under the terms of the Treaty of Paris of 1898 and became an unincorporated territory of the United States. In 1899, the United States Department of War conducted a census of Puerto Rico finding that the combined population of Palmarejo and Llanos barrios was 1,160.

Historical population
Census	Pop.	Note	%±
1910	660		—
1920	633		−4.1%
1930	492		−22.3%
1940	887		80.3%
1950	895		0.9%
1960	519		−42.0%
1970	427		−17.7%
1980	524		22.7%
1990	570		8.8%
2000	667		17.0%
2010	675		1.2%
U.S. Decennial Census; 1900 (N/A) 1910-1930; 1930-1950 1980-2000 2010

== See also ==
- List of communities in Puerto Rico
