= Lajas, Puerto Rico =

Town and municipality in Puerto Rico

Lajas Municipio de Lajas
- Town and Municipality
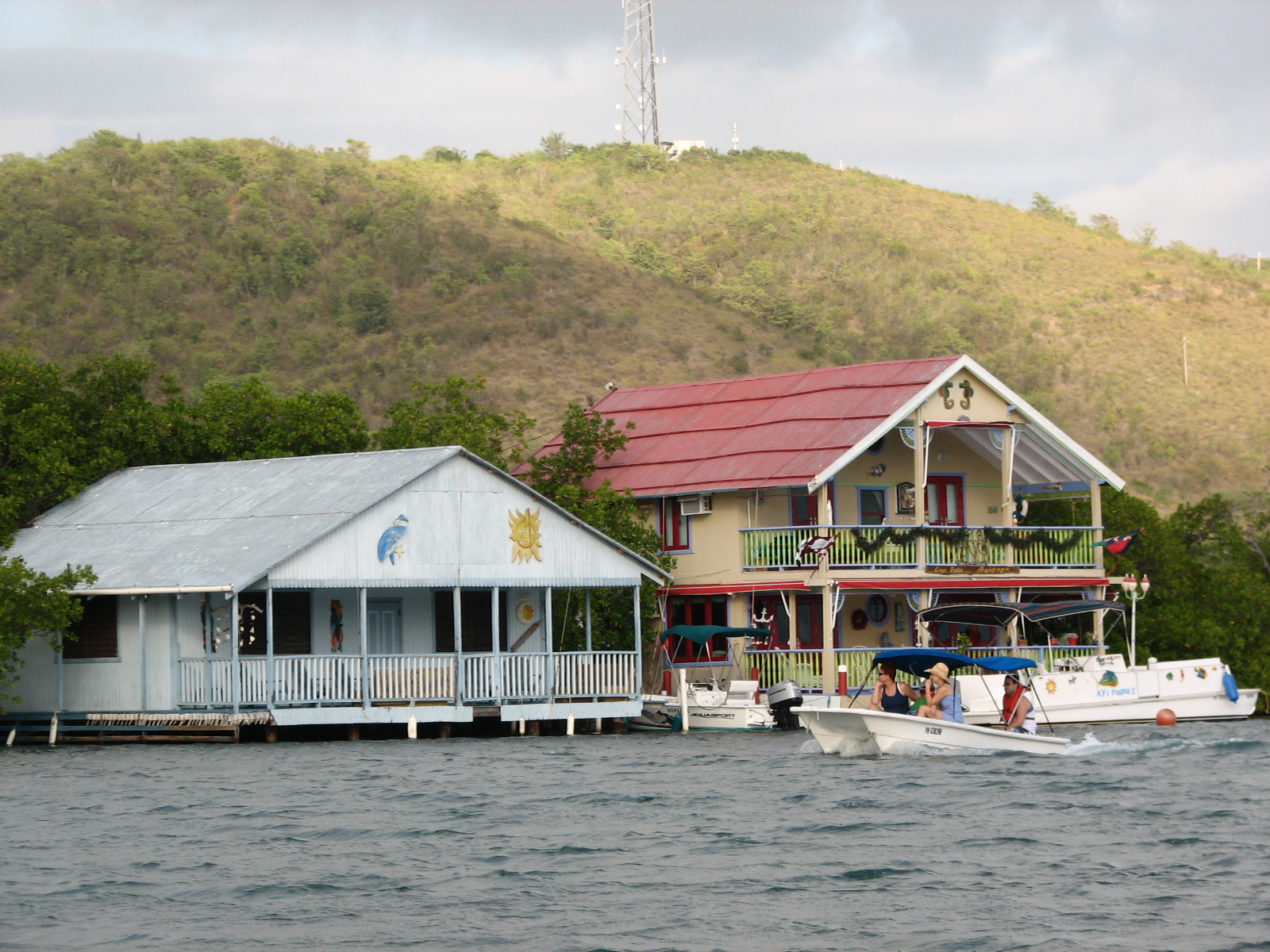
- Homes in Lajas

- Flag Coat of arms
- Nicknames: "La Ciudad Cardenalicia", "Los Tira Piedras"
- Anthem: "Nuestro Lajas, pueblito querido"
- Map of Puerto Rico highlighting Lajas Municipality
- Coordinates: 18°03′07″N 67°03′35″W
- Sovereign state: United States
- Commonwealth: Puerto Rico
- Settled: early 18th-century
- Founded: April 3, 1883
- Founder: Teodoro Jácome Pagán y Cancel and José Rodríguez y Rodríguez
- Barrios: 12 barrios: Candelaria; Costa; Lajas; Pueblo; Lajas Arriba; Llanos; Palmarejo; Parguera; París; Plata; Sabana Yeguas; Santa Rosa

Government
  - Mayor: Jayson Martínez (PNP)
  - Senatorial dist.: 5 - Ponce
  - Representative dist.: 21

Area
  - Total: 76.85 sq mi (199.04 km^{2})
  - Land: 61 sq mi (158 km^{2})
  - Water: 15.85 sq mi (41.04 km^{2})

Population (2020)
  - Total: 23,334
  - Estimate (2025): 22,784 ▼
  - Rank: 53rd in Puerto Rico
  - Density: 382/sq mi (148/km^{2})
- Demonym: Lajeños
- Time zone: UTC−4 (AST)
- ZIP Code: 00667
- Area code: 787/939

Lajas (Spanish pronunciation: [ˈlaxas], locally [ˈlahaʔ]) is a town and municipality located in the Lajas Valley in southwestern Puerto Rico, bordering the Caribbean Sea, south of San Germán and Sabana Grande; east of Cabo Rojo; and west of Guánica. Lajas is spread over 11 barrios plus Lajas Pueblo (the downtown area and the administrative center of the city). It is part of the San Germán-Cabo Rojo Metropolitan Statistical Area.

== History ==
Located in the Lajas Valley, the town was founded in 1883 by the Xueta Teodoro Jácome Pagán. Xuetes (Chuetas) were Mallorcan Jews (Sephardic Catalan Jews). Some families changed their names from Jácome to the Castilian form Santiago. Jácome is the Mallorquin form of James (Ia'akov). Catalan Jews from Mallorca were part of the early settlers in the south of Borikén (Puerto Rico).

Puerto Rico was ceded by Spain in the aftermath of the Spanish–American War under the terms of the Treaty of Paris of 1898 and became a colony of the United States. In 1899, the United States Department of War conducted a census of Puerto Rico finding that the population of Lajas was 8,789.

The village of La Parguera is a popular tourist destination to see the famous Bahía Fosforescente (Phosphorescent Bay) and its numerous keys and islets. Parador La Parguera was founded by Puerto Rican comedian Henry LaFont (Julio Pancorbo Ortiz).

People from the El Combate community in barrio Boquerón are known as mata con hacha ("those who kill with axes") based on folklore about a fight over the salinas, where those from Cabo Rojo fought with axes against people from the adjacent town of Lajas. Because the people from Lajas apparently fought back by throwing stones they are known as tira piedras ("those who throw stones").

On September 20, 2017 Hurricane Maria struck Puerto Rico. In Lajas, over 270 residences lost their roofs. The hurricane destroyed Lajas' pineapple industry.

== Geography ==
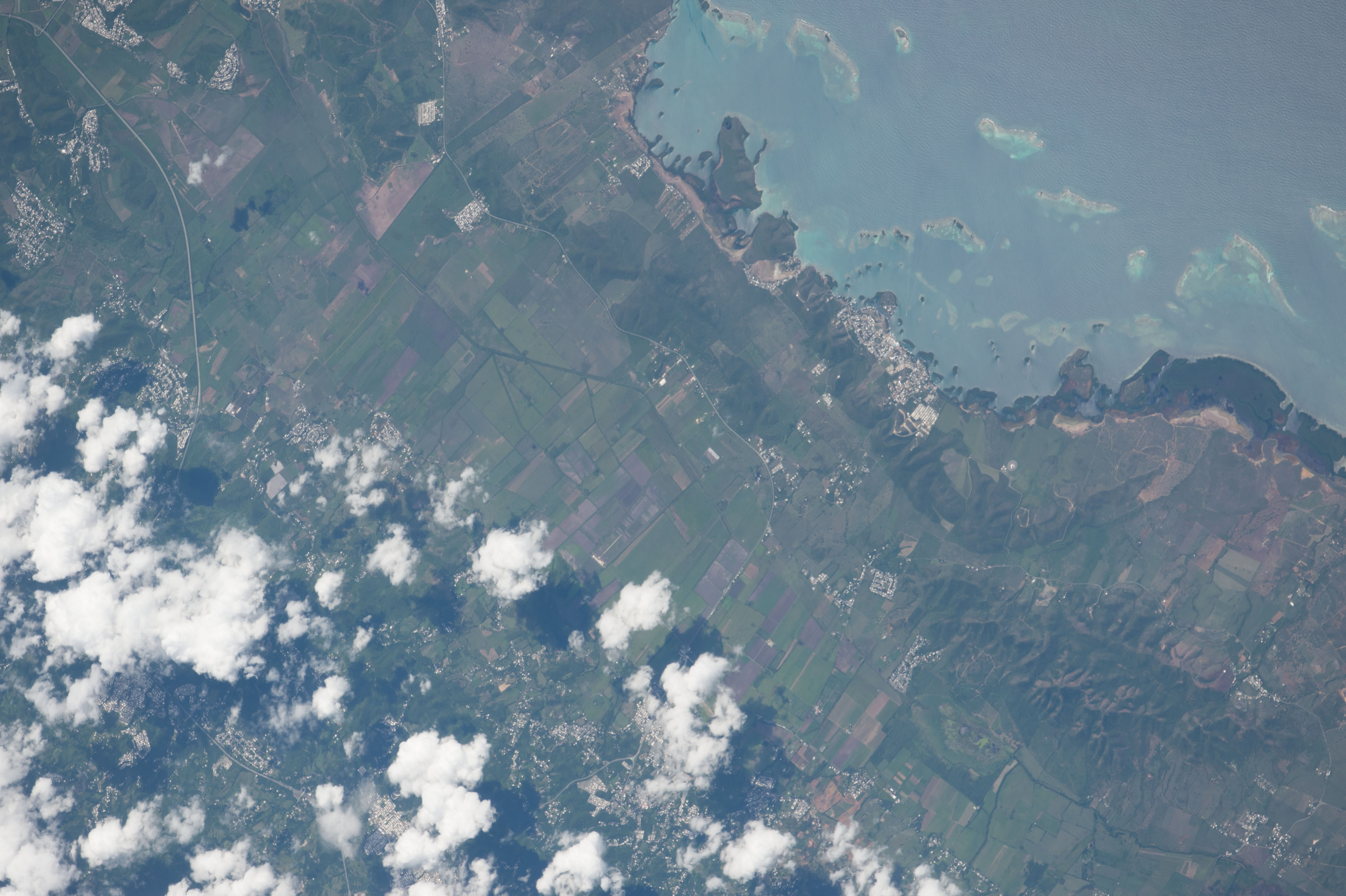
Picture of La Parguera, Lajas taken during ISS Expedition 53

Lajas is located on the southern coast. Laguna Cartagena National Wildlife Refuge is a national protected area located in Lajas.

=== Barrios ===
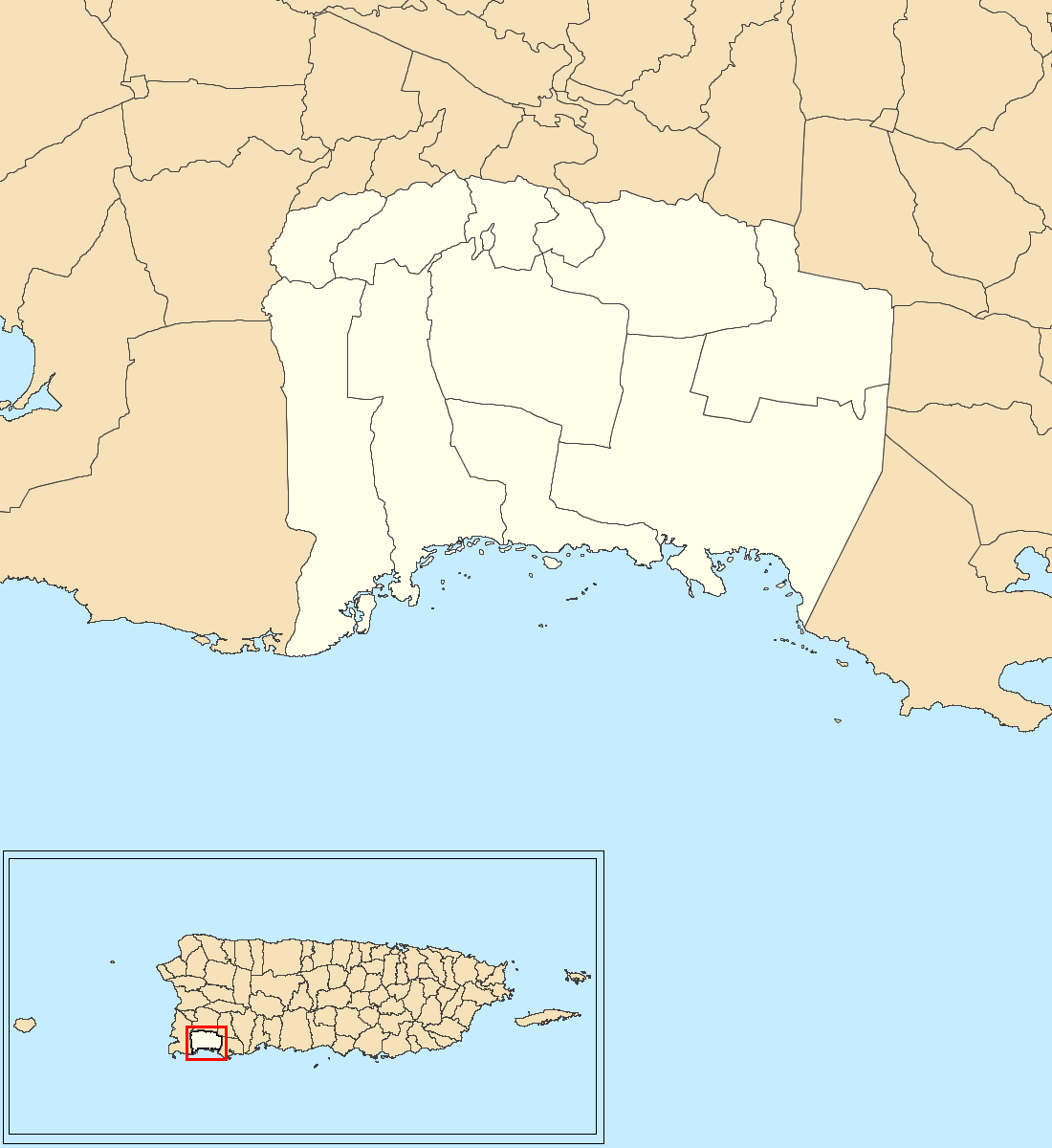
Subdivisions of Lajas

Like all municipalities of Puerto Rico, Lajas is subdivided into barrios. The municipal buildings, central square and large Catholic church are located in a small barrio referred to as "el pueblo".

1. Candelaria
2. Costa
3. Lajas
4. Lajas barrio-pueblo
5. Lajas Arriba
6. Llanos
7. Palmarejo
8. Parguera
9. París
10. Plata
11. Sabana Yeguas
12. Santa Rosa

=== Sectors ===
Barrios (which are, in contemporary times, roughly comparable to minor civil divisions) and subbarrios, are further subdivided into smaller areas called sectores (sectors in English). The types of sectores may vary, from normally sector to urbanización to reparto to barriada to residencial, among others.

=== Special Communities ===
Comunidades Especiales de Puerto Rico (Special Communities of Puerto Rico) are marginalized communities whose citizens are experiencing a certain amount of social exclusion. A map shows these communities occur in nearly every municipality of the commonwealth. Of the 742 places that were on the list in 2014, the following barrios, communities, sectors, or neighborhoods were in Lajas: El Papayo, El Tendal, Sector Sabana Yeguas, La Haya, Las Cuevas, Los Jovillos, Maguayo, Piñalejos, and Tokio.

=== Climate ===
Lajas features a tropical savanna climate (Aw/As), common for southwestern Puerto Rico. The record high for the town is 103 °F (39 °C).

Climate data for Lajas Substation, Puerto Rico (1991–2020 normals, extremes 1900, 1950–present)
Month	Jan	Feb	Mar	Apr	May	Jun	Jul	Aug	Sep	Oct	Nov	Dec	Year
Record high °F (°C)	96 (36)	94 (34)	95 (35)	95 (35)	95 (35)	99 (37)	103 (39)	99 (37)	98 (37)	97 (36)	98 (37)	98 (37)	103 (39)
Mean maximum °F (°C)	89.9 (32.2)	89.9 (32.2)	90.1 (32.3)	91.1 (32.8)	92.6 (33.7)	94.4 (34.7)	95.7 (35.4)	95.1 (35.1)	94.4 (34.7)	93.9 (34.4)	92.8 (33.8)	91.1 (32.8)	96.7 (35.9)
Mean daily maximum °F (°C)	87.2 (30.7)	87.2 (30.7)	87.4 (30.8)	88.4 (31.3)	89.6 (32.0)	91.3 (32.9)	92.3 (33.5)	91.8 (33.2)	91.3 (32.9)	90.8 (32.7)	89.3 (31.8)	88.2 (31.2)	89.6 (32.0)
Daily mean °F (°C)	74.7 (23.7)	74.6 (23.7)	75.4 (24.1)	77.0 (25.0)	79.2 (26.2)	80.7 (27.1)	81.1 (27.3)	81.0 (27.2)	80.7 (27.1)	80.3 (26.8)	78.3 (25.7)	75.8 (24.3)	78.2 (25.7)
Mean daily minimum °F (°C)	62.2 (16.8)	62.0 (16.7)	63.4 (17.4)	65.7 (18.7)	68.8 (20.4)	70.2 (21.2)	70.0 (21.1)	70.3 (21.3)	70.1 (21.2)	69.9 (21.1)	67.2 (19.6)	63.5 (17.5)	66.9 (19.4)
Mean minimum °F (°C)	55.1 (12.8)	56.4 (13.6)	57.7 (14.3)	59.4 (15.2)	63.0 (17.2)	64.7 (18.2)	65.1 (18.4)	65.0 (18.3)	63.7 (17.6)	63.3 (17.4)	60.4 (15.8)	56.5 (13.6)	53.2 (11.8)
Record low °F (°C)	44 (7)	51 (11)	50 (10)	50 (10)	56 (13)	55 (13)	53 (12)	58 (14)	59 (15)	56 (13)	50 (10)	49 (9)	44 (7)
Average precipitation inches (mm)	2.21 (56)	2.29 (58)	2.52 (64)	3.27 (83)	4.42 (112)	2.19 (56)	3.50 (89)	4.87 (124)	5.66 (144)	6.34 (161)	5.64 (143)	2.00 (51)	44.91 (1,141)
Average precipitation days (≥ 0.01 in)	8.4	6.5	7.6	10.0	10.1	6.0	8.5	11.5	12.9	14.0	12.4	7.6	115.5
Source: NOAA

Climate data for Parguera, Puerto Rico (1991–2020 normals, extremes 1959–present)
Month	Jan	Feb	Mar	Apr	May	Jun	Jul	Aug	Sep	Oct	Nov	Dec	Year
Record high °F (°C)	92 (33)	93 (34)	95 (35)	96 (36)	97 (36)	97 (36)	100 (38)	98 (37)	101 (38)	103 (39)	95 (35)	94 (34)	103 (39)
Mean maximum °F (°C)	88.6 (31.4)	88.5 (31.4)	89.2 (31.8)	90.1 (32.3)	90.0 (32.2)	92.3 (33.5)	92.7 (33.7)	94.0 (34.4)	94.4 (34.7)	92.5 (33.6)	91.5 (33.1)	90.5 (32.5)	96.8 (36.0)
Mean daily maximum °F (°C)	86.0 (30.0)	85.8 (29.9)	85.7 (29.8)	86.7 (30.4)	88.2 (31.2)	89.8 (32.1)	90.4 (32.4)	90.6 (32.6)	90.5 (32.5)	90.0 (32.2)	88.3 (31.3)	87.5 (30.8)	88.3 (31.3)
Daily mean °F (°C)	78.0 (25.6)	77.6 (25.3)	78.0 (25.6)	79.6 (26.4)	81.5 (27.5)	83.1 (28.4)	83.2 (28.4)	83.1 (28.4)	83.3 (28.5)	82.4 (28.0)	80.7 (27.1)	78.8 (26.0)	80.8 (27.1)
Mean daily minimum °F (°C)	70.0 (21.1)	69.4 (20.8)	70.3 (21.3)	72.4 (22.4)	74.8 (23.8)	76.3 (24.6)	75.9 (24.4)	75.6 (24.2)	76.1 (24.5)	74.9 (23.8)	73.0 (22.8)	70.0 (21.1)	73.2 (22.9)
Mean minimum °F (°C)	66.5 (19.2)	66.2 (19.0)	65.5 (18.6)	67.6 (19.8)	70.5 (21.4)	72.2 (22.3)	71.7 (22.1)	70.8 (21.6)	72.0 (22.2)	71.2 (21.8)	69.0 (20.6)	66.3 (19.1)	61.9 (16.6)
Record low °F (°C)	60 (16)	50 (10)	60 (16)	58 (14)	59 (15)	67 (19)	66 (19)	62 (17)	61 (16)	66 (19)	62 (17)	60 (16)	50 (10)
Average precipitation inches (mm)	1.93 (49)	1.86 (47)	2.71 (69)	3.57 (91)	4.07 (103)	2.54 (65)	2.67 (68)	4.32 (110)	5.53 (140)	6.26 (159)	5.06 (129)	1.96 (50)	42.48 (1,079)
Source: NOAA

== Demographics ==
Historical population
Census	Pop.	Note	%±
1900	8,789		—
1910	11,071		26.0%
1920	11,908		7.6%
1930	12,454		4.6%
1940	14,736		18.3%
1950	16,326		10.8%
1960	15,375		−5.8%
1970	16,545		7.6%
1980	21,236		28.4%
1990	23,271		9.6%
2000	26,261		12.8%
2010	25,753		−1.9%
2020	23,334		−9.4%
2025 (est.)	22,784	▼	−2.4%
U.S. Decennial Census; 1899 (shown as 1900) 1910-1930; 1930-1950 1960-2000 2010 2020

== Tourism ==
Lajas is famous for its main touristic attraction, Bahía Fosforescente (La Parguera), a place where bioluminescent dinoflagellates of different colors appear when the water moves. The origin of the colored lights is the object of many legends. Lajas is also a fishing town.

=== Landmarks and places of interest ===
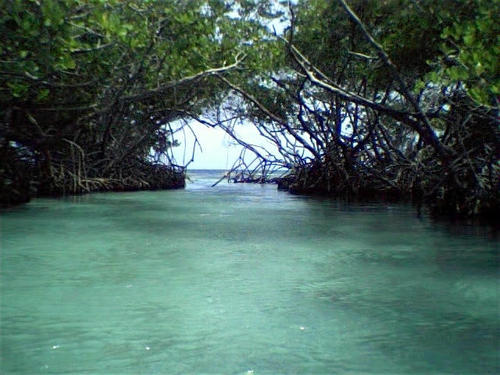
Caracoles, a mangrove island off La Parguera

There are five beaches in Lajas. Some of the main attractions of Lajas are:

- Cartagena Lagoon
- Indian Museum
- Old Train Station
- Old Silver Mines
- La Parguera
- Lajeño Soldier Monument
- Isla Magueyes
- Isla Mata la Gata
- Pineapple Processing Plant Ruins
- Rosada Beach or Playita Rosada
- Caracoles Beach
- Caribe Fisheries
- The Puerto Rico Alien Route, which passes by a landing strip developed by a local from Lajas to welcome extraterrestrial landings.

== Culture ==
=== Festivals and events ===
Lajas celebrates its patron saint festival in February. The Fiestas Patronales de Nuestra Señora de la Candelaria is a religious and cultural celebration that generally features parades, games, artisans, amusement rides, regional food, and live entertainment. The festival has featured live performances by well-known artists such as Tito Rojas, and Arcángel.

Other festivals and events celebrated in Lajas include:

- Kite Festival – February / March
- Festival de Pesca de la Aguja Azul – May
- Pineapple Festival (Festival de la Piña Paradisíaca) - May or June, where up to 50,000 people come for arts, crafts, music and 30,000 lbs. of pineapple
- Fiesta de San Pedro Festival – June
- Agriculture Fair or (Feria Agrícola Nacional del Valle de Lajas) – June / July
- Christmas Parade and Artisans Fair – December

== Government ==
Like all municipalities in Puerto Rico, Lajas is administered by a mayor. The current mayor is Jayson Martínez, from the New Progressive Party (PNP). Martínez was first elected at the 2020 general election.

The city belongs to the Puerto Rico Senatorial district V, which is represented by two Senators. In 2024, Marially González Huertas and Jamie Barlucea, from the Popular Democratic Party and New Progressive Party, respectively, were elected as District Senators.

== Transportation ==
There are 5 bridges in Lajas.

== Notable people ==
- Luis Aponte Martínez, Roman Catholic Cardinal of the Archdiocese of San Juan
- Robinson Cancel, Major League Baseball player
- Jacobo Morales, actor and film director
- Henry LaFont, Puerto Rican comedian and lawyer

== Symbols ==
Lajas municipio or Municipality has an official flag and coat of arms.

=== Flag ===
The flag consists of three horizontal stripes; the top one is green, the center one is white and the bottom one is light yellow. A vertical white stripe down the left makes a white cross. In the center of the cross is a ripe yellow pineapple. The cross is surrounded by eleven gold stars; five in the top part and six in the lower part of the cross, in the form of a circle.

=== Coat of arms ===
It is gold with a green band crossing it diagonally right to left; gold stands for the wealth of the land and green for the beauty of the valley, which is a gift from mother nature to Lajas. The band is adorned, at each end, with a pineapple bordered in gold and black. In the center of the band, also in gold, a marine shell. In the top left there is a red cardinal's hat and in the bottom a red anchor with green; the shield has a 3 tower castle, each one with two windows and a door. On the bottom, outside the shield, a banner with the inscription "Ciudad Cardenalicia" (Cardinal City). This, for Cardinal Luis Aponte Martínez, born in Lajas, who was the first and only Cardinal of the Catholic Church from Puerto Rico. The banner and the inscription appear in black.

== Gallery ==
Scenes around Lajas:

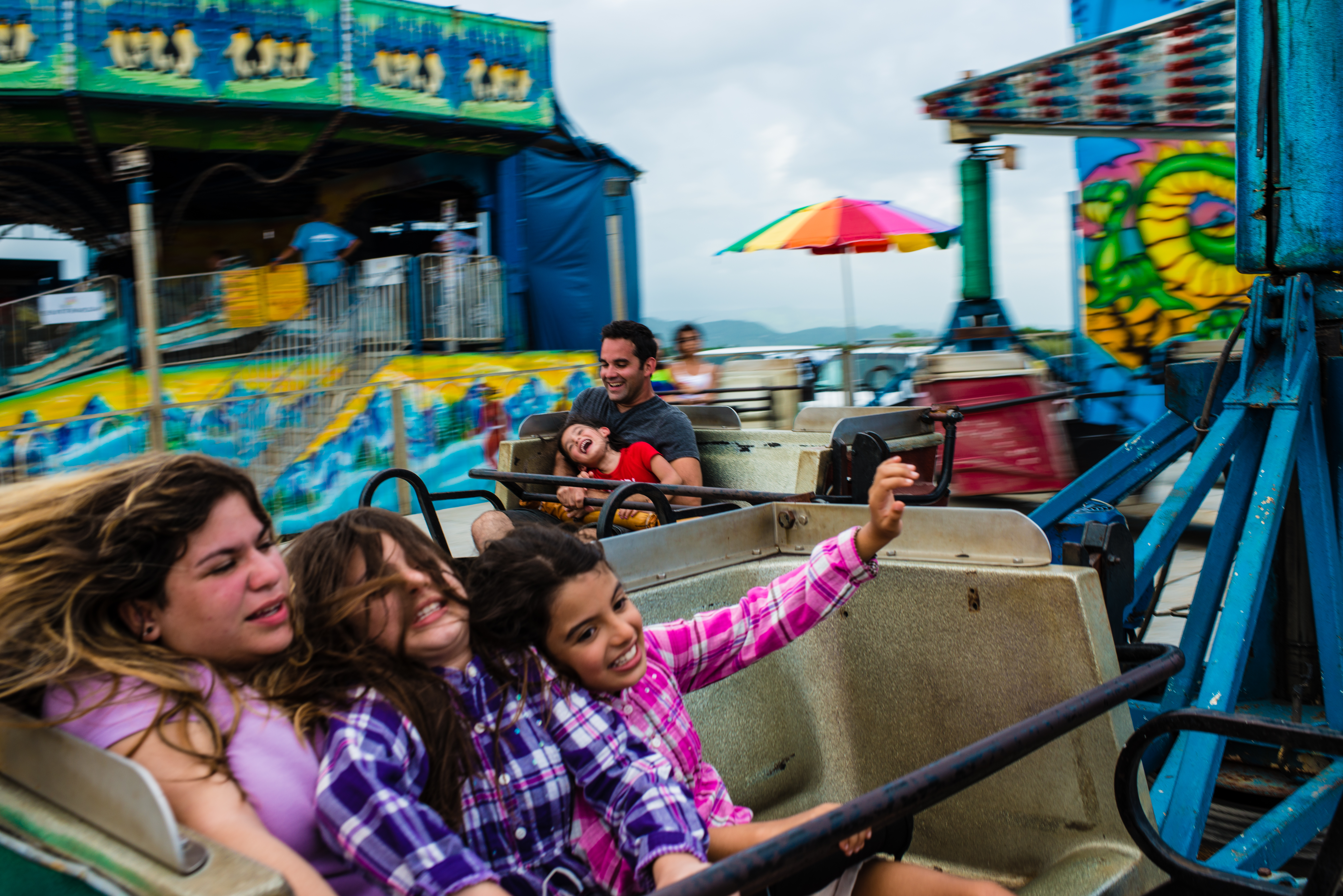
Children at Feria Agrícola Nacional Del Valle De Lajas

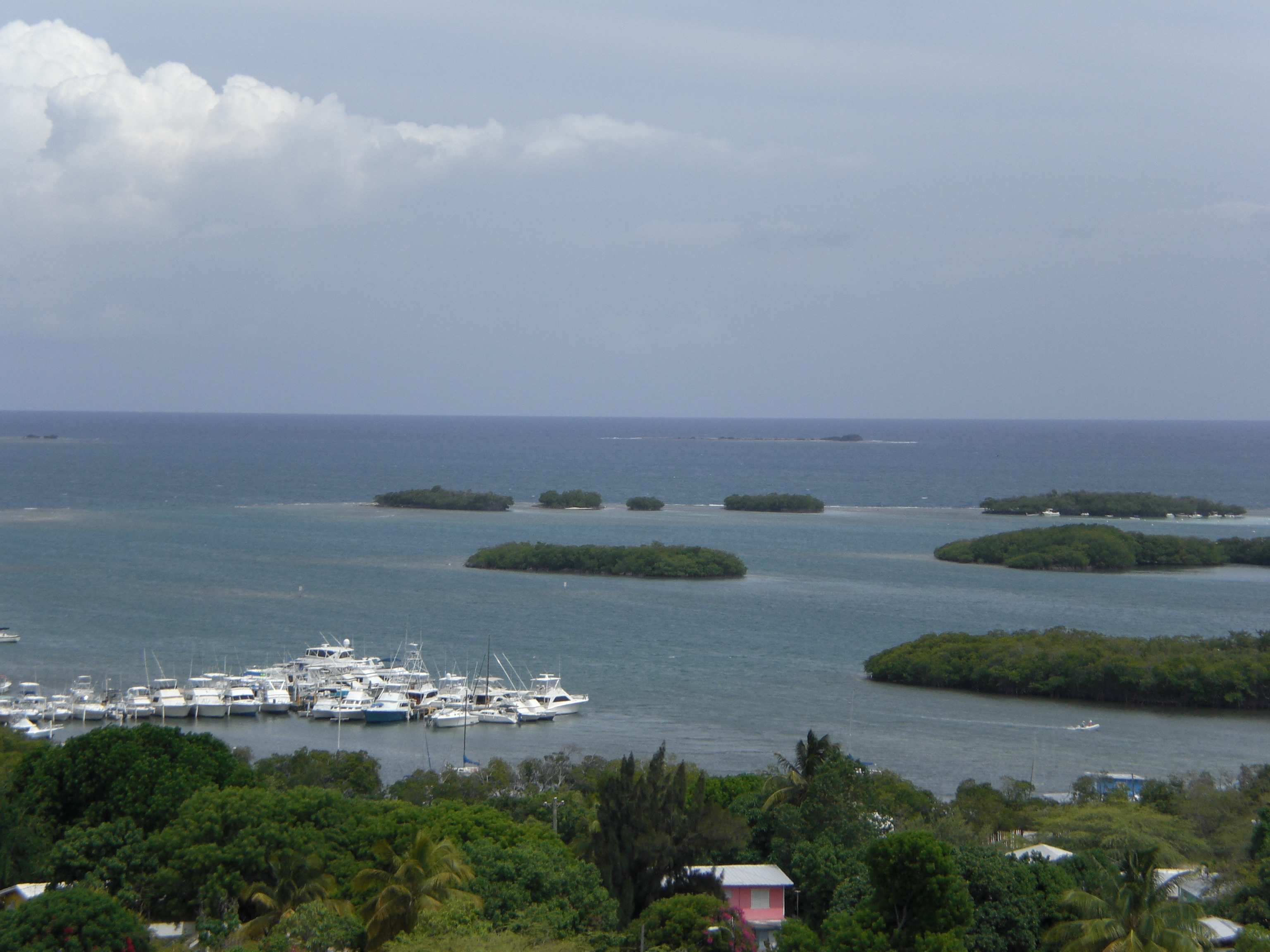
Cays and boats in La Parguera

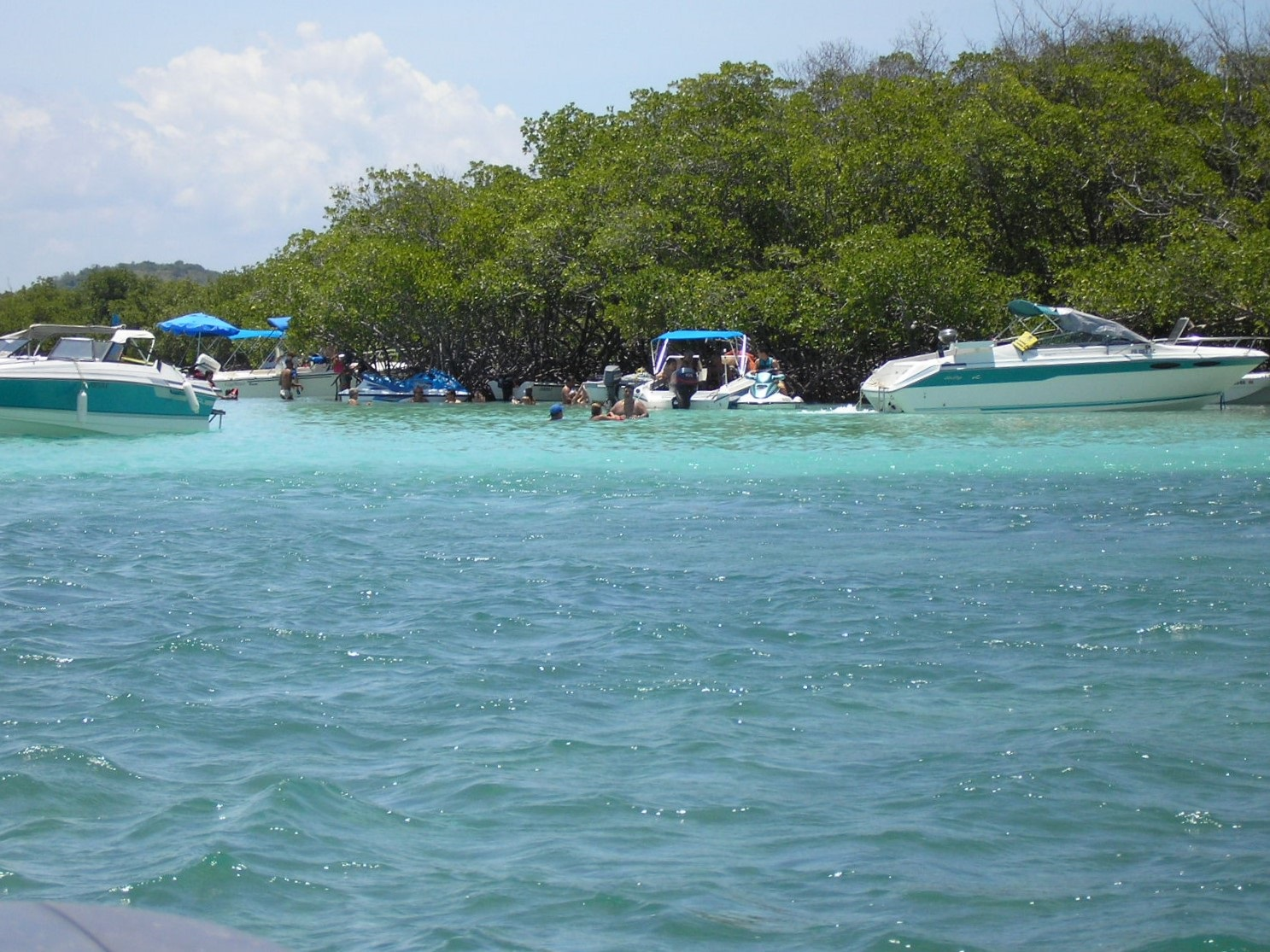
Boats in the Caribbean Sea in Lajas

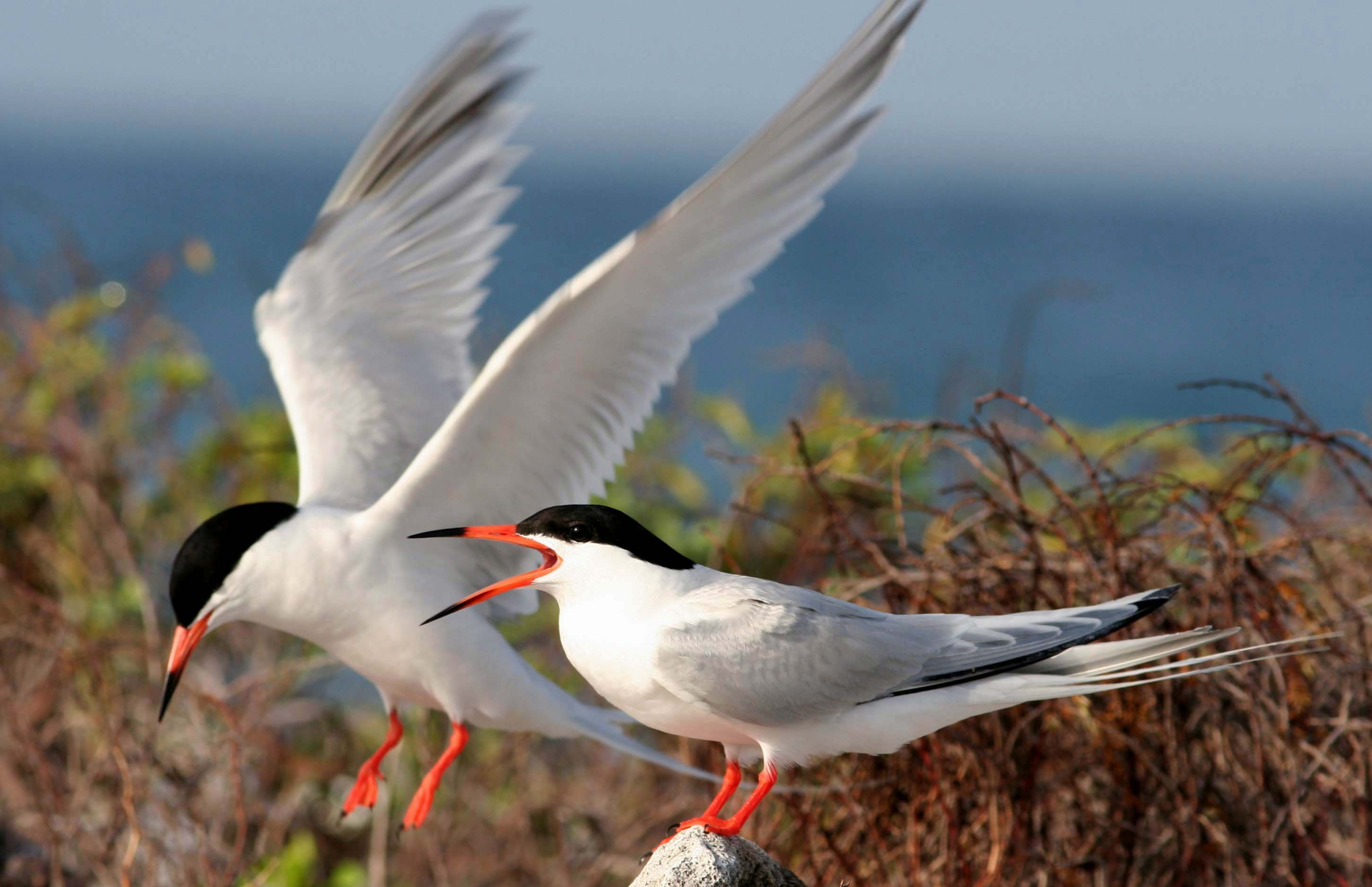
Roseate tern at La Parguera, (on the list of threatened species)

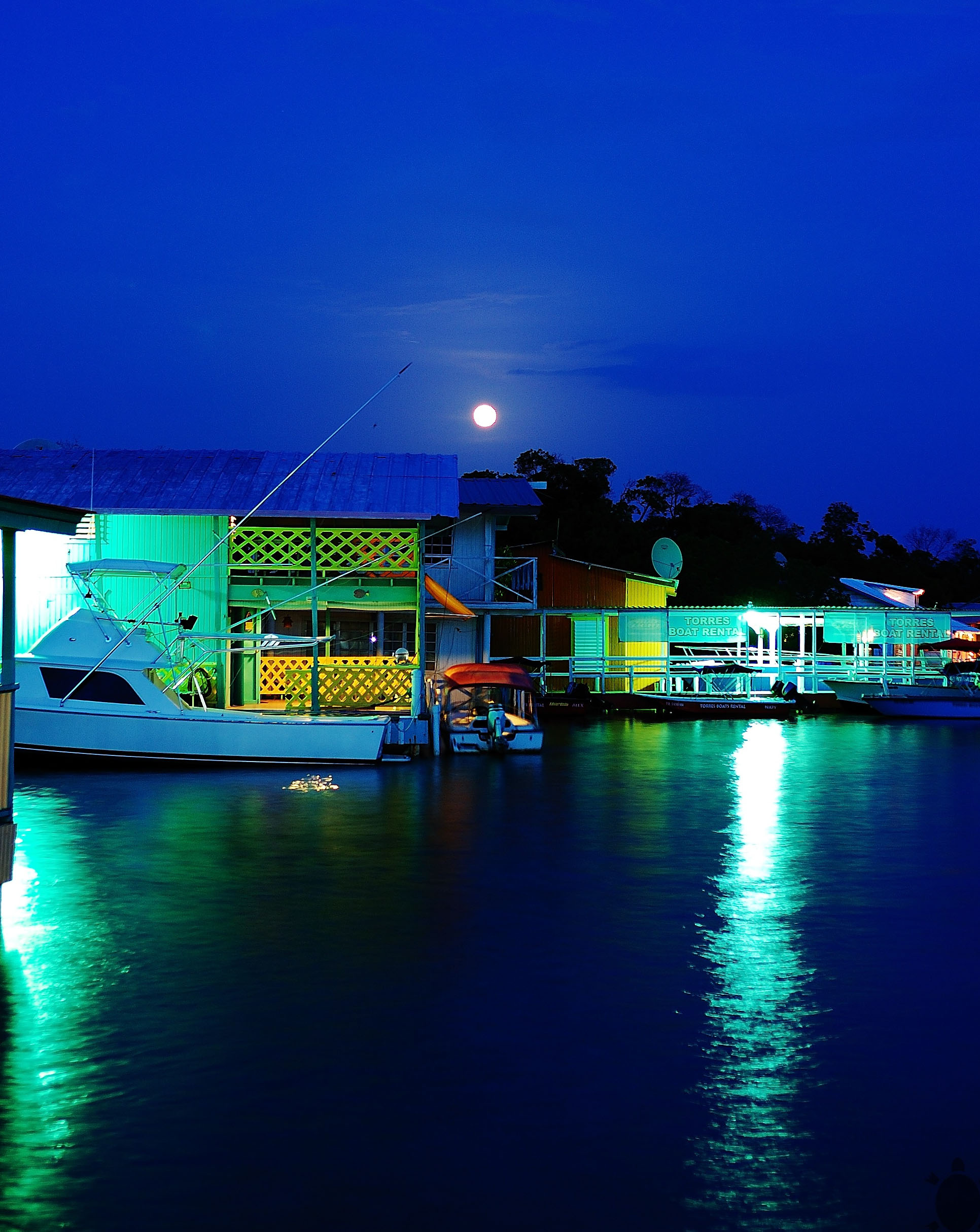
Moonrise over the dock at La Parguera

== See also ==
- List of Puerto Ricans
- History of Puerto Rico
- National Register of Historic Places listings in Lajas, Puerto Rico
- Did you know-Puerto Rico?
