= Torre =

Torre (plurals torri and torres) means tower in seven Romance languages (Portuguese, Spanish, Galician, Catalan, Italian, Occitan and Corsican) and may refer to:

== Biology ==
- Muir-Torre syndrome, the inherited cancer syndrome
- Sypharochiton torri, a mollusc

== Chess ==
- Carlos Torre Repetto, Mexican chess grandmaster
  - Torre Attack, an opening in chess
- Eugenio Torre (born 1951), Filipino chess grandmaster
- A rook in chess, alternatively called a torre

== Places ==
=== Brazil ===
- Torre, a neighborhood in the metropolitan area of Recife

=== England ===
- Torre, Torquay, an area of Torquay in Devon
- Torre, Somerset, a hamlet in the county of Somerset

=== Italy ===
- Torre Annunziata, a comune in the province of Naples in the region of Campania
- Torre Archirafi, a frazione in the comune of Riposto in the province of Catania in the region of Sicily
- Torre Boldone, a comune in the province of Bergamo in the region of Lombardy
- Torre Bormida, a comune in the province of Cuneo in the region Piedmont
- Torre Canavese, a comune in the province of Turin in the region Piedmont
- Torre de' Busi, a comune in the province of Lecco in the region Lombardy
- Torre del Greco, a comune in the province of Naples in the region of Campania
- Torre Mondovì, a comune in the province of Cuneo in the region Piedmont
- Torre Pallavicina, a comune in the province of Bergamo in the region of Lombardy
- Torre Pellice, a comune in the province of Turin in the region Piedmont

Other variants

- Torri del Benaco, a comune in the province of Verona in the region of Veneto
- Torri di Quartesolo, a comune in the province of Vicenza in the region of Veneto
- Torri in Sabina, a comune in the province of Rieti in the Italian of Latium
- Torri Superiore, a medieval village in the commune of Ventimiglia in the province of Imperia in the region of Liguria
- Campolongo al Torre, a commune in the province of Udine in the region of Friuli-Venezia Giulia
- Largo di Torre Argentina, a square in the ancient Campus Martius, Rome
- San Vito al Torre, a comune in the province of Udine in the region of Friuli-Venezia Giulia

=== Mexico ===
- Martínez de la Torre, Veracruz, a municipality in the State of Veracruz

=== Portugal ===
- Torre (Amares), a civil parish in the municipality of Amares
- Torre (Cascais), a civil parish in the municipality of Cascais

=== Puerto Rico ===
- Torre, Sabana Grande, Puerto Rico, a barrio

=== Spain ===
- Torre (Treviño), a hamlet
- La Torre, a municipality in the province of Ávila, autonomous community of Castile and León
- Torre Alháquime, a village in the province of Cádiz, autonomous community of Andalusia
- Torre-Cardela, a municipality in the province of Granada, autonomous community of Andalusia
- Torre de Arcas, a municipality in the province of Teruel, autonomous community of Aragon
- Torre de las Arcas, a municipality in the province of Teruel, autonomous community of Aragon
- Torre del Compte, a municipality in the Matarraña/Matarranya in the province of Teruel, autonomous community of Aragon
- Torre los Negros, a municipality in the Matarraña/Matarranya in the province of Teruel, autonomous community of Aragon
- Torre-Pacheco, a municipality in the autonomous region of Murcia
- Torre de Loizaga, a Castle in the autonomous community of the Basque Country

=== Switzerland ===
- Torre, Switzerland, a municipality in the district of Blenio, canton of Ticino

== Geographic features ==
=== Elevations ===
- Cerro Torre, a mountain in the Patagonian Ice Field
- Torre de Aspa, an elevation on the coast of Portugal
- Torre de Cerredo, a peak in Spain
- Torre (Serra da Estrela), the highest point of mainland Portugal

=== Islands ===
- Torre Astura, an island near Anzio

=== Streams ===
- Torre River, a tributary of the Isonzo

== Structures ==
=== Modern skyscrapers ===
- Torre Agbar, a building in Barcelona, Spain
- Torre Bicentenario, planned and cancelled building of Mexico City
- Torre Caja Madrid, a new skyscraper in Madrid, Spain
- Torre Caney, planned skyscraper of the Dominican Republic
- Torre de Collserola, uniquely designed tower in Barcelona
- Torre de Cristal (disambiguation), multiple structures
- Torre Espacio, a new skyscraper in Madrid, Spain
- Torre Europa (disambiguation), multiple structures
- Torre Fundadores, planned skyscraper of Monterrey, Mexico
- Torre Latinoamericana, a building in Mexico City, Mexico
- Torre Mapfre, skyscraper in Barcelona
- Torre Mayor, skyscraper of Mexico City
- Torre Picasso, a skyscraper in Madrid, Spain

=== Telecommunications towers ===
- Torre Entel, in Santiago, Chile
- Torre España, in Madrid

=== Tramway towers ===
- Torre Jaume I, tramway tower of Barcelona
- Torre Sant Sebastia, tramway tower in Barcelona

=== Other uses in structures ===
- Torre degli Asinelli, the highest of the Towers of Bologna in Italy
- Torre Abbey, a building in Britain
- Torre Ader, monumental tower of Buenos Aires
- Torre della Ghirlandina, a bell-tower in Italy
- Torre del Oro, medieval watchtower in Seville
- Torre di Moravola, hotel in Umbria Italy
- Torre railway station, in the UK
- Torre (WSMR) railway station, also in the UK
- Torri, structures from which the Torréen Culture on Corsica is named

== Other uses ==
- Torre (name)
- Torre, one of 17 contrade of Siena

== See also ==
- Torres (disambiguation)
- De la Torre
