= Puerto Rico Highway 120 =

Highway in Puerto Rico

Highway 120
- Ruta 120

Route information
- Maintained by Puerto Rico DTPW
- Length: 32.8 km (20.4 mi)

Major junctions
- South end: Calle Neponucema Santiago / Calle 65 de Infantería in Sabana Grande barrio-pueblo
- PR-366 in Santana–Tabonuco; PR-105 in Maricao Afuera; PR-357 in Maricao Afuera–Maricao barrio-pueblo; PR-410 in Maricao Afuera–Maricao barrio-pueblo; PR-105 in Maricao barrio-pueblo; PR-408 in Naranjales–Maravilla Sur; PR-106 in Maravilla Sur–Naranjales
- North end: PR-124 in Las Marías barrio-pueblo

Location
- Country: United States
- Territory: Puerto Rico
- Municipalities: Sabana Grande, San Germán, Maricao, Las Marías

Highway system
- Roads in Puerto Rico; List
← PR-119	→ PR-121

Puerto Rico Highway 120 (PR-120) is a main highway connecting Las Marías, Maricao and Sabana Grande, and is the main road through the Monte del Estado.

== Major intersections ==
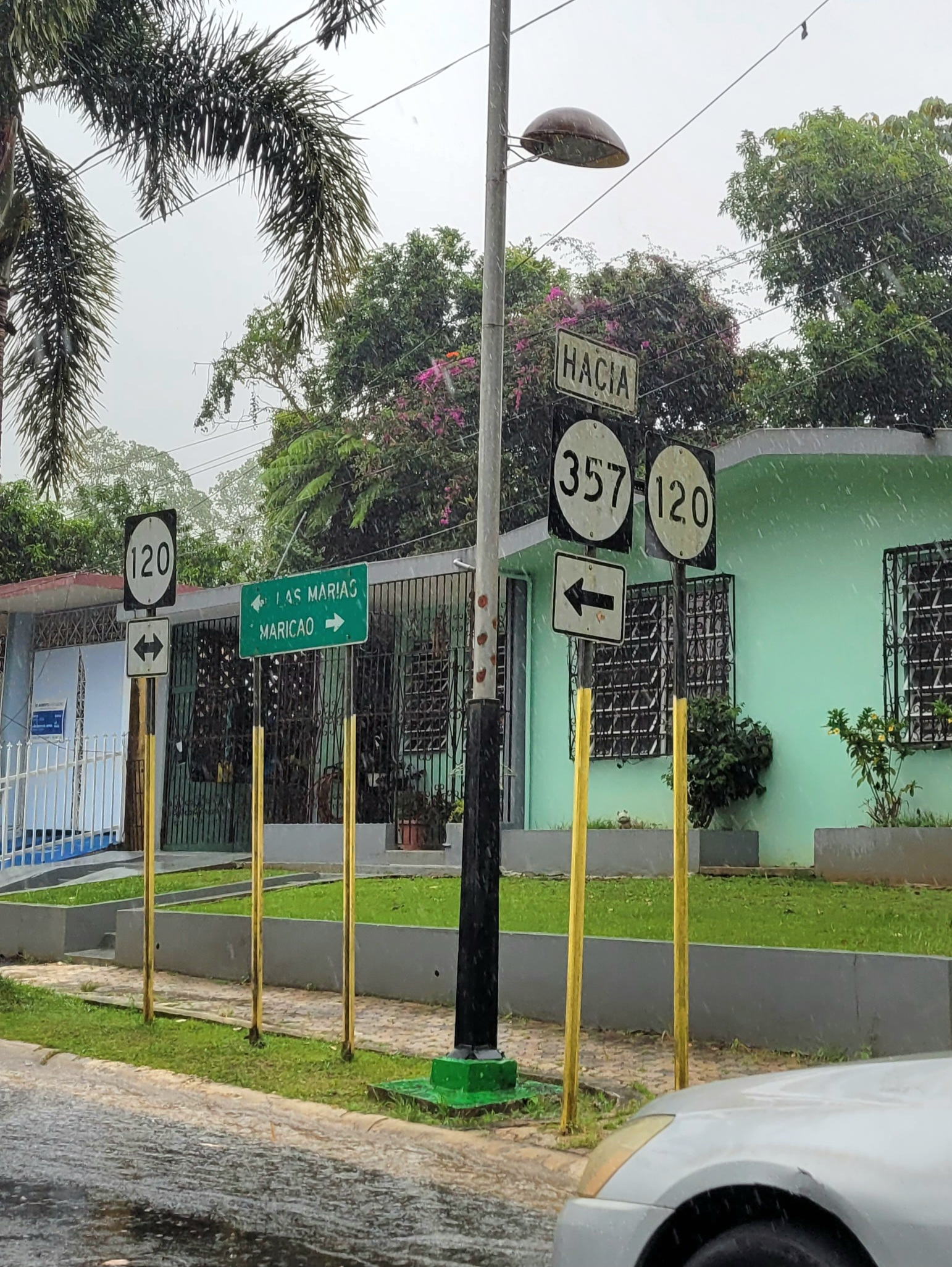
PR-120 north at PR-357 intersection in Maricao barrio-pueblo

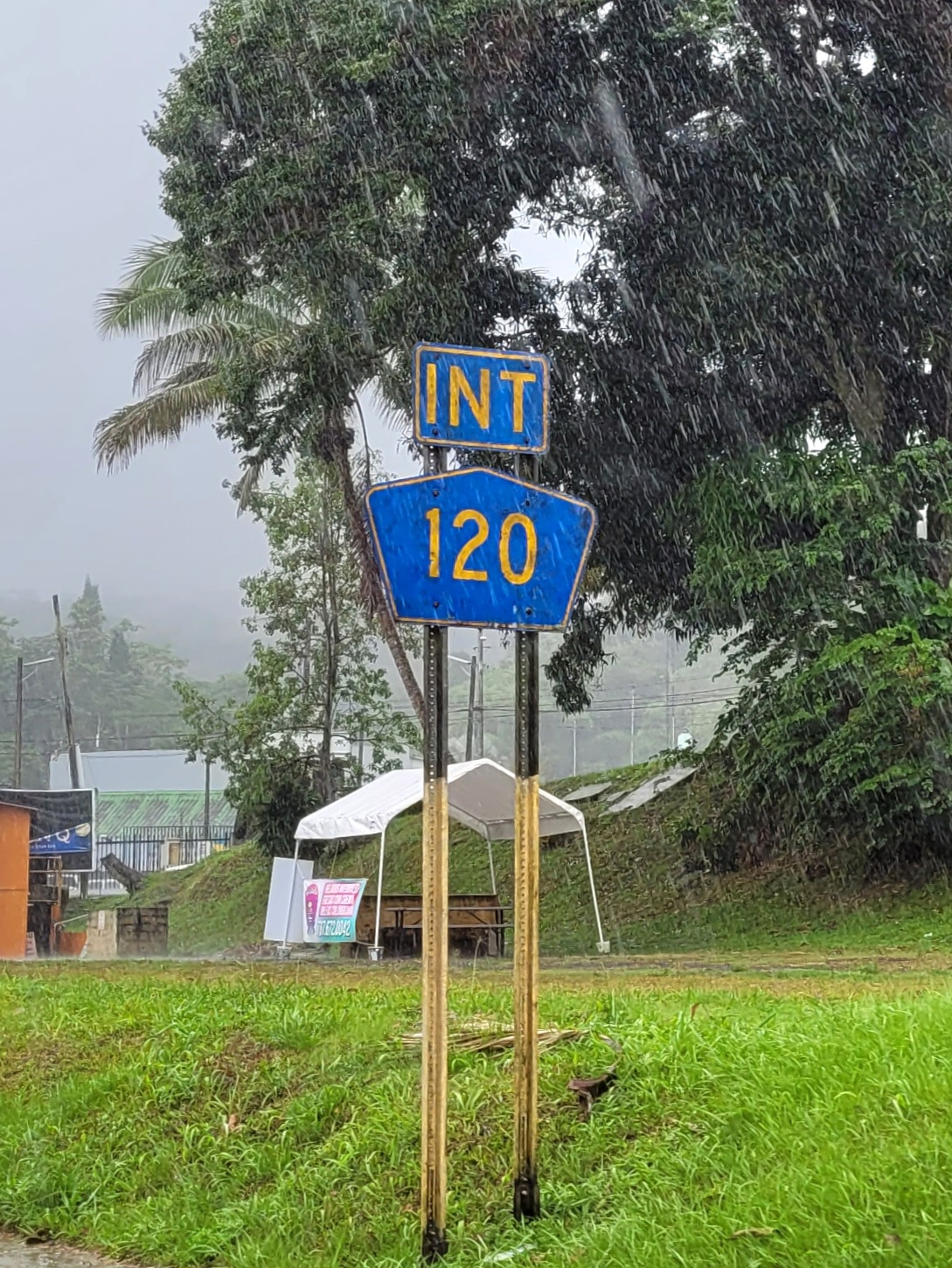
PR-357 east approaching PR-120 junction in downtown Maricao

Municipality	Location	km	mi	Destinations	Notes
Sabana Grande	Sabana Grande barrio-pueblo	0.0	0.0	PR-Calle Neponucema Santiago / PR-Calle 65 de Infantería – Sabana Grande	Southern terminus of PR-120
Sabana Grande	Santana–Tabonuco line	11.0	6.8	PR-366 (Ruta Panorámica) – Indiera Fría	Southern terminus of the Ruta Panorámica concurrency; the Ruta Panorámica continues toward Yauco
San Germán	No major junctions				
Maricao	Maricao Afuera	20.1 23.1 (Note: Kilometer markers represent the distance along PR-105 rather than PR-120.)	12.5 14.4	PR-105 – Mayagüez	Western terminus of PR-105 concurrency
Maricao	See PR-105				
Maricao	Maricao barrio-pueblo	24.7 20.2	15.3 12.6	PR-105 east (Calle Primero de Abril) – Lares, Yauco	Eastern terminus of PR-105 concurrency
Las Marías	Naranjales–Maravilla Sur line	25.5	15.8	PR-408 – Palma Escrita	
Las Marías	Naranjales–Maravilla Sur line	26.9	16.7	PR-106 west (Ruta Panorámica) – Mayagüez	Northern terminus of the Ruta Panorámica concurrency
Las Marías	Las Marías barrio-pueblo	32.8	20.4	PR-124 to PR-119 – Las Marías, Lares, San Sebastián	Northern terminus of PR-120
1.000 mi = 1.609 km; 1.000 km = 0.621 mi: Concurrency terminus
