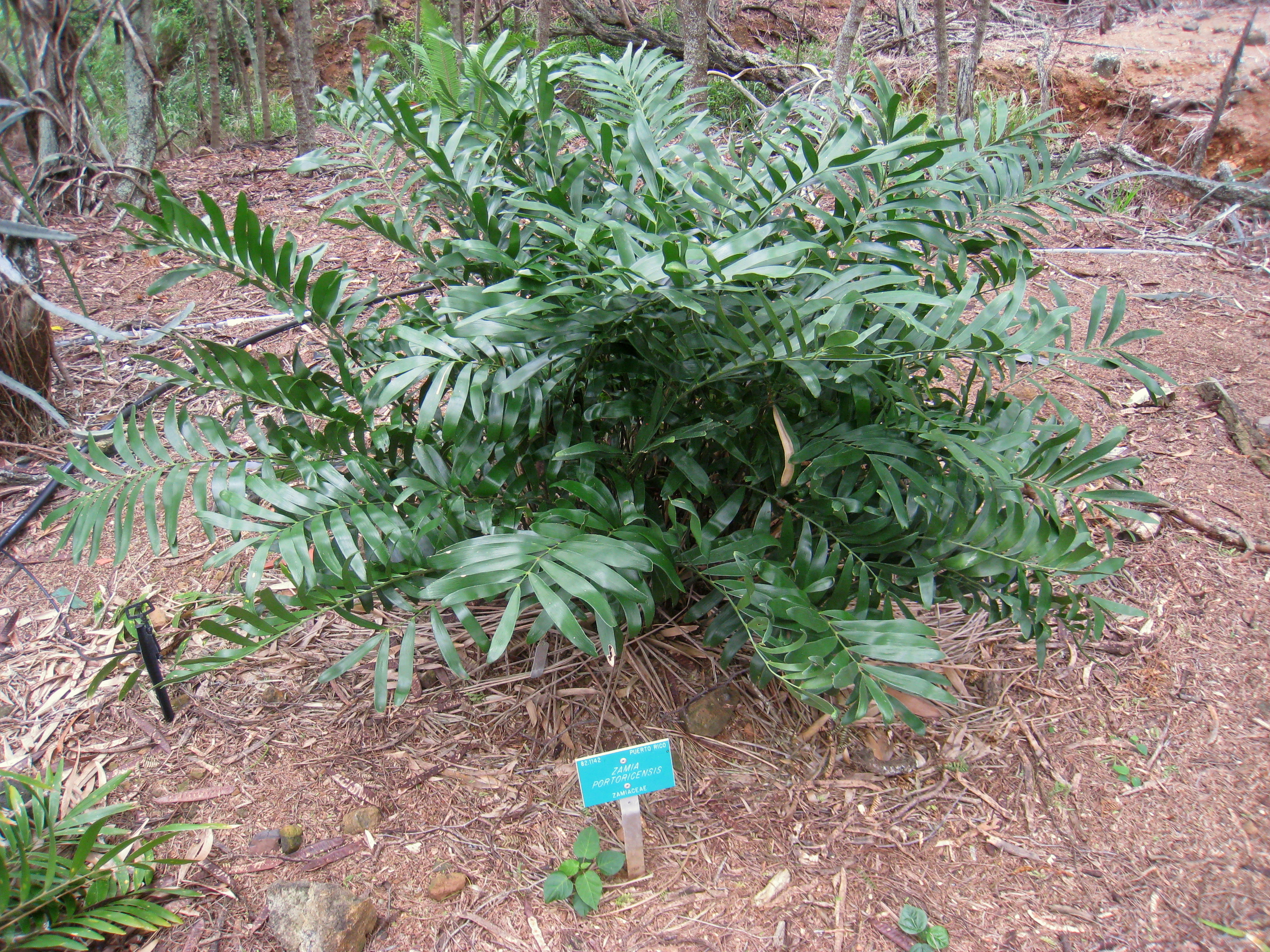

Conservation status
- Endangered (IUCN 3.1)

Scientific classification
- Kingdom: Plantae
- Clade: Tracheophytes
- Clade: Gymnospermae
- Division: Cycadophyta
- Class: Cycadopsida
- Order: Cycadales
- Family: Zamiaceae
- Genus: Zamia
- Species: Z. portoricensis

Binomial name
- Zamia portoricensis Urb.

= Zamia portoricensis =

Species of plant

Zamia portoricensis, also known in Puerto Rican Spanish as marunguey, is a species of plant in the family Zamiaceae. It is endemic to the Susúa State Forest region of western Puerto Rico.

Z. portoricensis is part of the Zamia pumila species complex.

== Mutualism ==
The beetle Pharaxonotha portophylla is in an obligatory mutualistic relationship with Zamia portiricensis, living and breeding in male cones and consuming pollen and cone tissues while serving as a pollinating vector by transferring pollen to female cones.
