= Susúa State Forest =

State forest in Puerto Rico

Coordinates: 18.083°N 66.905°W

Susúa State Forest Spanish: Bosque Estatal de Susúa
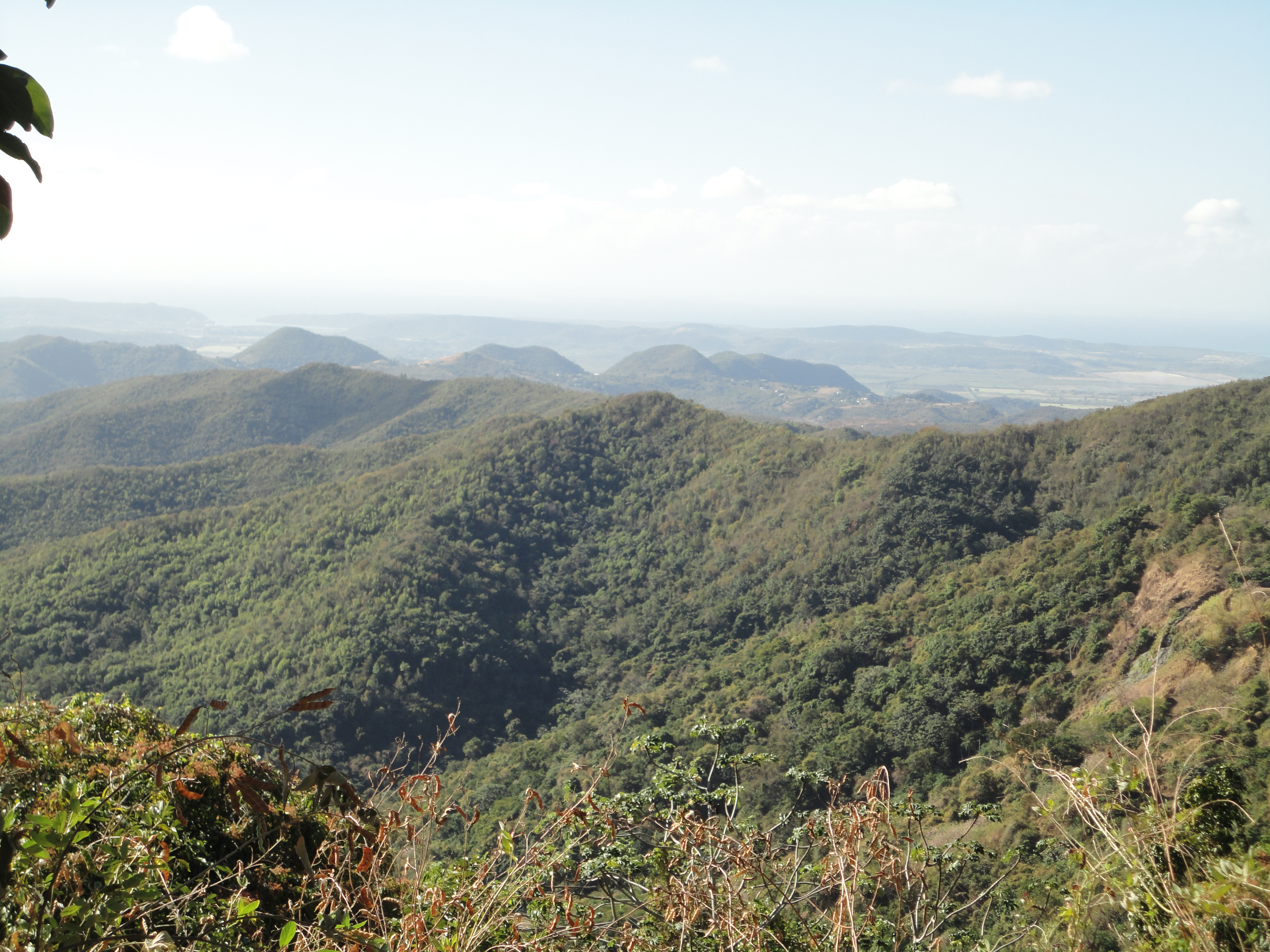
- Tabonuco forest in Susúa.
- Interactive map of Susúa State Forest

Geography
- Location: Sabana Grande, Yauco

Administration
- Website: www.drna.gobierno.pr

Ecology
- WWF Classification: Puerto Rican moist forests

Susúa State Forest (Spanish: Bosque Estatal de Susúa) is one of the 20 forest units that make up the public forest system of Puerto Rico. This forest is located in the southeastern foothills of the Central Mountain Range or Cordillera Central, in the municipalities of Sabana Grande and Yauco. Most of the forest, particularly the lower parts, are of secondary growth as the land had originally been deforested and used for cattle grazing, timber production and agriculture. The forest is an important habitat for the endangered Puerto Rican nightjar.

== History ==
Before its public acquisition, most of the original forest cover of this protected area had been razed for the purpose of cattle grazing.

The forest reserve was proclaimed in 1935 by the forestry division of the Puerto Rico Reconstruction Administration (PRRA) and subject to the 1917 Puerto Rico Forestry Law. The forest is now managed by the Puerto Rico Department of Natural and Environmental Resources (DRNA). The forest is also important for its archaeological value as many Taíno sites have been uncovered in the forest.

== Ecology ==
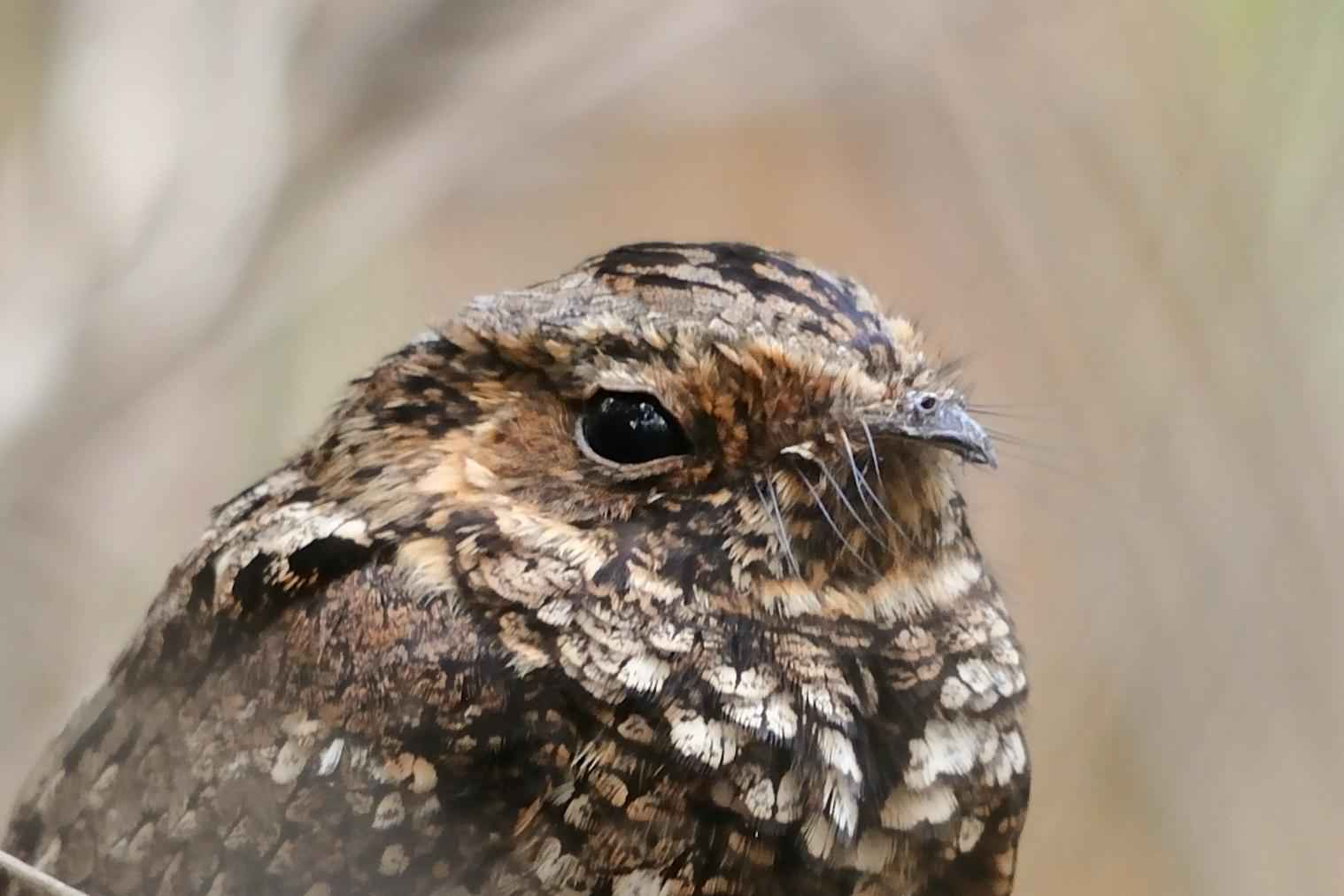
The forest is important to the endangered Puerto Rican nightjar.

The forest is an important transition zone from a subtropical moist broadleaf biome to a subtropical dry broadleaf biome which is important to several endangered species such as the Puerto Rican nightjar (Antrostomus noctitherus). The forest is also considered an important ecological corridor between the Guánica dry forest and the Maricao State Forest. There is a high rate of endemism in the forest and species such as the Zamia portoricensis and the Calliandra locoensis of the Fabaceae family is only found in the area and nowhere else in Puerto Rico or the world.

Some endangered or threatened species found in the forest are the pincho rose tree (Ottoschulzia rhodoxylon), the black cobana (Libidibia monosperma), the Sierra higuero (Crescentia portoricensis) and the threatened red fruit bat (Stenoderma rufum).

=== Gallery of flora and fauna ===
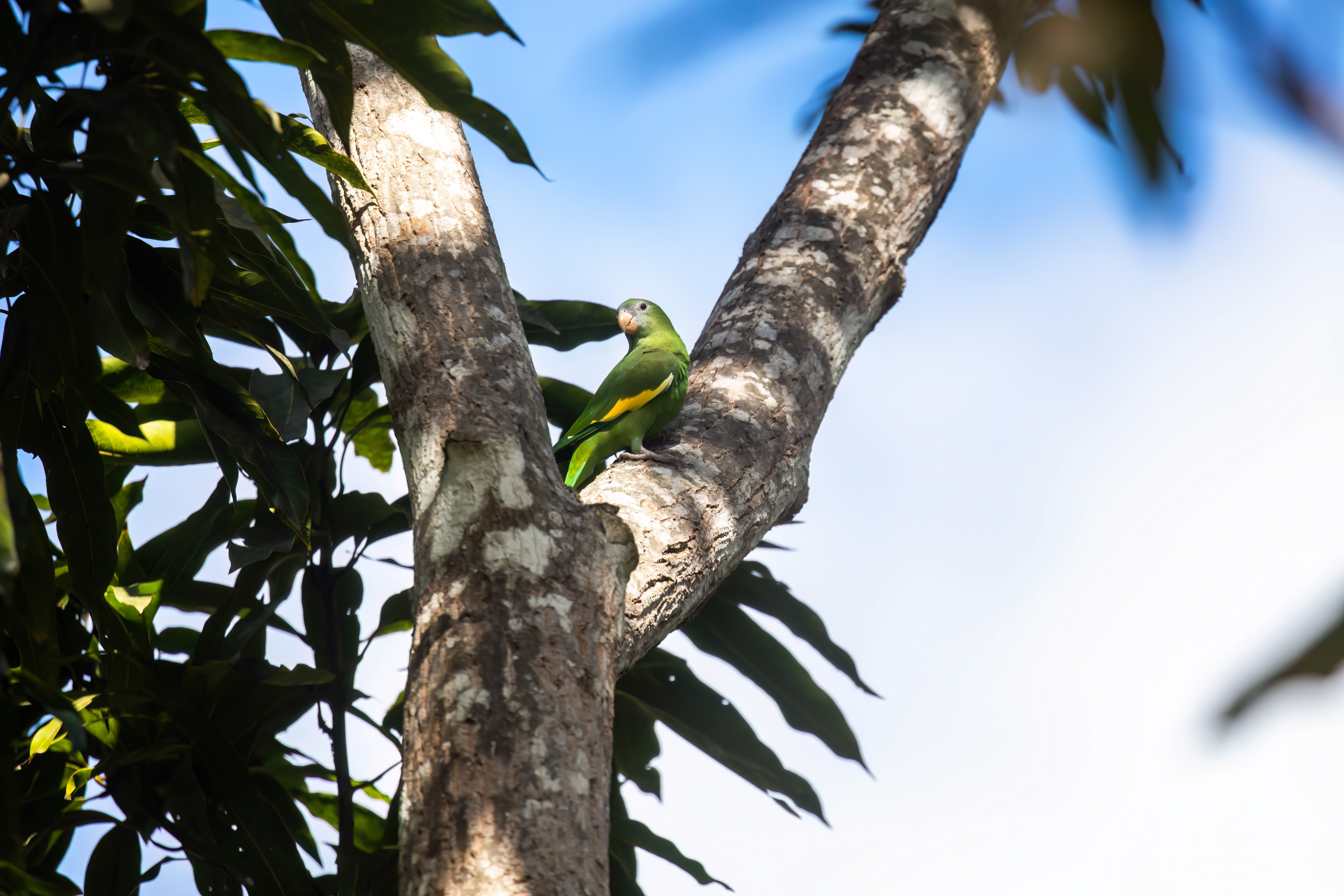
White-winged parakeet (Brotogeris versicolurus)

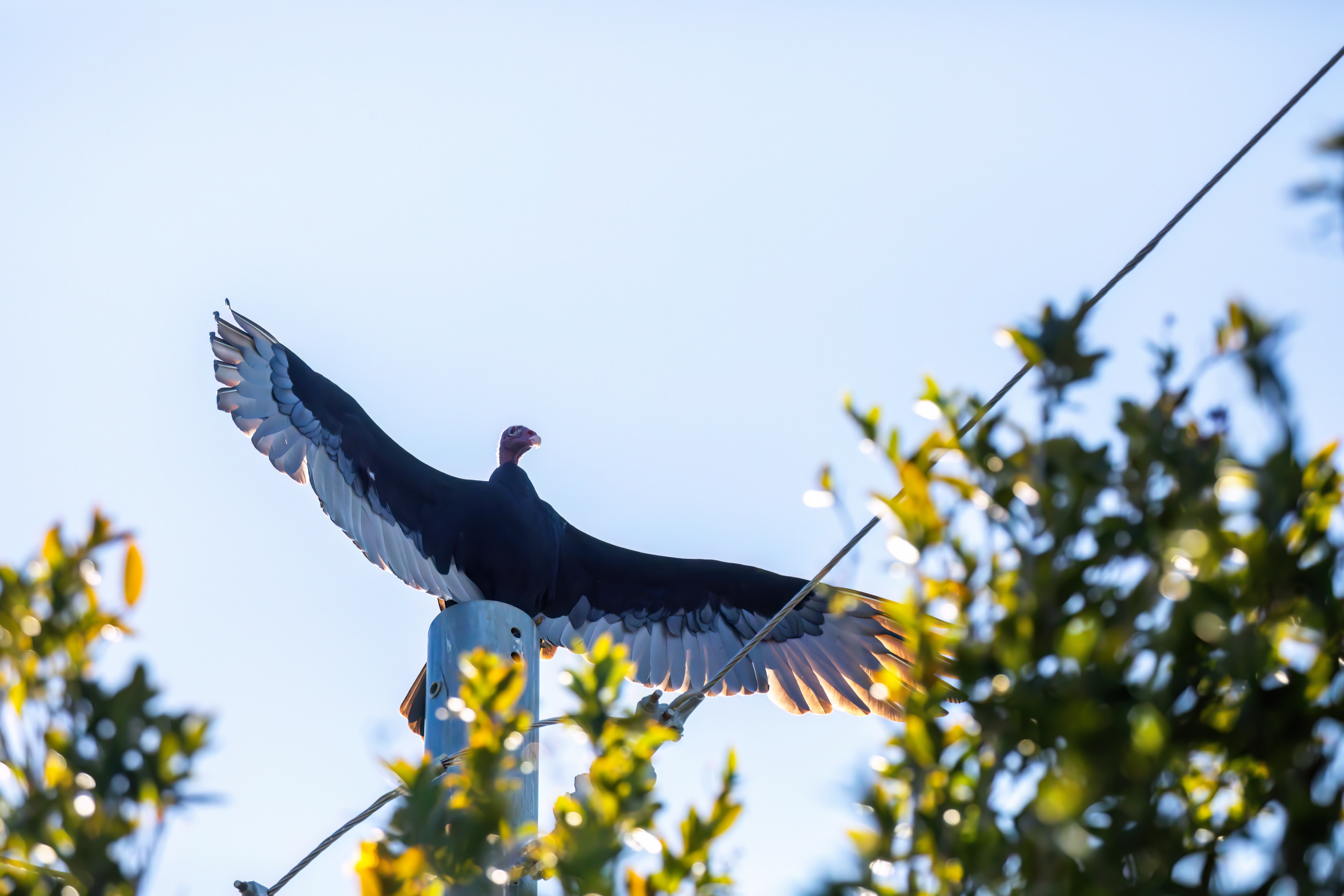
Turkey vulture (Cathartes aura)

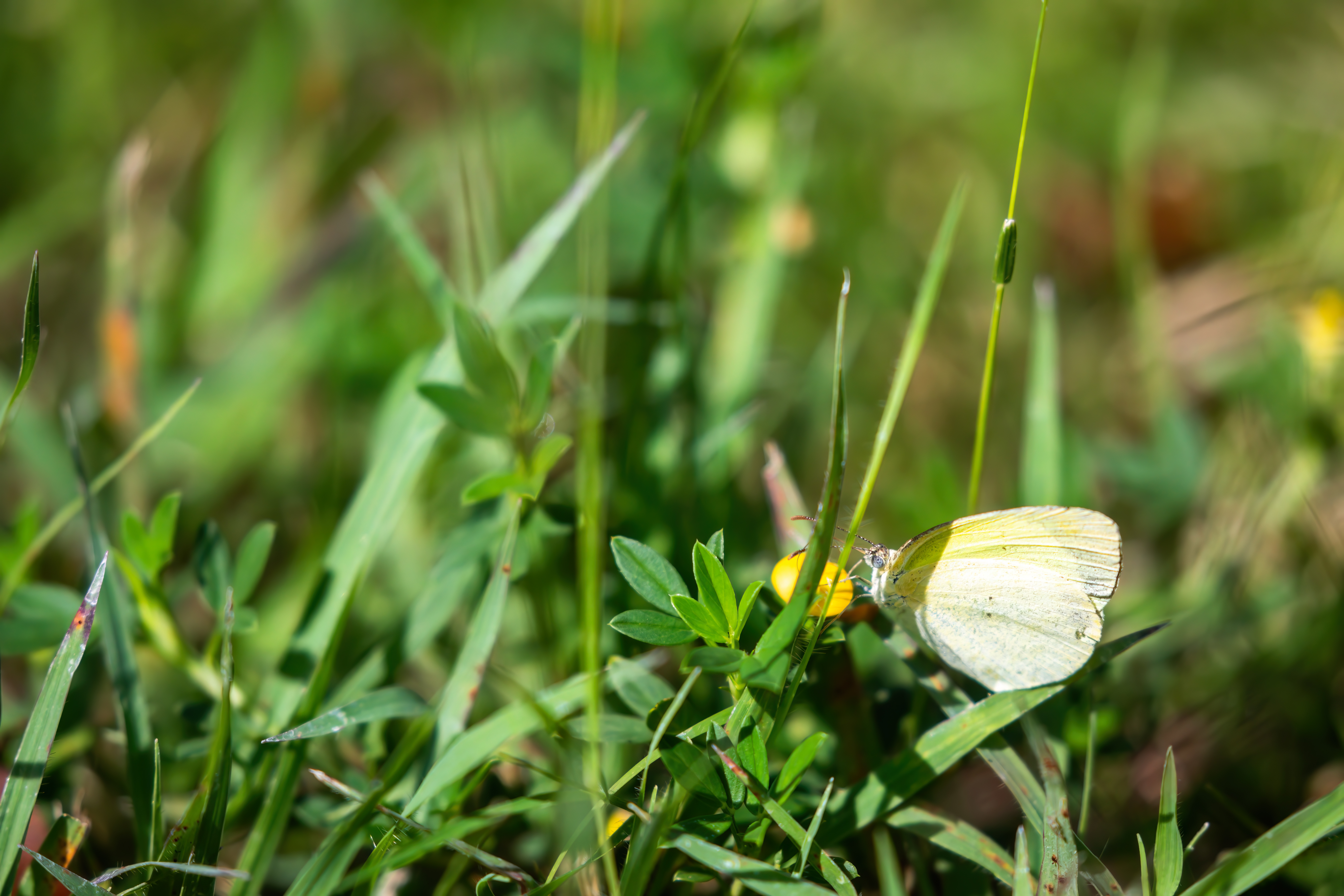
Barred yellow (Eurema daira)

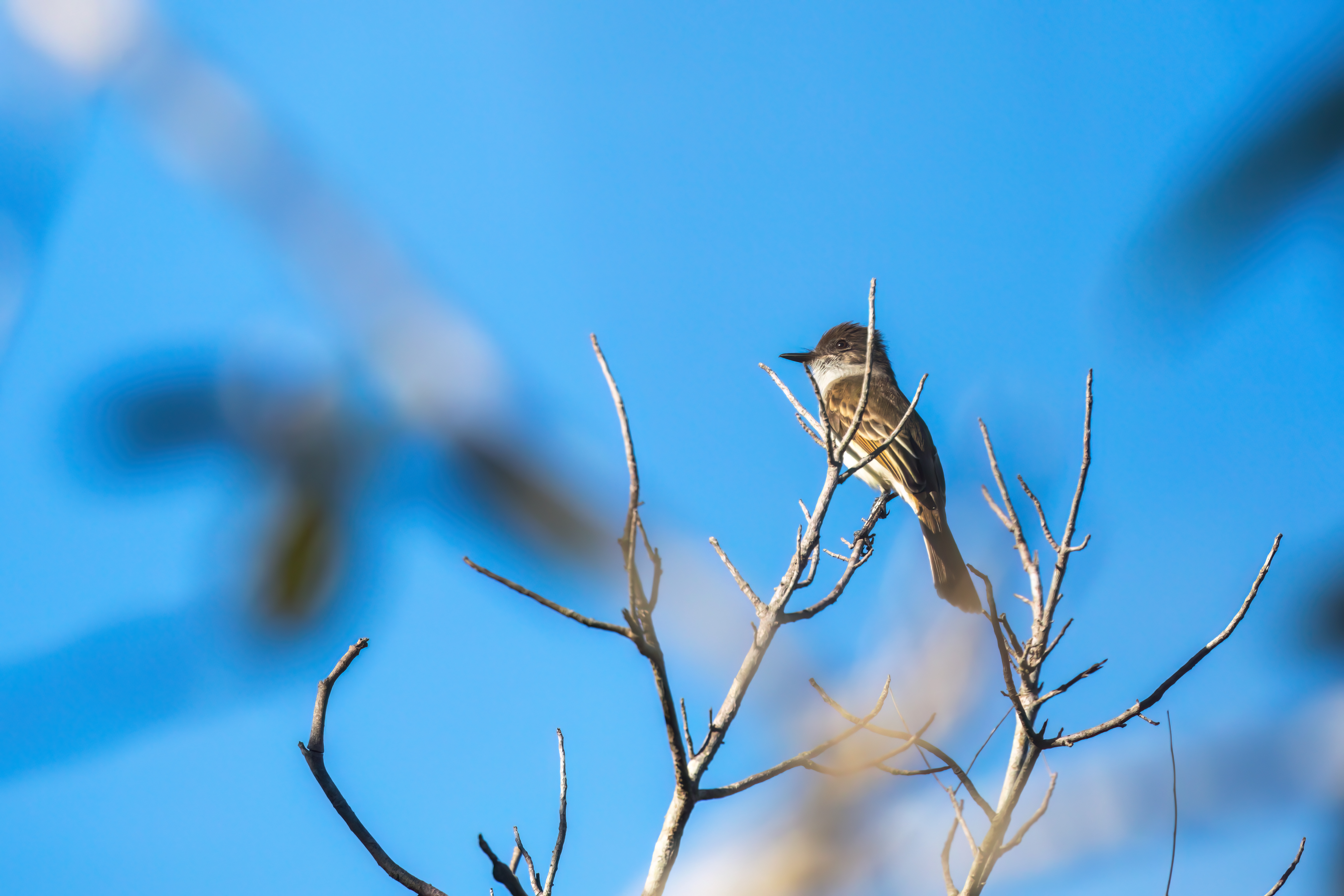
Puerto Rican flycatcher (Myiarchus antillarum)

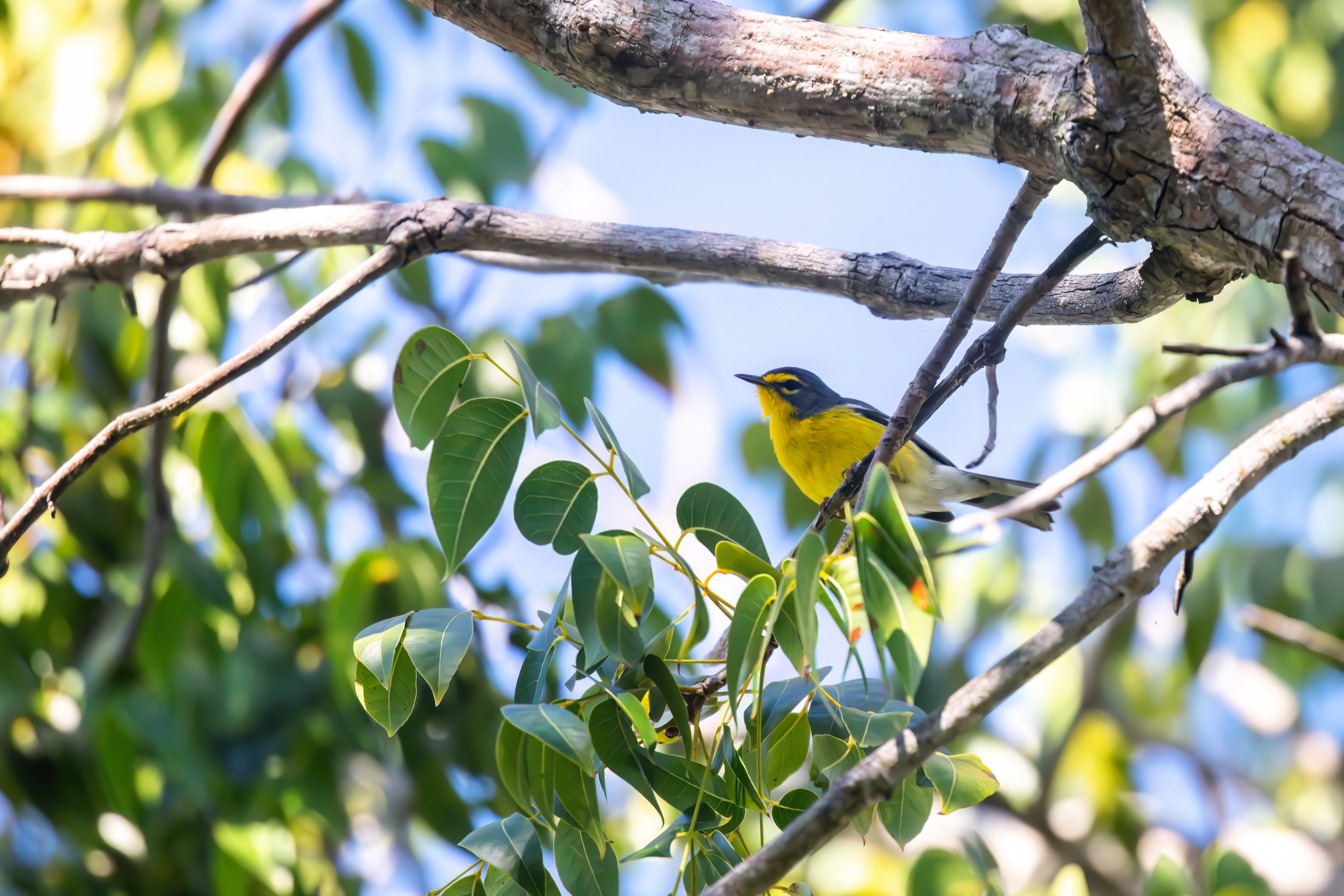
Adelaide's warbler (Setophaga adelaidae)

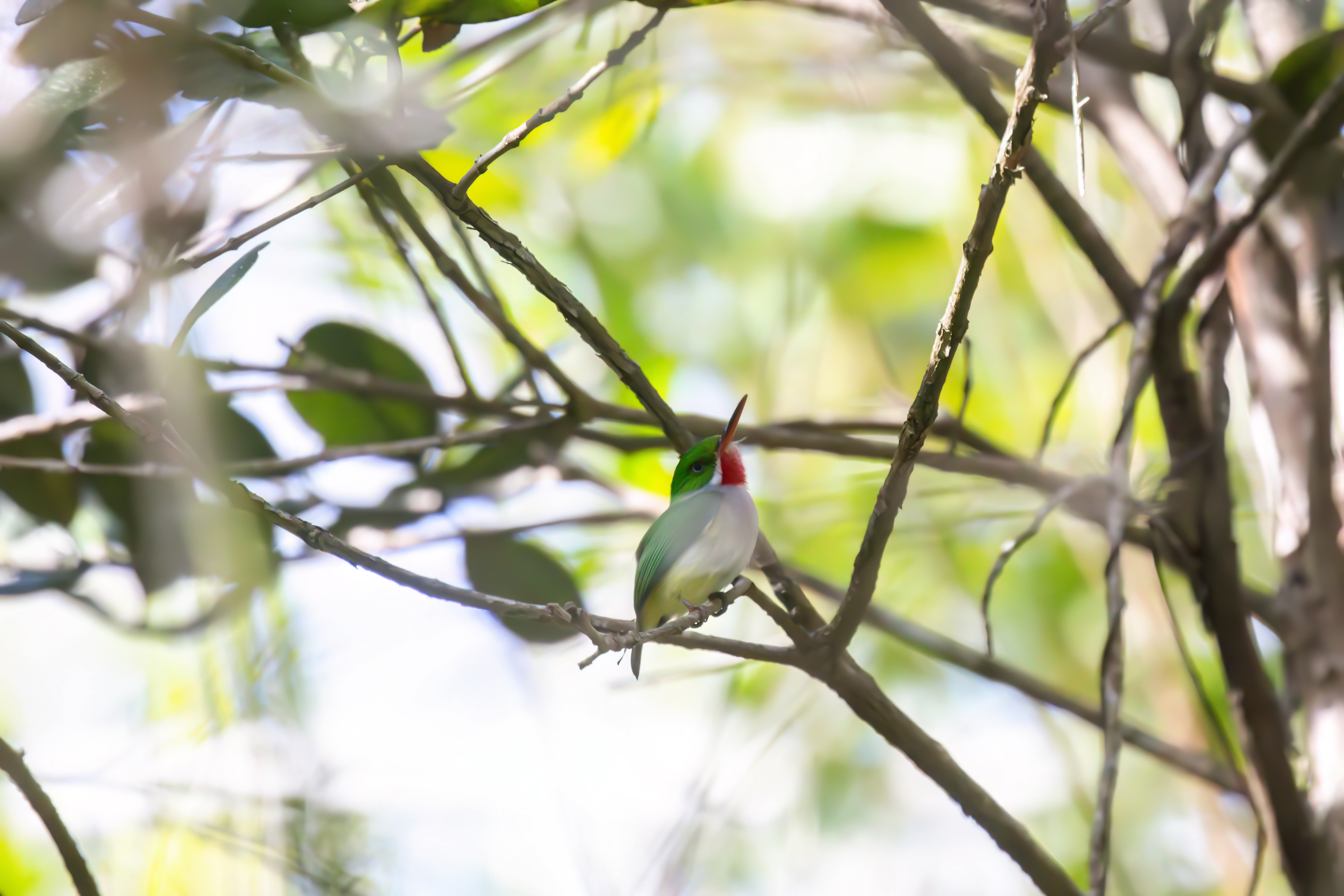
Puerto Rican tody (Todus mexicanus)

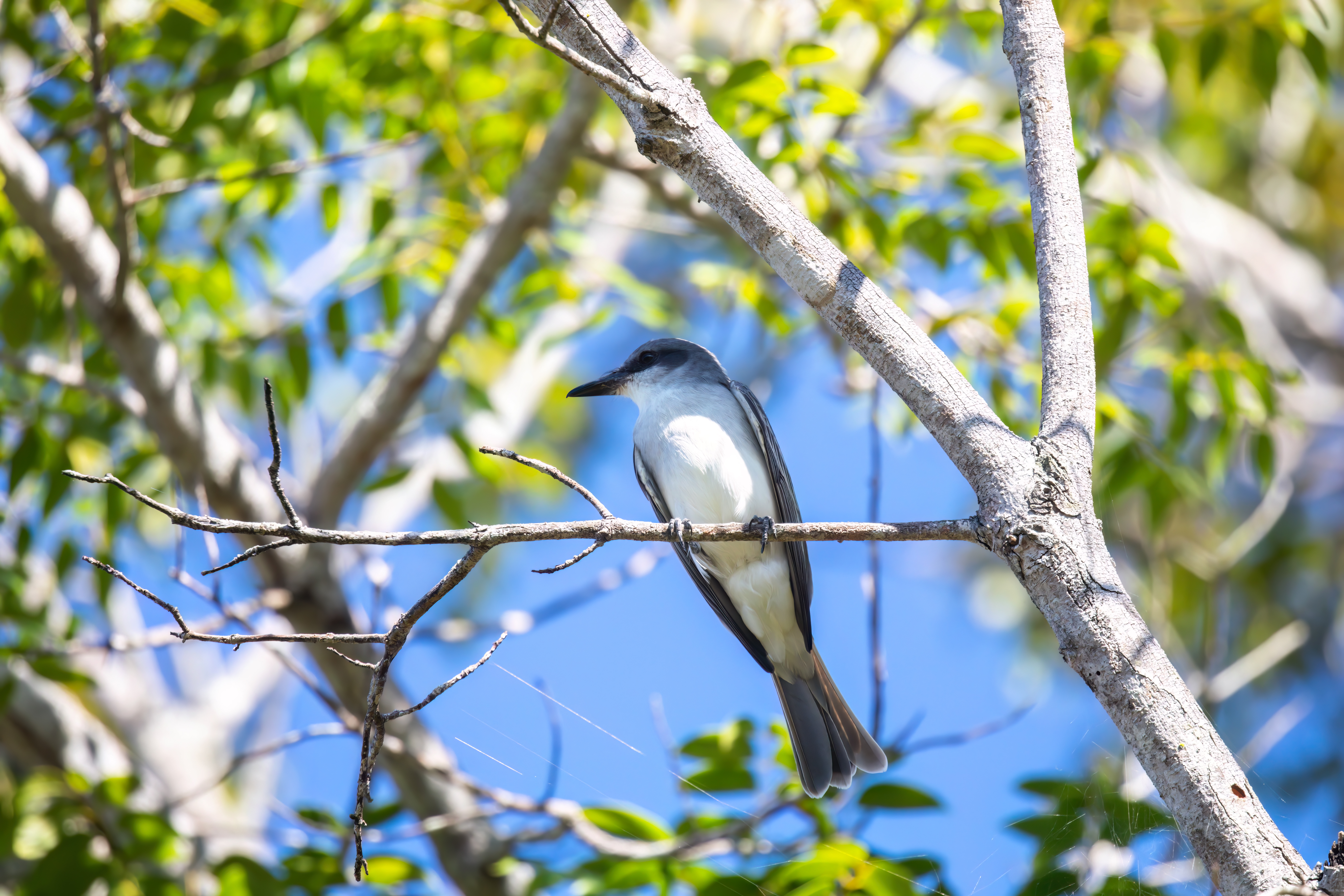
Gray kingbird (Tyrannus dominicensis)

== Recreation ==
The forest's recreational area has gazebos, barbecues, public bathrooms and showers, and five cabins ($40 per night) for overnight stays. Hiking is permitted in the forest on weekdays from 7:30 a.m. to 4:00 p.m. although visitors must contact the forest offices (787-999-2200 Ext. 5156) before arriving. Camping is also allowed ($6 per tent). The forest office also offers group tours and guided hikes, and support for researchers interested in conducting scientific investigation in the forest.

== See also ==
- List of Puerto Rico state forests
- Maricao State Forest
