= Susúa =

Barrio of Sabana Grande, Puerto Rico

- Barrio
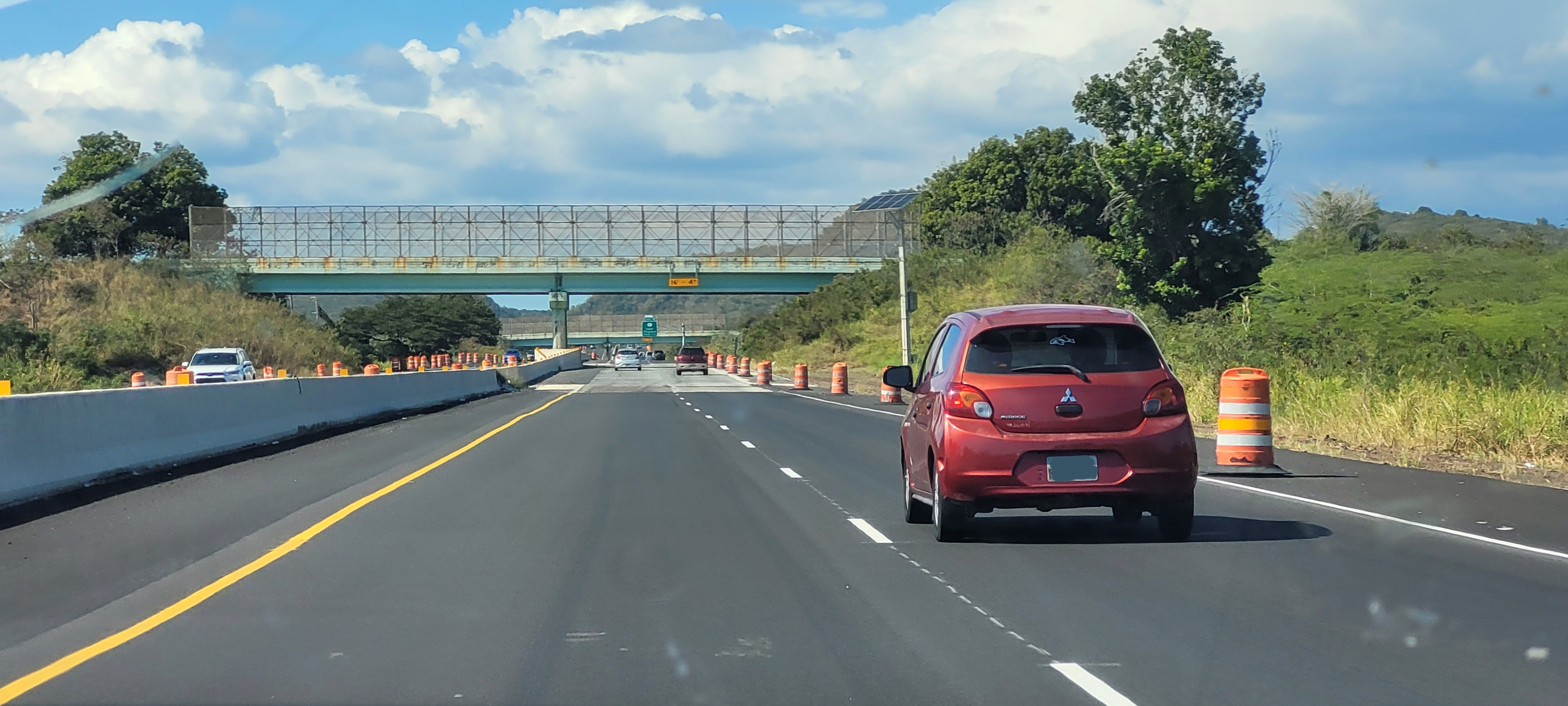
- Puerto Rico Highway 2 between Arena and Susúa

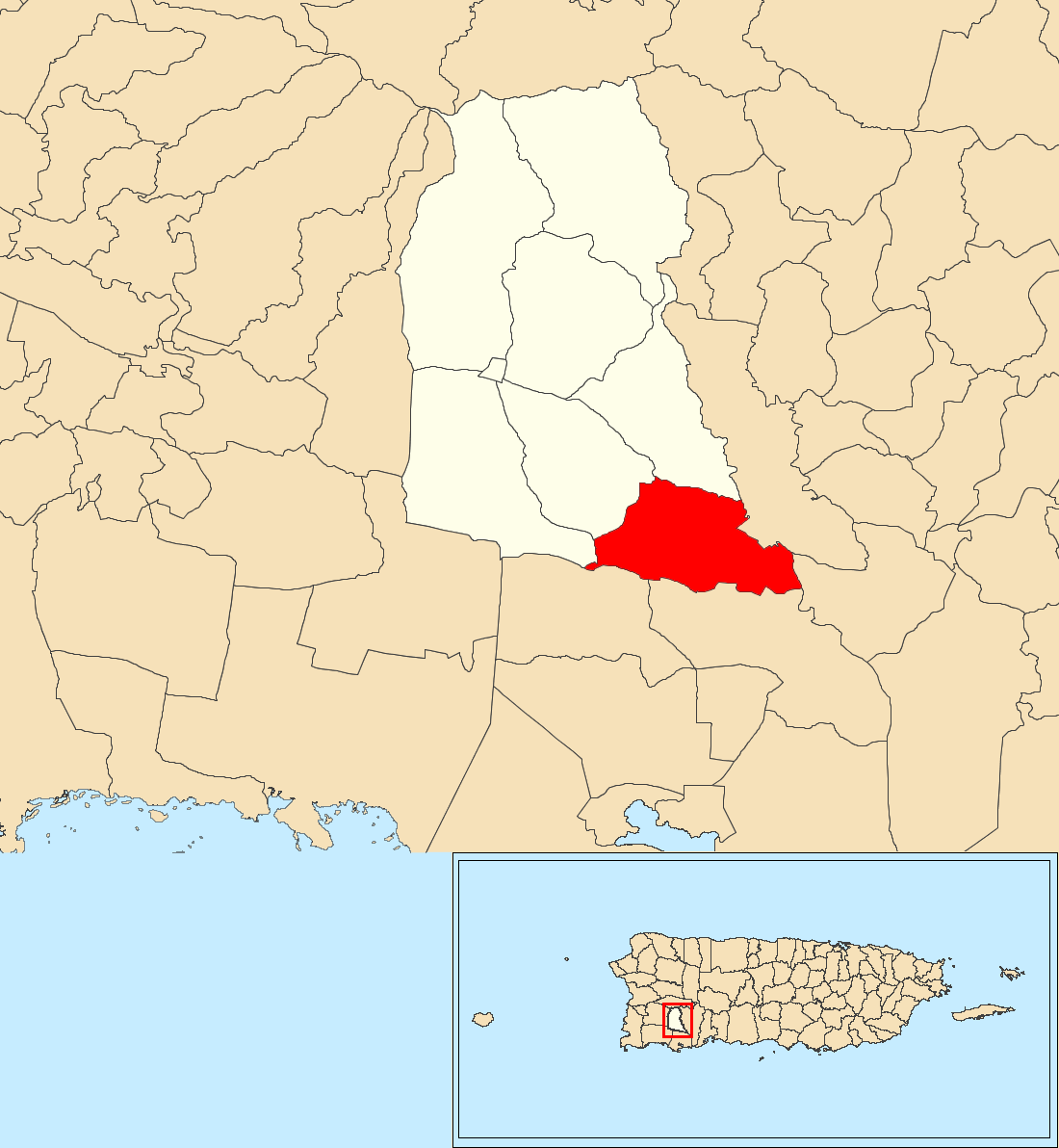
- Location of Susúa within the municipality of Sabana Grande shown in red

- Location of Puerto Rico
- Coordinates: 18°02′12″N 66°54′35″W
- Commonwealth: Puerto Rico
- Municipality: Sabana Grande

Area
  - Total: 3.98 sq mi (10.3 km^{2})
  - Land: 3.98 sq mi (10.3 km^{2})
  - Water: 0 sq mi (0 km^{2})
- Elevation: 226 ft (69 m)

Population (2010)
  - Total: 2,736
  - Density: 665.7/sq mi (257.0/km^{2})
- Source: 2010 Census
- Time zone: UTC−4 (AST)

Susúa is a barrio in the municipality of Sabana Grande, Puerto Rico. Its population in 2010 was 2,736.

== History ==
Susúa was in Spain's gazetteers until Puerto Rico was ceded by Spain in the aftermath of the Spanish–American War under the terms of the Treaty of Paris of 1898 and became an unincorporated territory of the United States. In 1899, the United States Department of War conducted a census of Puerto Rico finding that the population of Susúa and Torre barrios was 1,755.

Historical population
Census	Pop.	Note	%±
1910	1,132		—
1920	862		−23.9%
1930	755		−12.4%
1940	949		25.7%
1950	1,468		54.7%
1960	1,992		35.7%
1970	2,057		3.3%
1980	2,264		10.1%
1990	2,353		3.9%
2000	2,861		21.6%
2010	2,736		−4.4%
U.S. Decennial Census; 1899 (shown as 1900) 1910-1930; 1930-1950 1980-2000 2010

== See also ==
- List of communities in Puerto Rico
