= Torre Fundadores =

Torre Fundadores (The Ivy)

General information
- Status: Proposed
- Type: Mixed use
- Location: Monterrey, Mexico
- Construction started: 2009
- Completed: 2012
- Cost: $160,000,000 MM USD (est)
- Owner: CIM Group (LA)

Height
- Roof: 300 m (980 ft)

Technical details
- Floor count: 60
- Floor area: 60,000 m^{2} (650,000 sq ft)
- Lifts/elevators: 20

Design and construction
- Architects: Enrique Norten (Enrique Norten Arquitectos) / David Rockwell (The Rockwell Group)
- Developer: Orange Investments
- Structural engineer: Hightech Services
- Main contractor: TBD

Torre Fundadores (now known as The Ivy) was a planned project for a construction of the tallest skyscraper in Monterrey, Mexico. Even though the location and height of the tower were already planned and drafted, the project was never implemented (due to non-approval of the local authorities).

== Interesting Facts ==
- Torre Fundadores (now The Ivy) will actually be a pair of towers arising from a common base building. The shorter tower was planned in a standard, rectangular efficient shape (office towers).
- The taller tower was more architecturally unique, appearing as a twisted tower narrowing toward the top. The design does not call for significant spires or antennae. The building would contain 23,000 m^{2} (250,000 sq ft) of office space class AAA and 10,000 m^{2} (110,000 sq ft) of retail space.
- The remainder will consist of 236 luxury residences and a boutique hotel composed of over 150 rooms. The tower will also feature an underground parking garage with a capacity of 2,000 vehicles.
- The project was never complete, even though it was estimated to be the tallest building in the area, and it was estimated to take 3 years to construct. The main contractor was never mentioned, but the developer is known to be Orange Investments, a company that specializes in business- and financial strategies of real estate.
- The location was set at the upscale Valle Oriente sector.
- When complete, it will be the tallest building in the Monterrey area and, depending upon exact final height and definition being used, could challenge the Torre Bicentenario as the tallest building in Mexico. Torre Fundadores will be a mixed-use project, providing retail, commercial office, hotel and residential space. While detailed plans for the edifice exist, the project has yet to be approved by local authorities.
- Interestingly, there is also a Hospital in Medellín, Colombia, under the same name as the Torre Fundadores.
