= Hacienda San Francisco =

Sugar mill complex in Sabana Grande, Puerto Rico

- U.S. National Register of Historic Places
- Puerto Rico Historic Sites and Zones
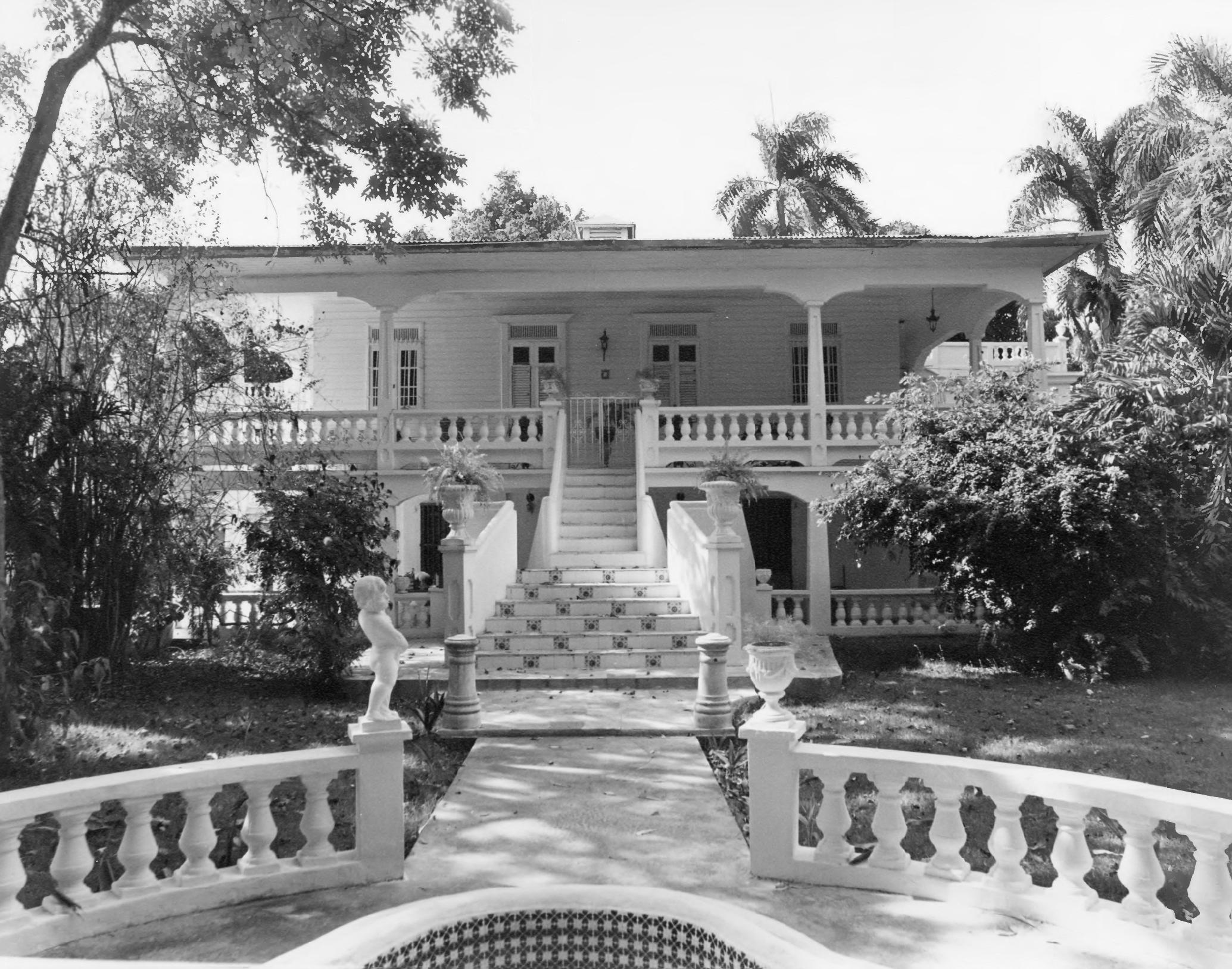
- Hacienda San Francisco in 1991

- Location within Puerto Rico
- Nearest city: Sabana Grande, Puerto Rico
- Coordinates: 18°4′40″N 66°57′46″W
- Area: less than one acre
- Built: 1871
- NRHP reference No.: 95000287
- RNSZH No.: 2000-(RO)-19-JP-SH

Significant dates
- Added to NRHP: April 7, 1995
- Designated RNSZH: December 21, 2000

Hacienda San Francisco, also known as Hacienda Quilichini, is a sugar mill complex with hacienda house that was listed on the U.S. National Register of Historic Places in 1995 and on the Puerto Rico Register of Historic Sites and Zones in 2000. The sugar mill was built in 1871. The hacienda house and a mill are regarded as contributing buildings; there are also a kitchen, a shed, a water tower, and some other buildings.
