= Rincón, Sabana Grande, Puerto Rico =

Barrio of Puerto Rico

Rincón
- Barrio
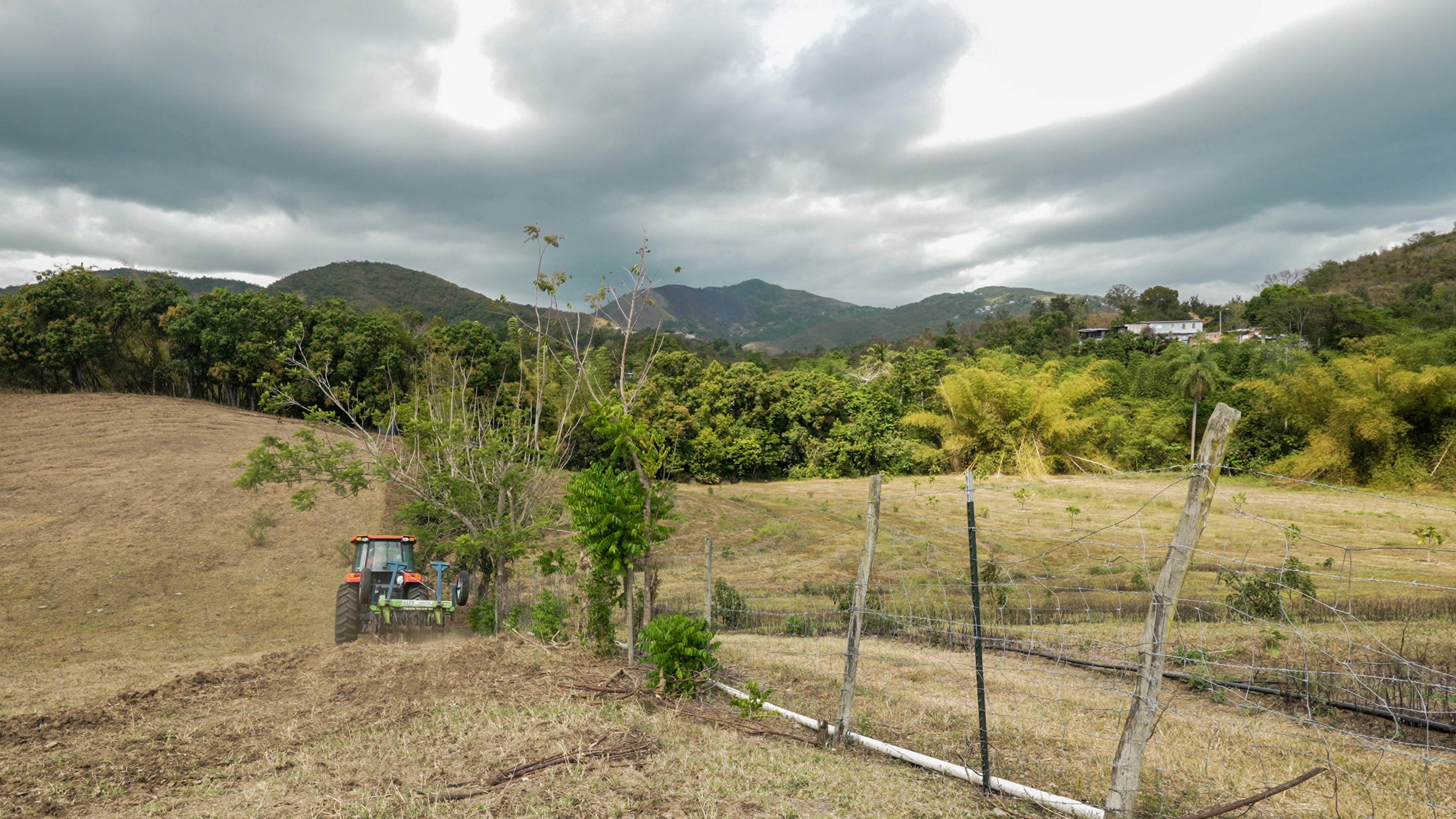
- Farm in Rincón

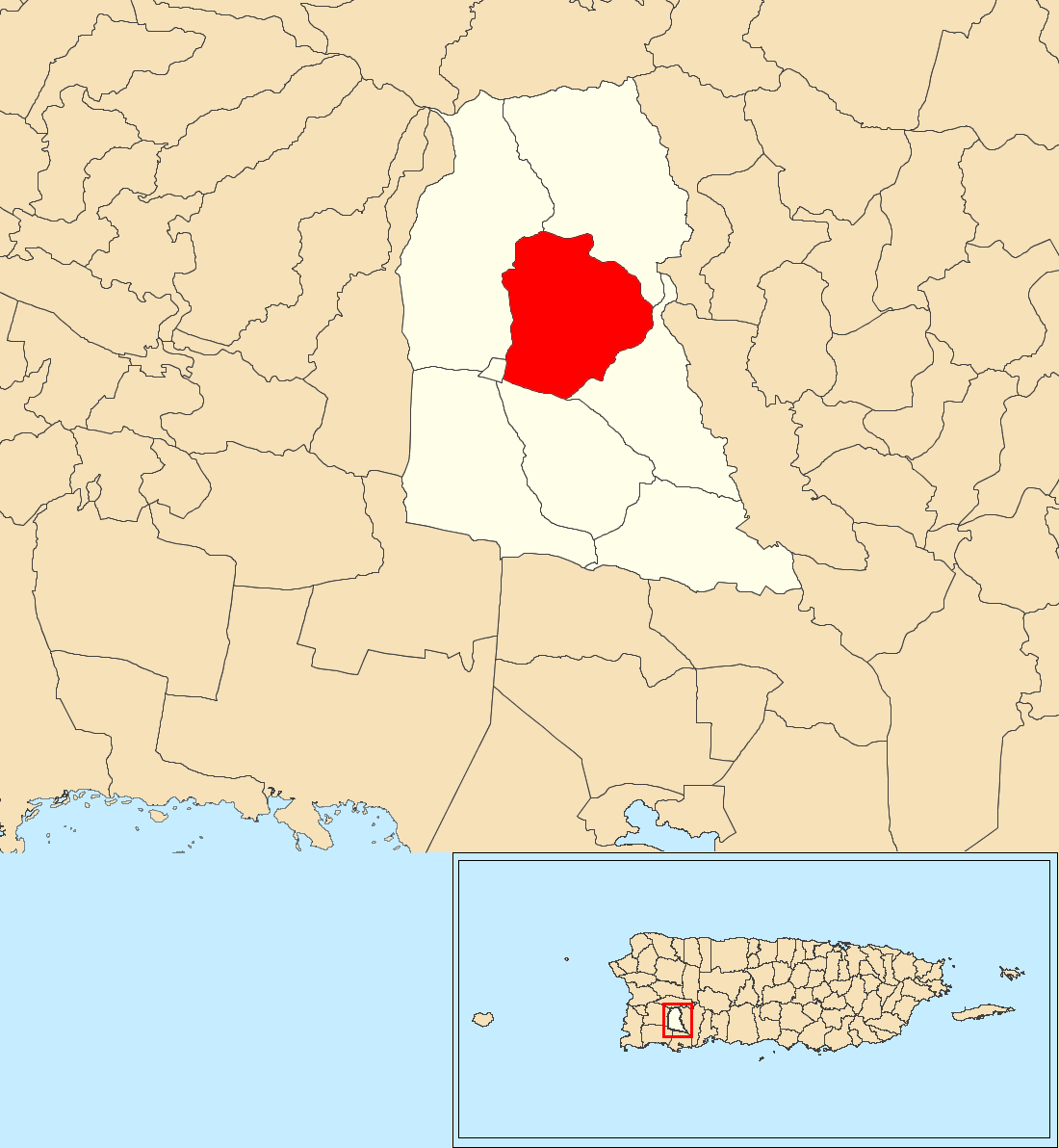
- Location of Rincón within the municipality of Sabana Grande shown in red

- Location of Puerto Rico
- Coordinates: 18°05′19″N 66°56′37″W
- Commonwealth: Puerto Rico
- Municipality: Sabana Grande

Area
  - Total: 4.87 sq mi (12.6 km^{2})
  - Land: 4.87 sq mi (12.6 km^{2})
  - Water: 0 sq mi (0 km^{2})
- Elevation: 469 ft (143 m)

Population (2010)
  - Total: 3,450
  - Density: 708.4/sq mi (273.5/km^{2})
- Source: 2010 Census
- Time zone: UTC−4 (AST)

Rincón or Rincón Pozo is a barrio in the municipality of Sabana Grande, Puerto Rico. Its population in 2010 was 3,450.

== History ==
Rincón was in Spain's gazetteers until Puerto Rico was ceded by Spain in the aftermath of the Spanish–American War under the terms of the Treaty of Paris of 1898 and became an unincorporated territory of the United States. In 1899, the United States Department of War conducted a census of Puerto Rico finding that the population of Rincón barrio was 1,244.

Historical population
Census	Pop.	Note	%±
1900	1,244		—
1910	1,257		1.0%
1920	1,239		−1.4%
1930	1,029		−16.9%
1940	1,292		25.6%
1950	1,356		5.0%
1960	1,805		33.1%
1970	0		−100.0%
1980	2,964		—
1990	3,124		5.4%
2000	3,997		27.9%
2010	3,450		−13.7%
U.S. Decennial Census; 1899 (shown as 1900) 1910-1930; 1930-1950 1980-2000 2010

In 1953, three school children claimed to have seen an apparition of the Virgen Mary in Rincón, Sabana Grande. The incident was investigated by the Catholic Church, however, the church did not find evidence to corroborate the event. Still 37 years later, thousands of Catholics went to the location to venerate Our Lady of the Rosary.

== See also ==
- List of communities in Puerto Rico
