= Las Torres (disambiguation) =

Grand Hotel Tijuana, otherwise known as Las Torres, is a high-rise complex of twin skyscrapers in Tijuana, Mexico.

Las Torres may also refer to:

- Las Torres de Cotillas, a municipality in Murcia, Spain
- Las Torres metro station, in Santiago, Chile
- Las Torres (Mexibús, Line 1), a BRT station in Ecatepec, State of Mexico
- Las Torres (Mexibús, Line 3), a BRT station in Nezahualcóyotl, State of Mexico
- Las Torres light rail station, a light rail station in Mexico City
- Las Torres, a Medellín Metro station

== See also ==
- Torres (disambiguation)
