= Sabana Grande, Puerto Rico =

Town and municipality in Puerto Rico

Sabana Grande Municipio de Sabana Grande
- Town and Municipality
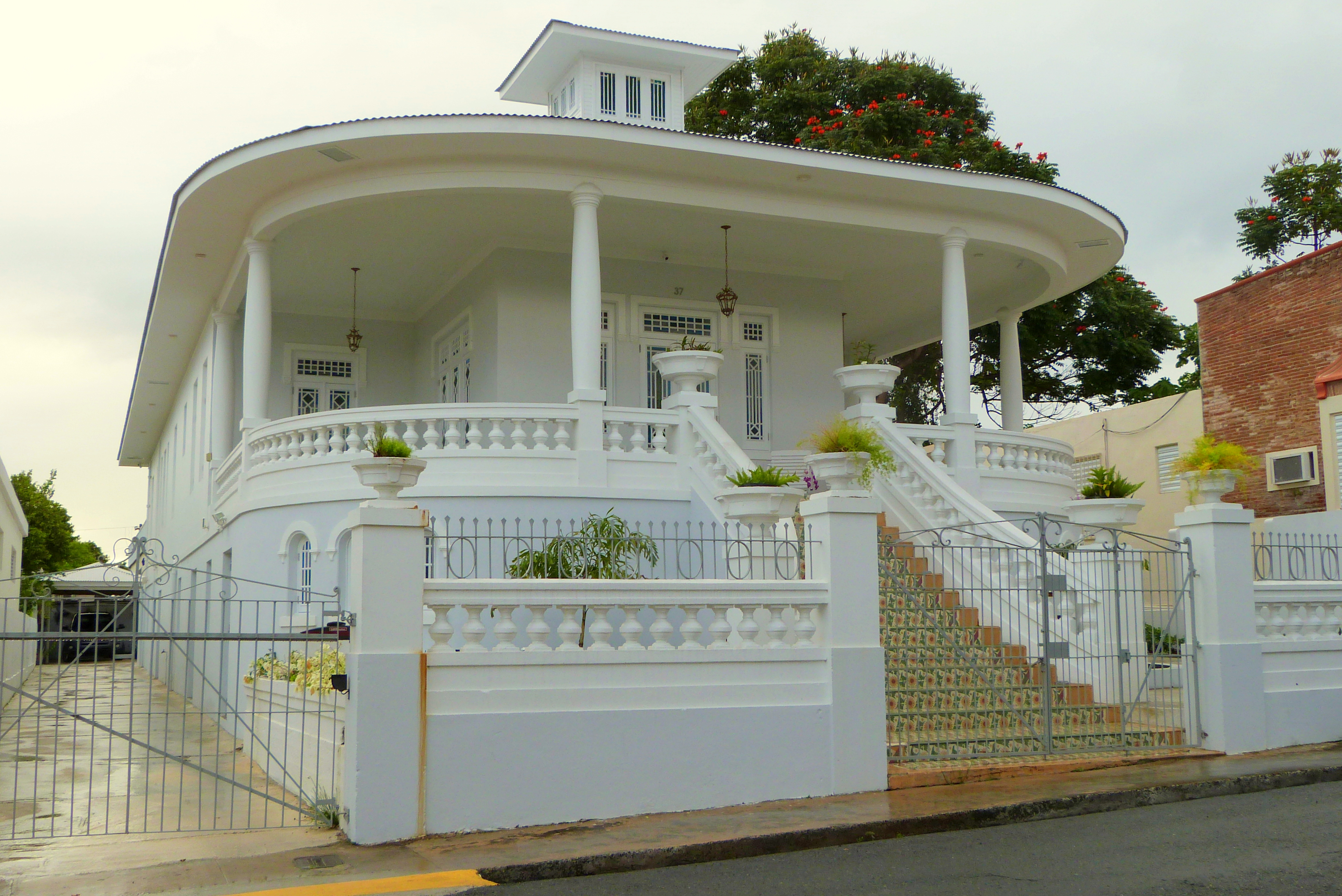
- The historic Berta Sepúlveda House in Sabana Grande

- Flag Coat of arms
- Nicknames: "La Ciudad de los Petateros", "El Pueblo de los Prodigios" ("Town of Prodigies")
- Anthem: "Sabana Grande, ciudad petatera"
- Map of Puerto Rico highlighting Sabana Grande Municipality
- Coordinates: 18°4′47″N 66°57′39″W
- Sovereign state: United States
- Commonwealth: Puerto Rico
- Settled: 1776
- Founded: January 4, 1895
- Founder: Don Juan de la Torre
- Barrios: 8 barrios: Machuchal; Rayo; Rincón; Sabana Grande barrio-pueblo; Santana; Susúa; Tabonuco; Torre

Government
  - Mayor: Marcos Valentin (PPD)
  - Senatorial dist.: 5 - Ponce
  - Representative dist.: 21

Area
  - Total: 37 sq mi (96 km^{2})
  - Land: 37 sq mi (96 km^{2})
  - Water: 0 sq mi (0.0 km^{2})

Population (2020)
  - Total: 22,729
  - Estimate (2025): 22,055 ▼
  - Rank: 55th in Puerto Rico
  - Density: 610/sq mi (240/km^{2})
- Demonym: Sabaneños
- Time zone: UTC−4 (AST)
- ZIP Code: 00637
- Area code: 787/939

Sabana Grande (Spanish pronunciation: [saˈβana ˈɣɾande]) is a town and municipality of Puerto Rico located north of Lajas and Guánica; south of Maricao; east of San Germán; and west of Yauco. Sabana Grande is spread over seven barrios and Sabana Grande Pueblo (the downtown area and the administrative center of the city). It is part of the San Germán-Cabo Rojo Metropolitan Statistical Area.

== History ==
The municipality's name comes from the extensive plain that occupies the southern part of the municipality which extends towards the west to San German and Hormigueros, better known as the Sabana Grande Valley (Spanish for the big savanna valley; the word sabana and the English savanna both come from the Taino word for plains). According to historian Mario Villar Roces, before 1808 there was a community with its own church on the land today known as Sabana Grande Arriba (literally upper great savanna). Evidence of this is the oldest baptismal registry preserved from the area, as Sabana Grande was originally a sector of the municipality of San Germán.

Because the community was so far from the center of San Germán, residents felt a need to build a church, which was established as an auxiliary to the San Germán parish. The church was built and was devoted to San Isidro Labrador and Santa María de la Cabeza.

During Spanish rule, in order for a town to be established, the following had to take place: A group of vecinos ("neighbors" or residents) that wanted to found a town had to grant a power of attorney to one or more other vecinos to represent them before the governor and viceroy. This person could authorize the founding of the town and the establishment of a parish. The grantors of the power of attorney had to be a majority in the given territory and more than ten in number. Once the case had been made, the governor appointed a "capitán poblador" or settlement official to represent the vecinos and one or more delegates, who usually lived in nearby aldeas, or hamlets. Proof was required that the settlement was so far from a church that it was very difficult for the settlers to partake of sacraments and municipal services. In general, proof was provided of the absence or bad condition of roads and bridges. If the petition was approved, it was required that the vecinos mark off the new municipality and build public works such as a church, a parish house, a government house (Casa del Rey), a slaughterhouse, and a cemetery, and to set aside land for the town square or plaza and the commons (ejidos). The vecinos were expected to cover the cost of building these works by levying special assessments. Usually one of the land owners donated some land for the founding. Once the requirements had been met, the governor authorized the founding of the town and the parish, and he appointed a Lieutenant at War who usually was the same capitán poblador.

There is some debate as to when Sabana Grande was founded. Some say that it was established in 1808, while others say it was established in 1813, a year after the town was politically established in 1812. Historian Villar Roces posits that although the exact date of the founding of the town is not found in any document in the municipal archives, 1813 should be considered the year it was legally founded because it coincides with the date of the first registry document. In entry number 23 in the third book of marriages, dated July 1, 1813, the priest is identified as "Priest Ecónomo of the Sabana Grande Parish Church," while previous entries were called "Attending Priests" or "Coadjutants of the Villa of San Germán."

Sabana Grande became an independent parish, under its own jurisdiction, in June 1813, with the first parish priest of the San Isidro Labrador y Santa María de la Cabeza Church being Martín Antonio Borreli.

On December 21, 1814, the first captain general of Sabana Grande, Pedro de Acosta, took office. Some local historians assert that he donated seventy cuerdas of land where the Kings House, priests house, a plaza, a butcher shop and a cemetery were established. Others say that this land was donated by Joaquín P. Rodríguez de la Seda y Almodóvar. Villar Roces adds that Juan Francisco de Acosta, brother of the mayor and parish priest of Sabana Grande, donated his house to the town so it could be used as the Kings House or council house.

The first families of Sabana Grande were the Vélez Borrero, García Almodóvar, Nazario de Figueroa, Acosta, Sanabria, Lugo, Rivera, Sepúlveda, del Toro, Montalvo, Irizarry, Borreli, Ramírez, Torres, Matos, Pabón-Dávila, Quiñones, Rodríguez de la Renta, Soltero, Segarra, Ortiz de la Renta, Ortiz de Peña, Saavedra and others. Also, Catalan families with the surnames of Busigó, Malaret and Serra, and a group of Greek immigrants with the surname Soto, all settled in the town from the time of its founding.

Hurricane Maria on September 20, 2017 triggered numerous landslides in Sabana Grande with the significant amount of rainfall.

== Geography ==
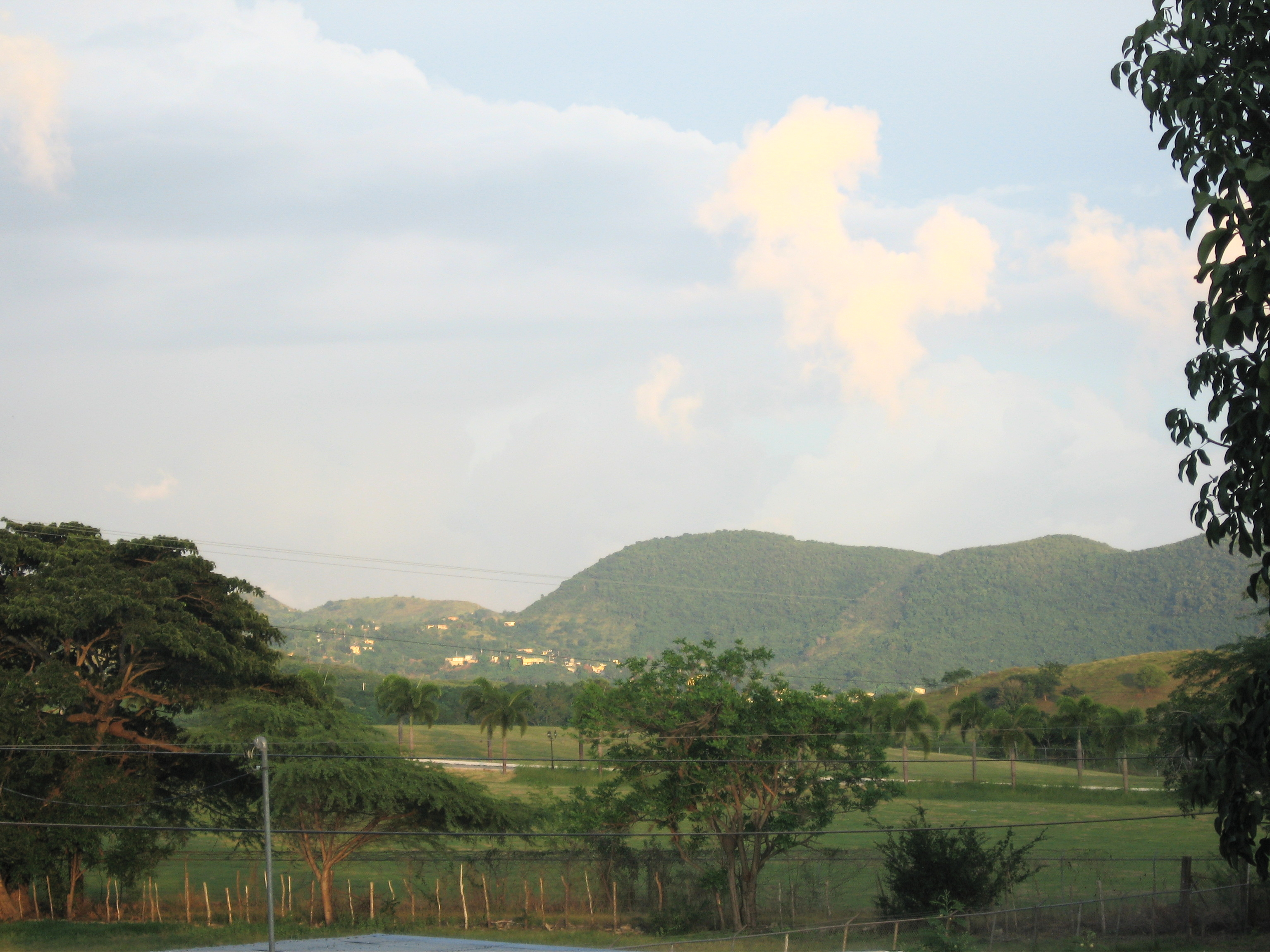
Lajas Valley, November 2006

Sabana Grande is on the south west side of Puerto Rico, in the Lajas Valley. There are a number of rivers there: Río Guanajibo and its tributaries, Coco River, Flores River, and Río Grande. The highest point in Sabana Grande is an unnamed peak of the western Cordillera Central that rises to 2,963.3 feet (903 m), located on the municipal boundary with Maricao, within the Monte del Estado massif.

=== Barrios ===
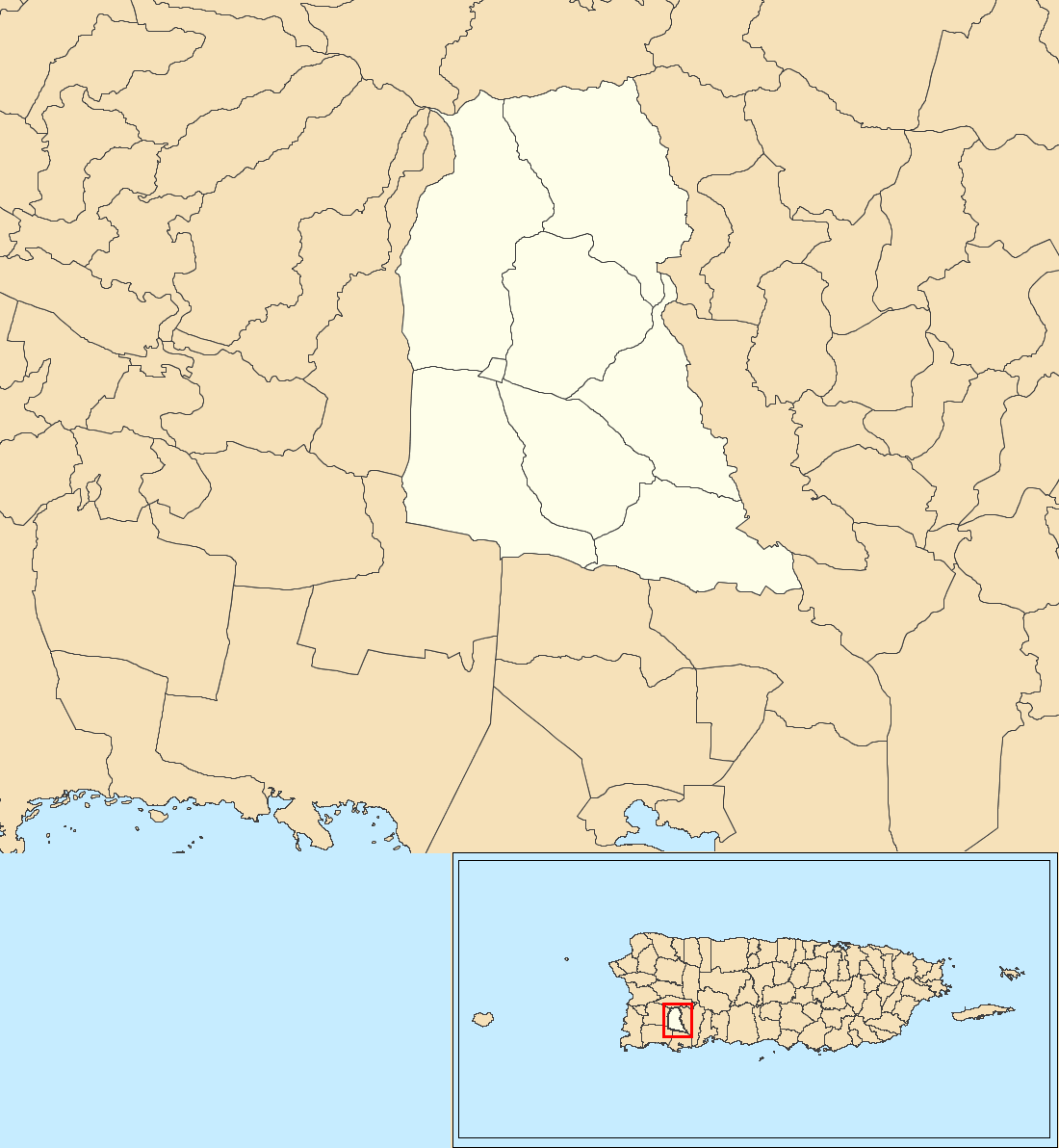
Subdivisions of Sabana Grande.

Like all municipalities of Puerto Rico, Sabana Grande is subdivided into barrios. The municipal buildings, central square and large Catholic church are located in a barrio referred to as "el pueblo".

1. Machuchal
2. Rayo
3. Rincón
4. Sabana Grande barrio-pueblo
5. Santana
6. Susúa
7. Tabonuco
8. Torre

=== Sectors ===
Barrios (which are like minor civil divisions) and subbarrios, are further subdivided into smaller areas called sectores (sectors in English). The types of sectores may vary, from normally sector to urbanización to reparto to barriada to residencial, among others.

=== Special Communities ===
Comunidades Especiales de Puerto Rico (Special Communities of Puerto Rico) are marginalized communities whose citizens are experiencing a certain amount of social exclusion. A map shows these communities occur in nearly every municipality of the commonwealth. Of the 742 places that were on the list in 2014, the following barrios, communities, sectors, or neighborhoods were in Sabana Grande: Santana, Cerro Gordo, El Burén, Molinas and Susúa.

== Economy ==
=== Agriculture ===
Fruits, sugar and cattle on a small scale.

== Demographics ==
Historical population
| Census | Pop. | Note | %± |
|---|---|---|---|
| 1900 | 10,560 | | — |
| 1910 | 11,523 | | 9.1% |
| 1920 | 12,305 | | 6.8% |
| 1930 | 11,881 | | −3.4% |
| 1940 | 14,146 | | 19.1% |
| 1950 | 16,097 | | 13.8% |
| 1960 | 15,910 | | −1.2% |
| 1970 | 16,343 | | 2.7% |
| 1980 | 20,207 | | 23.6% |
| 1990 | 22,843 | | 13.0% |
| 2000 | 25,935 | | 13.5% |
| 2010 | 25,265 | | −2.6% |
| 2020 | 22,729 | | −10.0% |
| 2025 (est.) | 22,055 | ▼ | −3.0% |
U.S. Decennial Census; 1899 (shown as 1900) 1910-1930; 1930-1950 1960-2000 2010 2020

== Tourism ==
=== Landmarks and places of interest ===
The following are some of the well-known places of interest in Sabana Grande:

- San Francisco Estate, in Spanish: Hacienda San Francisco, also known as Hacienda Quilinchini, is a historic sugar mill complex with an hacienda house, which is listed on the National Register of Historic Places.
- Museum of Art, within City Hall
- The Sanctuary of the Virgin of the Rosary of the Well, El Pozo de la Virgen, a Catholic mission with millions of members in twenty countries
- Susúa State Forest
- Barco House Casa Barco
- Orlando López Recreational Center
- Igualdad Lodge #23
- Masonic Cemetery, Cementerio Masónico de Ia Resp. Logia Igualdad Num. 23 de Sabana Grande, is of countrywide significance under Criterion A in the area of Social History as the property is associated with a very important pattern of social and political events that took place during the nineteenth century in Puerto Rico. The construction of the cemetery came out as a result of the struggles among the Spanish political establishment and its ideological partner, the Roman Catholic Church, against the presence of the philosophical brotherhood commonly known as the Freemasons.
- Placita de la Recordación

== Culture ==
=== Festivals and events ===
Sabana Grande celebrates its patron saint festival in May. The Fiestas Patronales de San Isidro Labrador is a religious and cultural celebration that generally features parades, games, artisans, amusement rides, regional food, and live entertainment.

Other festivals and events celebrated in Sabana Grande include:

- Virgen del Pozo Marathon – May
- Inter-organizational Carnival – April
- Soberao Jazz Festival – April
- Petate Festival – December
- Burén Corn Fritter Festival – December
- Troubadour Festival – December
- Three Kings Festival – January
- Grand Petate Festival – February

== Government ==
Like all municipalities in Puerto Rico, Sabana Grande is administered by a mayor. The current mayor of Sabana Grande is Marcos Gilberto Valentin Flores, from the Popular Democratic Party (PPD). He was first elected at the 2020 general election.

The city belongs to the Puerto Rico Senatorial district V, which is represented by two Senators. In 2024, Marially González Huertas and Jamie Barlucea, from the Popular Democratic Party and New Progressive Party, respectively, were elected as District Senators.

== Transportation ==
There are 27 bridges in Sabana Grande.

The main highways in Sabana Grande are PR-2, PR-120, PR-121, PR-102 and PR-117. In 2020, a section of PR-368, from downtown Sabana Grande to Yauco, was named Fidel Vélez Vélez.

== Symbols ==
The municipio has an official flag and coat of arms.

=== Flag ===
The flag of Sabana Grande has four squares, two green and two yellow, alternating. In the center is the municipal coat of arms. The meaning of the flag comes from the coat of arms.

=== Coat of arms ===
The municipality's coat of arms contains the elements that represent the town's patron saints. The shovel and rake allude to San Isidro Labrador. It is believed this representation arose from the faith of the workers in the Sabana Grande countryside. When a bad drought came, they made promises in the hopes that their patron saint would save their crops. The urn represents the domestic tasks of Santa María de la Cabeza, the wife of San Isidro.

In the center is the leaf of the petate palm as an icon of a traditional industry of Sabana Grande. Above is the crown wall which, as a symbol of solidarity, civic unity and common defense, is a heraldic tribute that is part of the coat of arms of towns. The motto on the coat of arms is "Town of the Prodigies."

== Education ==
Sabana Grande boasts several public and private schools within its territory. Public education is handled by the Puerto Rico Department of Education.

Some of the local schools are:

- Jose A. Castillo Elementary
- Jose Celso Barbosa Elementary
- Rosendo Matienzo Cintron Elementary
- Francisco Vazquez Puello Elementary
- David Antorgiorgi Cordova Elementary and Middle School
- Juan I. Vega Elementary and Middle School
- Blanca Malaret Middle School
- Luis Negron Lopez High School
- Jose R Gaztambide Elementary

Private:

- The Academy of Saint Agustin and the Holy Spirit
- Santa Ana Bilingual School
- Christian Academy
- Baptist Academy
- Seventh-Day Adventist Academy

== Notable Sabaneños ==
- Luis Negrón López (politics)
- Santos Colón (singer)
- Félix Rigau Carrera - First Puerto Rican pilot and the first pilot to fly on air mail carrying duties in Puerto Rico.
- Aníbal González Irizarry educator, journalist and news broadcaster
- Adalberto Rodríguez "Machuchal" (Comedian)
- Fidel Vélez Vélez (Patriot) (Intentona de Yauco)
- John Ruiz (boxing-First Hispanic Heavyweight World Champion)
- Asaradel Musician (Godless) Black Metal band.
- Jose Vidro MLB All-Star
- Jonathan Sánchez MLB Pitcher, No Hitter, World Series Champion

== See also ==
- List of Puerto Ricans
- History of Puerto Rico
- National Register of Historic Places listings in Sabana Grande, Puerto Rico
- Did you know-Puerto Rico?
