= Crystal Tower =

Crystal Tower may refer to:

- Crystal Tower (Dubai), a building in Dubai City
- Crystal Tower (Amsterdam), a 95 meter high rise in Amsterdam
- Crystal Tower (Kuwait City), a 52-story skyscraper in Kuwait City
- Crystal Tower (Osaka), a 37-story skyscraper in Osaka Business Park
- Crystal Tower (Porto Alegre), a tower of Barra Shopping Sul

== See also ==
- Torre de Cristal (disambiguation) (Portuguese and Spanish for Crystal Tower)
