= Torres =

Torres may refer to:

== People ==
- Torres (surname), a Spanish, Portuguese and Moroccan surname
- Torres (musician), singer-songwriter Mackenzie Scott
  - Torres (album), 2013 self-titled album by Torres

== Places ==
=== Americas ===
- Torres, Colorado, an unincorporated community
- Torres, Rio Grande do Sul, a city in the state of Rio Grande do Sul in Brazil
- Torres, Riverside County, California, Cahuilla village site in California
- Torres Municipality, Lara, Venezuela
- Torres del Paine, a mountain group in Torres del Paine National Park in the Patagonia region of Chile
- Torres, Buenos Aires, a town in Argentina

=== Europe ===
- Porto Torres, a commune and city in the Sassari province of Sardinia (Italy)
- Torres Novas, a municipality in the Santarém district of Portugal
- Torres Vedras, a city and a municipality in the Lisbon district of Portugal
- Logudoro/Torres, historical region, Sardinia, Italy

==== Spain ====
- Torres, Jaén, a municipality in the province of Jaén, Andalusia
- Torres de Albánchez, a municipality in the province of Jaén
- Torres Torres, a municipality in the province of Valencia
- Torres de la Alameda, a municipality in the province of Madrid
- Torres de Albarracín, a municipality in the province of Teruel, Aragón
- Torres de Alcanadre, a municipality in the province of Huesca, Aragon
- Torres de Barbués, a municipality in the province of Huesca
- Torres de Berrellén, a municipality in the province of Zaragoza, Aragon
- Torres del Carrizal, a municipality in the province of Zamora
- Torres del Río, a municipality in Navarre
- Torres de Segre, a municipality in the province of Lleida, Catalonia
- Las Torres de Cotillas, a municipality in Murcia
- Dos Torres, a municipality in the province of Córdoba

=== Oceania ===
- Torres Islands, in the Torba province of Vanuatu
- Torres Strait, a body of water between Australia and the island of New Guinea
- Shire of Torres, a shire in Australia

=== Africa ===
- Torres Castle, a castle in Morocco

== Other uses ==
- Torres (board game)
- Bodegas Torres, a Spanish winery
- Torres Strait Island languages, three unrelated languages of northern Australia
- Lo-Toga language, also known as Torres, a language of Vanuatu
- S.E.F. Torres 1903, men's football club from Sardinia
- Torres Calcio Femminile, women's football club from Sardinia
- KGM Torres, a sport utility vehicle
- Torres, a minor character in the TV series Rimba Racer

== See also ==
- Torre (disambiguation)
- Las Torres (disambiguation)
