= Grande River (Sabana Grande, Puerto Rico) =

River of Puerto Rico

Coordinates: 18.0702395°N 66.9546214°W

Río Grande

Location
- Commonwealth: Puerto Rico
- Region: Sabana Grande

The Río Grande is a river of Puerto Rico.

== See also ==
- List of rivers of Puerto Rico
