= Torre de Cristal (disambiguation) =

Torre de Cristal (Portuguese and Spanish for Crystal Tower) may refer to:

- Torre de Cristal, a building in Madrid (Spain).
- Torre de Cristal (Recife), a famous sculpture located in Recife (Brazil).

== See also ==
- Crystal Tower (disambiguation)
