= Torre Bicentenario II =

General information
- Status: Uncertain
- Type: Hotel, Offices, Restaurant
- Location: Mexico City, Mexico

Height
- Roof: 350 m (1,150 ft)

Technical details
- Floor count: 77
- Floor area: 350,000 m^{2} (3,800,000 sq ft)

Design and construction
- Architect: Hector Tagle
- Developer: Group Adelac

Torre Bicentenario II was a proposed skyscraper that could be built at the corner of Carretera Picacho-Ajusco and Periférico Sur, Tlalpan, in Mexico City. Proposed plans would make it the fourth tallest building in America, the tallest building in Mexico City, Latin America and surpassing Torre Mayor, the tallest building in Mexico at 225.6 m. Héctor Tagle Náder was the architect.

== Details ==
- It was planned to have a height of 350 m with 77 stories and a total area of 350,000 m^{2}.
- It was planned to be finished in 2010 for Mexico's 200th anniversary of fighting for freedom from Spain.
- Six underground levels
- It would consist of a hotel, offices and a restaurant.
- The tower would have an investment of approximately US$800 million which will be from private investment.
- The high cost of this building is due to the security measures. It would be equipped with the latest technology in seismic shock absorbers due to the high seismic activity of the area.
