= Torre Bicentenario =

Skyscraper project

Coordinates: 19°25′28.7″N 99°10′27.6″W

- Interactive map of the Torre Bicentenario area

General information
- Status: Never built
- Type: Commercial
- Location: Pedregal 24, Molino del Rey; Lomas de Chapultepec, Mexico City
- Cost: US$ 610 million
- Owner: Grupo Danhos, Pontegadea

Height
- Roof: 300 m (official) 350 m (unofficial)
- Top floor: 295 m (968 ft)

Technical details
- Floor count: 70
- Floor area: 390,000 m^{2} (4,200,000 sq ft)

Design and construction
- Architect: Rem Koolhaas
- Developer: Grupo Dhanos
- Structural engineer: Arup

The Torre Bicentenario (Bicentennial Tower) was a skyscraper project planned for construction in Mexico City. If built, at 300 meters (984 ft) tall, it would surpass the Torre Mayor as the holder of the title of Tallest Building in Mexico and same height as the highest building in Latin America. Torre Bicentenario was officially canceled, as announced by the local government and the involved investors on September 28, 2007. However, some facts indicate that the tower might be built, but not to be completed on the scheduled date.

== Name and design ==
The inauguration date was planned to be September 16, 2010, which is the day of the 200th anniversary of the Mexican War of Independence, hence the building's name. The building was designed by renowned Pritzker Prize winner Rem Koolhaas, who took inspiration from the Pyramid of Kukulkan at Chichen Itza. Of its 70 floors, about 85% were being planned for offices, and the rest to commercial public services such as restaurants, auditoriums and a convention center.

The tower would have featured an interior atrium, starting on the 15th floor and ending way up to the 40th floor. This in order to allow air and light to flow freely inside the tower and providing natural light to some inside offices. There was also a skygarden planned where the two pyramids meet.

Arup was responsible for the tower's engineering. The 300-meter tall tower would have stood on a rocky site, with a low-conductivity for seismic waves.

== Controversy ==
The Torre Bicentenario Project was controversial from the beginning because of regulations in the area that ban construction over three stages tall, as well as irregular funding and previous acts of corruption from construction companies to members of the party that governed the city at that time. Nevertheless, Mexico City's government gave the project irregular backing and made exceptions to building rules and environmental regulations for the building, whilst trying to sell it as an achievement for the city. Population in the adjoining areas showed complete opposition to the project from the start, but the government continued forward, trying to market it as an accomplishment because it would become the tallest building in Latin America. Aside from the special treatment awarded to the builders, the ban on tall structures in the area and the problems perceived by the area's resident, the Torre Bicentenario Project was also opposed by the federal agency for Culture and the Arts, INBA, which had declared (since August 13, 2007) that the building that stands on Torre Bicentenario's projected site, a petrol station known as Super Servicio Lomas which was built by architect Vladimir Kaspe in the 1940s on a revolutionary and functional model was catalogued as a building with artistic value. Another point of contention against the project came from the local administrator (Jefa Delegacional) (Borough) Miguel Hidalgo, Gabriela Cuevas because of the planned construction of an underground parking lot under part of a public park Chapultepec Park. The project was eventually cancelled.

== See also ==
- Torre Bicentenario II

== Sources ==
- "Construirán en México la torre más alta de Latinoamérica" (in Spanish). El Universal. July 23, 2007.
- "Incumple predio para Torre Bicentenario con requisito de uso de suelo" (in Spanish). El Universal. July 23, 2007.
- "Modificará GDF uso de suelo para construir Torre Bicentenario" (in Spanish). El Universal. July 23, 2007.
- "Buscará INBA impedir construcción de Torre del Bicentenario" (in Spanish). El Universal. July 23, 2007.
- "'Tiembla' la Torre Bicentenario" (in Spanish). Reforma. July 23, 2007.
