= Torre Europa =

Name Torre Europa refer to:

- Torres Europa (Torre Europa 1 to 5), complex of skyscrapers in L'Hospitalet de Llobregat, suburb of Barcelona
- Torre Europa (Madrid), skyscraper in Madrid
