= Sabana Grande barrio-pueblo =

Historical and administrative center (seat) of Sabana Grande, Puerto Rico

Sabana Grande barrio-pueblo Pueblo de Sabana Grande
- Municipality Seat
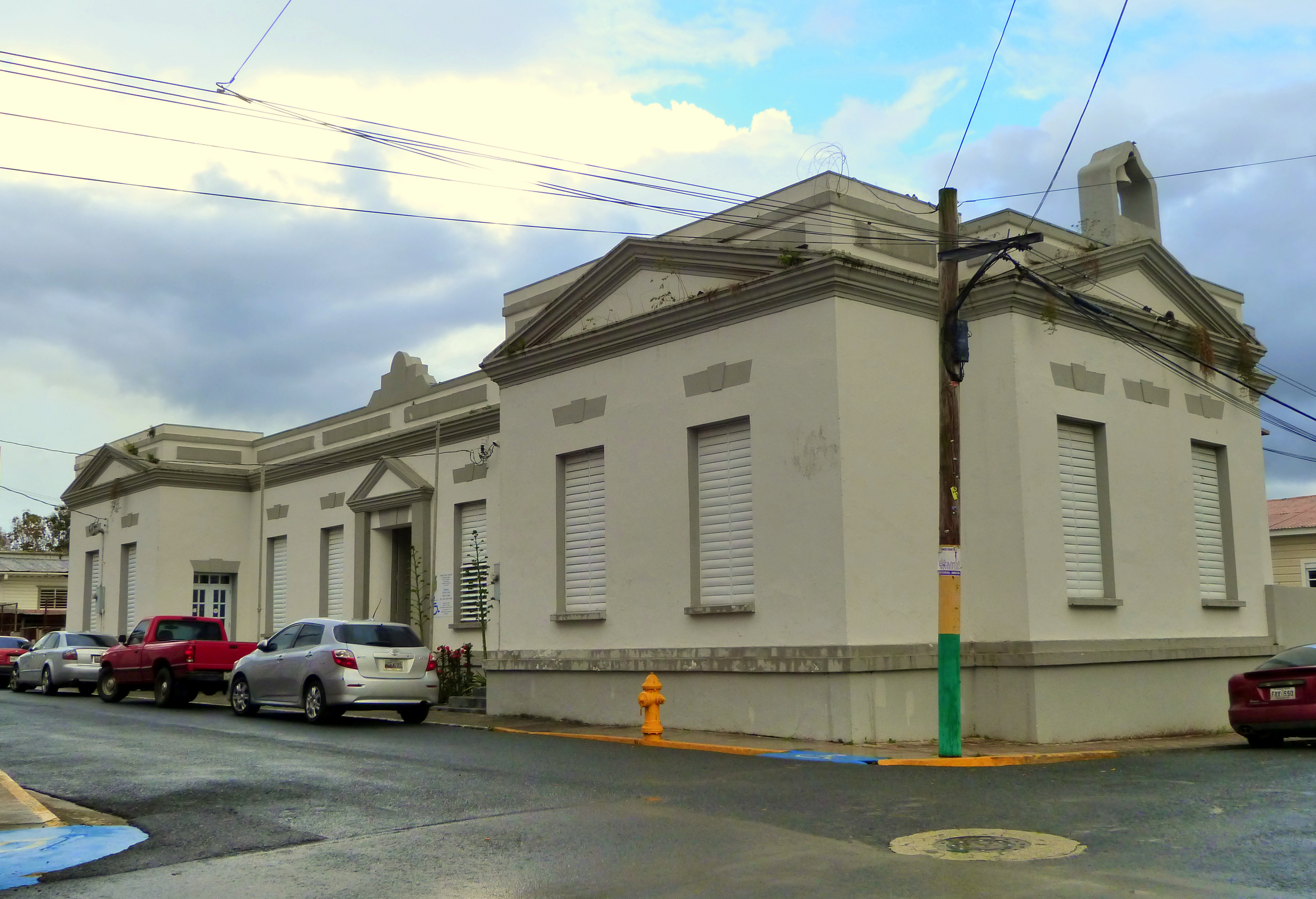
- James Fenimore Cooper School in Sabana Grande barrio-pueblo

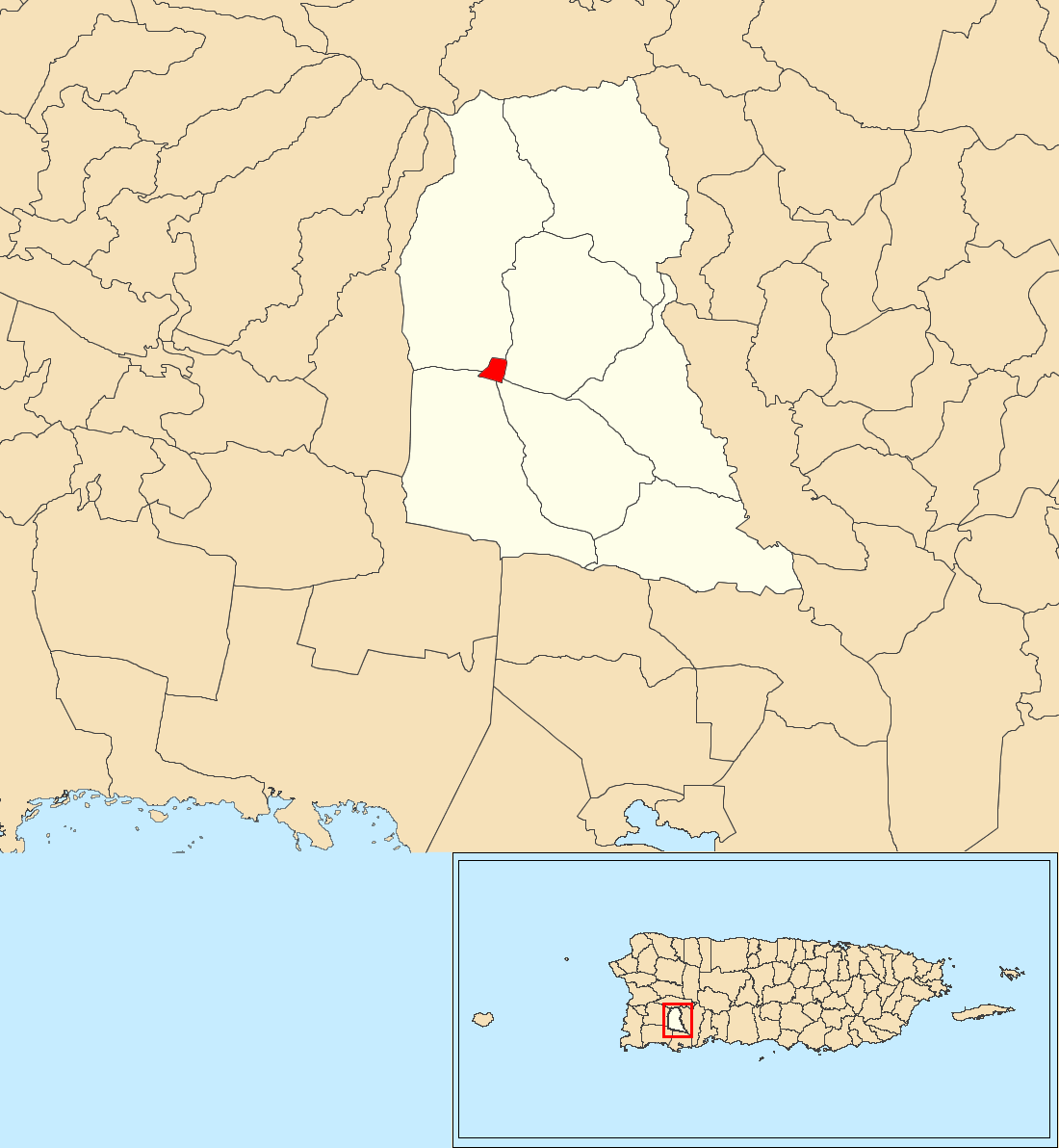
- Location of Sabana Grande barrio-pueblo within the municipality of Sabana Grande shown in red

- Location of Puerto Rico
- Coordinates: 18°04′44″N 66°57′38″W
- Commonwealth: Puerto Rico
- Municipality: Sabana Grande

Area
  - Total: 0.11 sq mi (0.28 km^{2})
  - Land: 0.11 sq mi (0.28 km^{2})
  - Water: 0 sq mi (0 km^{2})
- Elevation: 322 ft (98 m)

Population (2010)
  - Total: 1,554
  - Density: 14,127.3/sq mi (5,454.6/km^{2})
- Source: 2010 Census
- Time zone: UTC−4 (AST)

Sabana Grande barrio-pueblo is a barrio and the administrative center (seat) of Sabana Grande, a municipality of Puerto Rico. Its population in 2010 was 1,554.

As was customary in Spain, in Puerto Rico, the municipality has a barrio called pueblo which contains a central plaza, the municipal buildings (city hall), and a Catholic church. Fiestas patronales (patron saint festivals) are held in the central plaza every year.

== The central plaza and its church ==
The central plaza, or square, is a place for official and unofficial recreational events and a place where people can gather and socialize from dusk to dawn. The Laws of the Indies, Spanish law, which regulated life in Puerto Rico in the early 19th century, stated the plaza's purpose was for "the parties" (celebrations, festivities) (Spanish: a propósito para las fiestas), and that the square should be proportionally large enough for the number of neighbors (Spanish: grandeza proporcionada al número de vecinos). These Spanish regulations also stated that the streets nearby should be comfortable portals for passersby, protecting them from the elements: sun and rain.

Located across the central plaza in Sabana Grande barrio-pueblo is the Iglesia San Isidro Labrador y Santa María de la Cabeza, a Roman Catholic church.

== History ==
Sabana Grande barrio-pueblo was in Spain's gazetteers until Puerto Rico was ceded by Spain in the aftermath of the Spanish–American War under the terms of the Treaty of Paris of 1898 and became an unincorporated territory of the United States. In 1899, the United States Department of War conducted a census of Puerto Rico finding that the population of Sabana Grande Pueblo was 2,531.

In July 2020, Federal Emergency Management Agency appropriated funds for repairs to Sabana Grande's plaza.

In 2020, a section of PR-368, from downtown Sabana Grande to Yauco, was named Fidel Vélez Vélez.

Historical population
Census	Pop.	Note	%±
1900	2,531		—
1910	2,636		4.1%
1920	2,856		8.3%
1930	3,778		32.3%
1940	4,783		26.6%
1950	4,867		1.8%
1960	3,318		−31.8%
1970	0		−100.0%
1980	2,267		—
1990	2,068		−8.8%
2000	1,807		−12.6%
2010	1,554		−14.0%
U.S. Decennial Census; 1899 (shown as 1900) 1910-1930; 1930-1950 1980-2000 2010

== See also ==
- List of communities in Puerto Rico
