= Torre, Sabana Grande, Puerto Rico =

Barrio of Puerto Rico

Torre
- Barrio
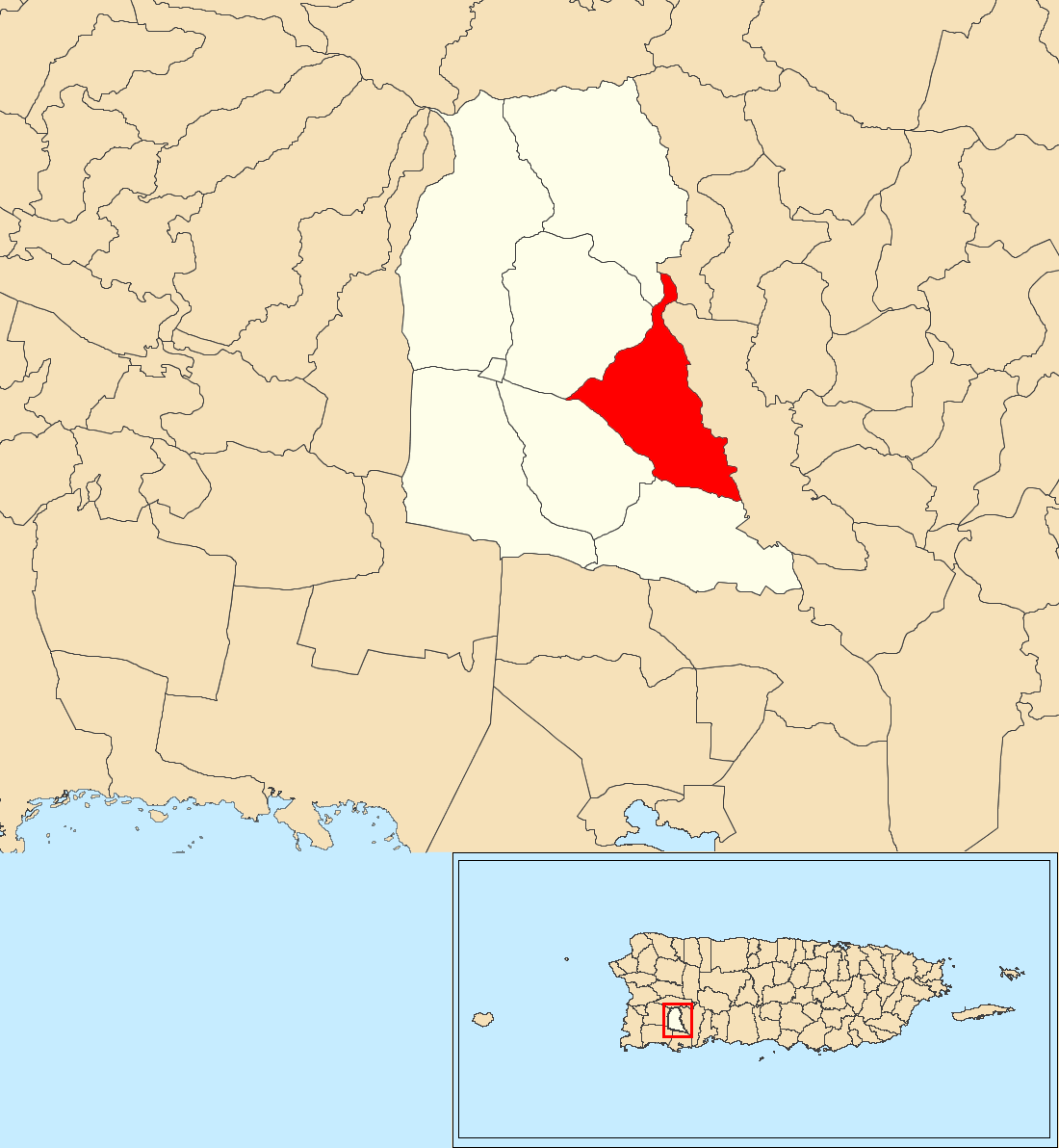
- Location of Torre within the municipality of Sabana Grande shown in red

- Location of Puerto Rico
- Coordinates: 18°03′47″N 66°55′04″W
- Commonwealth: Puerto Rico
- Municipality: Sabana Grande

Area
  - Total: 3.91 sq mi (10.1 km^{2})
  - Land: 3.91 sq mi (10.1 km^{2})
  - Water: 0 sq mi (0 km^{2})
- Elevation: 718 ft (219 m)

Population (2010)
  - Total: 2,096
  - Density: 536.1/sq mi (207.0/km^{2})
- Source: 2010 Census
- Time zone: UTC−4 (AST)

Torre is a barrio in the municipality of Sabana Grande, Puerto Rico. Its population in 2010 was 2,096.

== History ==
Torre was in Spain's gazetteers until Puerto Rico was ceded by Spain in the aftermath of the Spanish–American War under the terms of the Treaty of Paris of 1898 and became an unincorporated territory of the United States. In 1899, the United States Department of War conducted a census of Puerto Rico finding that the combined population of Torre and Susúa barrios was 1,755.

Historical population
Census	Pop.	Note	%±
1910	978		—
1920	1,025		4.8%
1930	905		−11.7%
1940	1,080		19.3%
1950	1,012		−6.3%
1960	1,093		8.0%
1970	801		−26.7%
1980	942		17.6%
1990	1,101		16.9%
2000	1,742		58.2%
2010	2,096		20.3%
U.S. Decennial Census; 1900 (N/A) 1910-1930; 1930-1950 1980-2000 2010

== See also ==
- List of communities in Puerto Rico
