= Tabonuco, Sabana Grande, Puerto Rico =

Barrio of Puerto Rico

Tabonuco
- Barrio
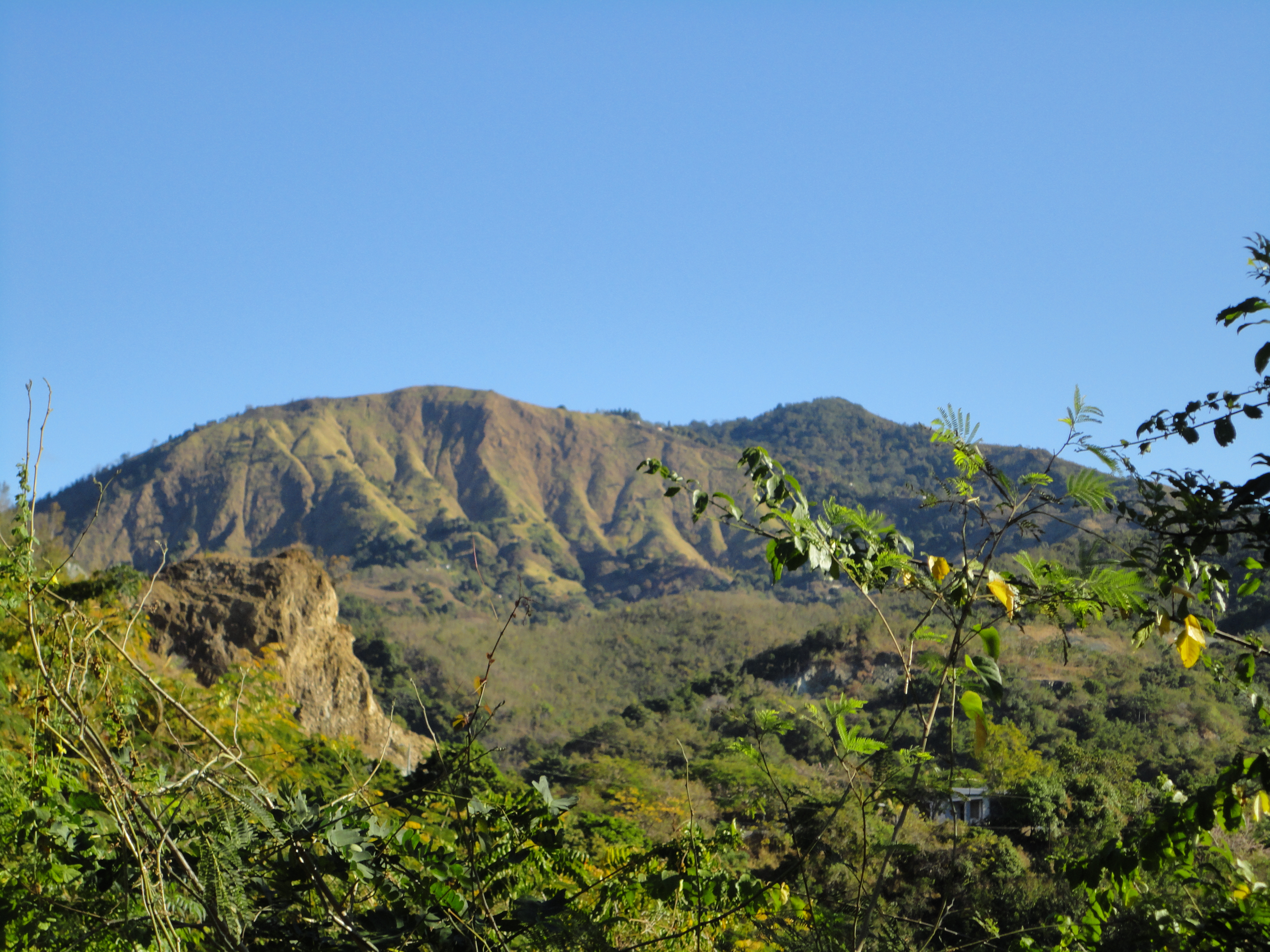
- Tabonuco in Sabana Grande

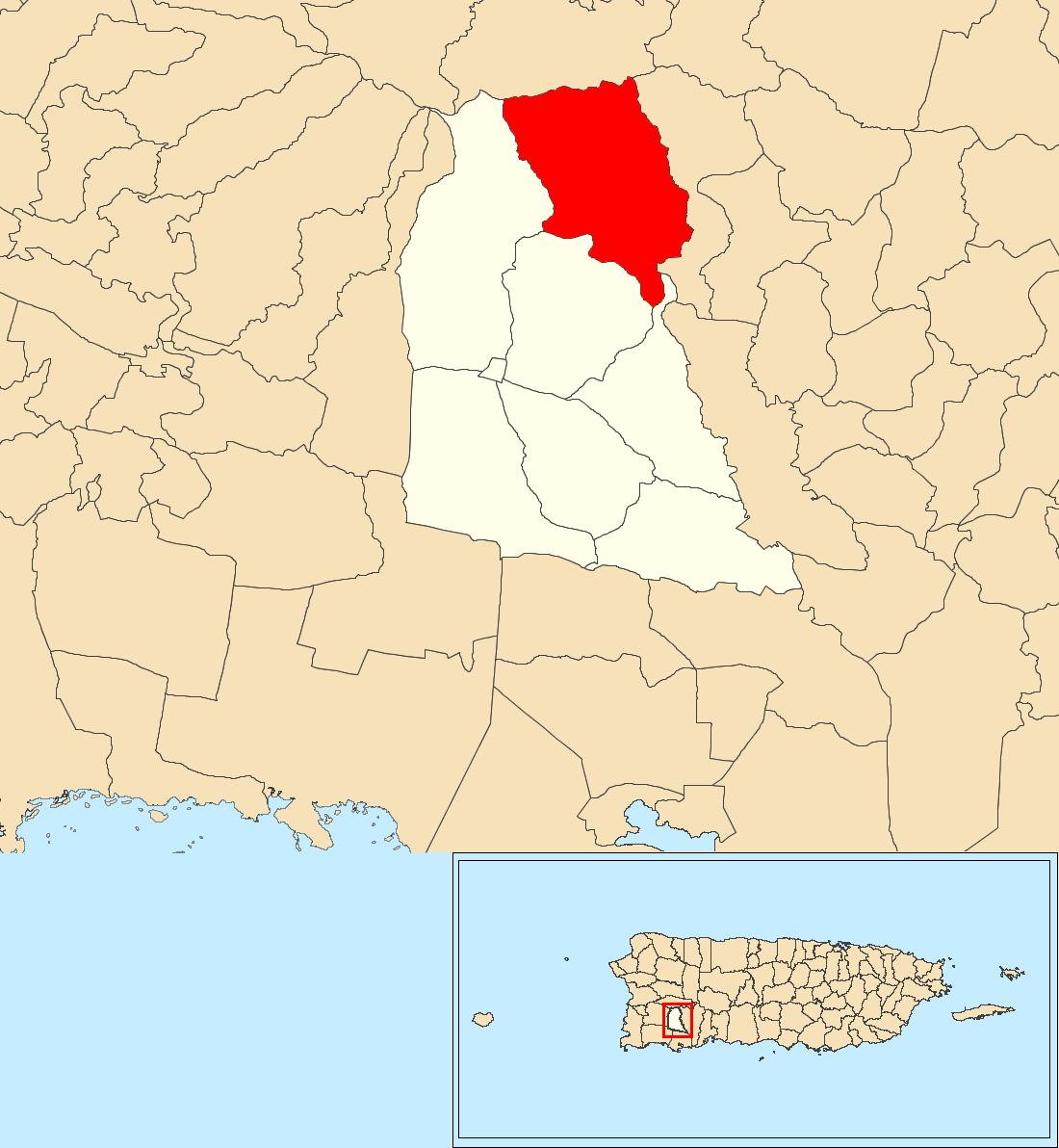
- Location of Tabonuco within the municipality of Sabana Grande shown in red

- Location of Puerto Rico
- Coordinates: 18°07′36″N 66°56′01″W
- Commonwealth: Puerto Rico
- Municipality: Sabana Grande

Area
  - Total: 6.56 sq mi (17.0 km^{2})
  - Land: 6.56 sq mi (17.0 km^{2})
  - Water: 0 sq mi (0 km^{2})
- Elevation: 1,253 ft (382 m)

Population (2010)
  - Total: 281
  - Density: 47.2/sq mi (18.2/km^{2})
- Source: 2010 Census
- Time zone: UTC−4 (AST)

Tabonuco is a barrio in the municipality of Sabana Grande, Puerto Rico. Its population in 2010 was 281.

== History ==
Tabonuco was in Spain's gazetteers until Puerto Rico was ceded by Spain in the aftermath of the Spanish–American War under the terms of the Treaty of Paris of 1898 and became an unincorporated territory of the United States. In 1899, the United States Department of War conducted a census of Puerto Rico finding that the population of Tabonuco barrio was 1,888.

Historical population
Census	Pop.	Note	%±
1900	1,888		—
1910	884		−53.2%
1920	1,330		50.5%
1930	883		−33.6%
1940	693		−21.5%
1950	756		9.1%
1960	608		−19.6%
1970	332		−45.4%
1980	268		−19.3%
1990	397		48.1%
2000	335		−15.6%
2010	281		−16.1%
U.S. Decennial Census; 1899 (shown as 1900) 1910-1930; 1930-1950 1980-2000 2010

== See also ==
- List of communities in Puerto Rico
