= Santana, Sabana Grande, Puerto Rico =

Barrio of Puerto Rico

Santana
- Barrio
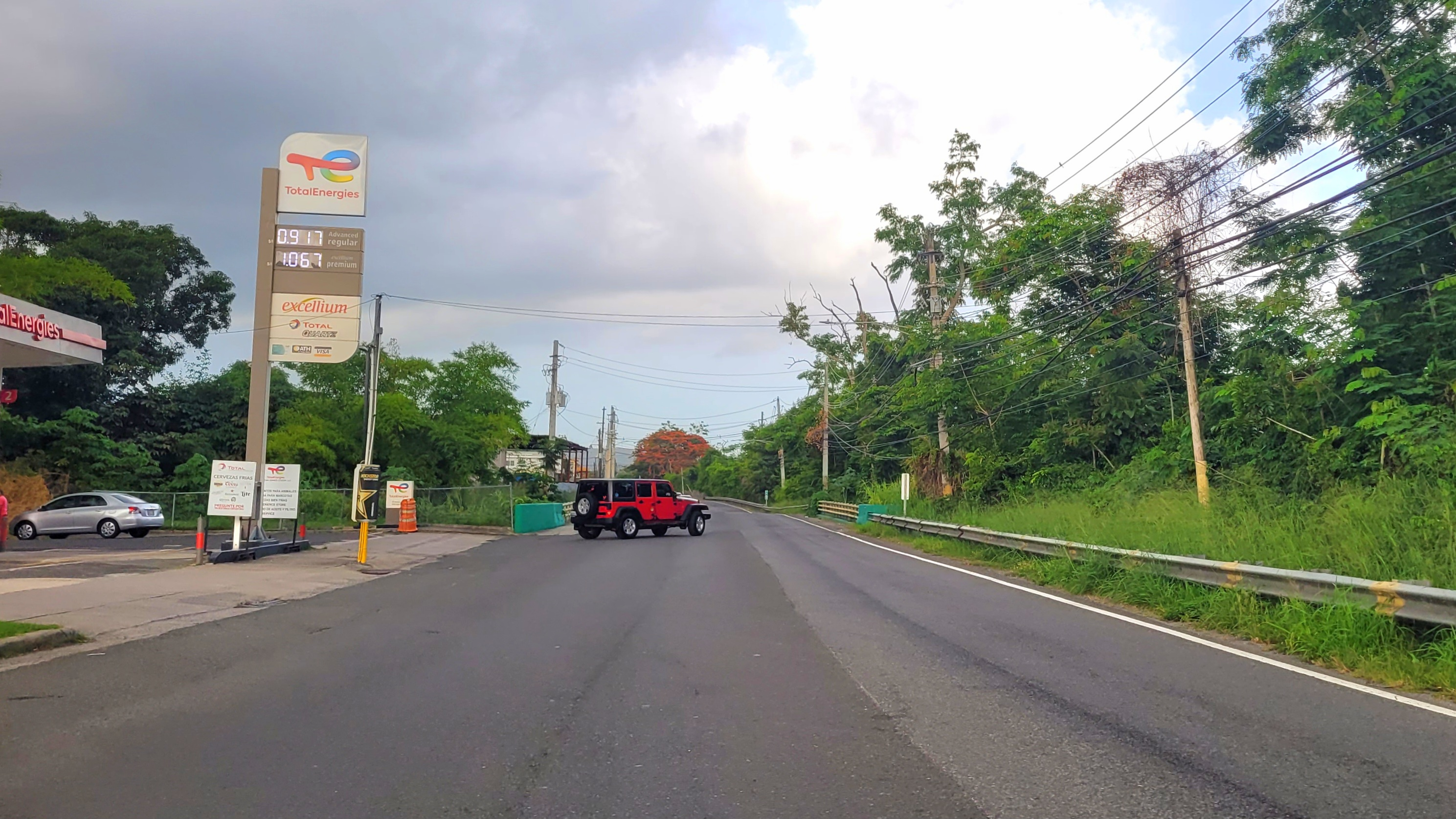
- Puerto Rico Highway 102 between Santana and Rayo barrios

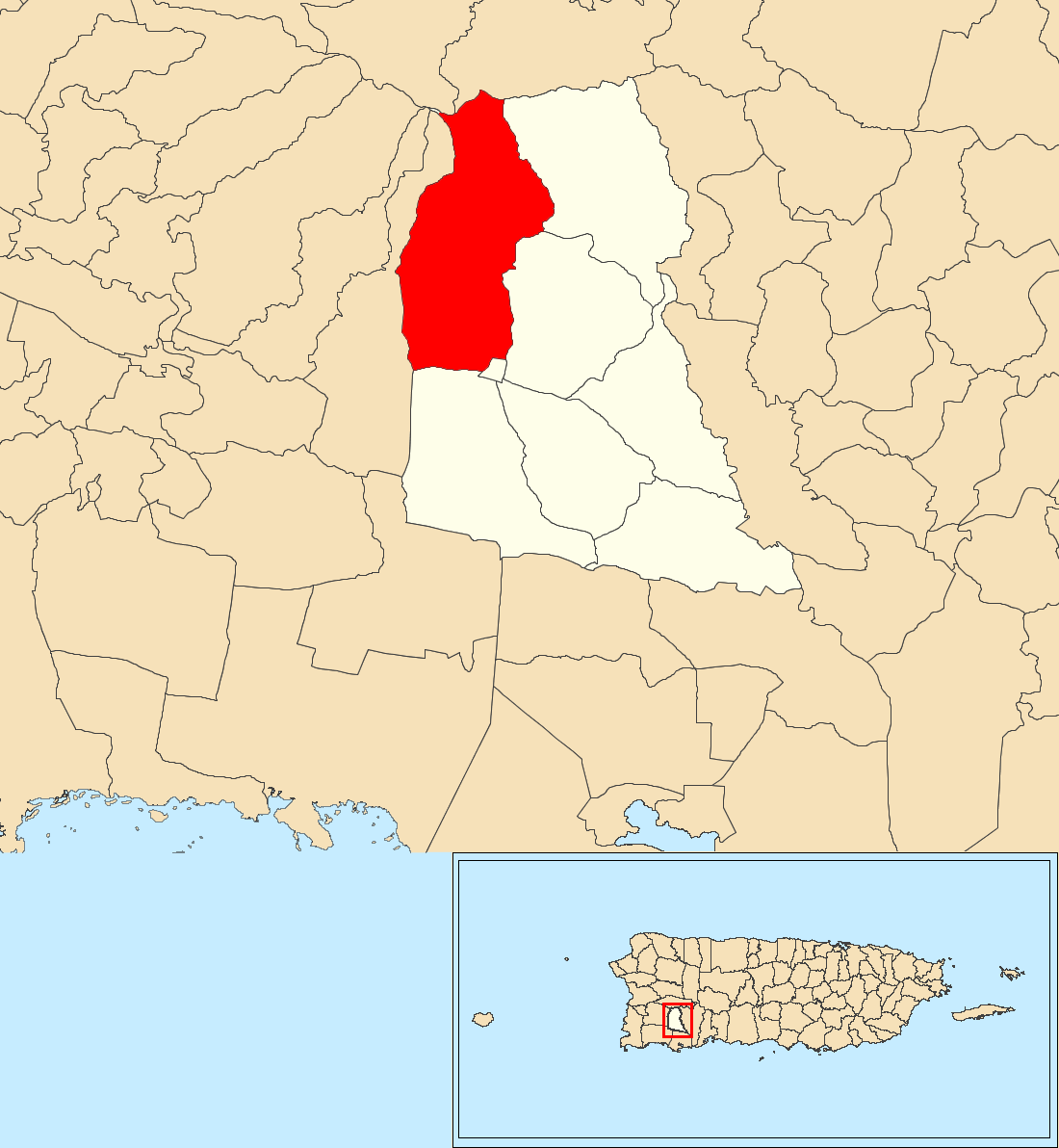
- Location of Santana within the municipality of Sabana Grande shown in red

- Location of Puerto Rico
- Coordinates: 18°06′39″N 66°57′57″W
- Commonwealth: Puerto Rico
- Municipality: Sabana Grande

Area
  - Total: 7.3 sq mi (19 km^{2})
  - Land: 7.3 sq mi (19 km^{2})
  - Water: 0 sq mi (0 km^{2})
- Elevation: 1,037 ft (316 m)

Population (2010)
  - Total: 7,291
  - Density: 998.8/sq mi (385.6/km^{2})
- Source: 2010 Census
- Time zone: UTC−4 (AST)

Santana is a barrio in the municipality of Sabana Grande, Puerto Rico. Its population in 2010 was 7,291.

== History ==
Santana was in Spain's gazetteers until Puerto Rico was ceded by Spain in the aftermath of the Spanish–American War under the terms of the Treaty of Paris of 1898 and became an unincorporated territory of the United States. In 1899, the United States Department of War conducted a census of Puerto Rico finding that the population of Santana barrio was 921.

Historical population
Census	Pop.	Note	%±
1900	921		—
1910	1,438		56.1%
1920	1,453		1.0%
1930	1,508		3.8%
1940	1,699		12.7%
1950	2,214		30.3%
1960	2,130		−3.8%
1970	0		−100.0%
1980	4,675		—
1990	6,753		44.4%
2000	7,667		13.5%
2010	7,291		−4.9%
U.S. Decennial Census; 1899 (shown as 1900) 1910-1930; 1930-1950 1980-2000 2010

== See also ==
- List of communities in Puerto Rico
