= Puerto Rico Highway 128 =

Highway in Puerto Rico

Highway 128
- Ruta 128

Route information
- Maintained by Puerto Rico DTPW
- Length: 58.7 km (36.5 mi)
- Existed: 1953–present

Major junctions
- South end: PR-2 / PR-3334 in Susúa Baja
- PR-127 / PR-121 in Susúa Baja; PR-368 in Susúa Baja; PR-371 in Almácigo Bajo; PR-372 in Almácigo Bajo–Diego Hernández; PR-373 in Naranjo; PR-374 in Rubias; PR-105 in Indiera Alta; PR-431 in Bartolo; PR-135 in Bartolo; PR-432 in La Torre
- North end: PR-1111 / PR-4128 in Lares barrio-pueblo

Location
- Country: United States
- Territory: Puerto Rico
- Municipalities: Yauco, Maricao, Lares

Highway system
- Roads in Puerto Rico; List
← PR-127	→ PR-129
← PR-4119	PR-4128	→ PR-4413

Puerto Rico Highway 128 (PR-128) is a road that travels from Yauco, Puerto Rico to Lares. This highway extends from PR-2 in Yauco and ends at PR-111 near downtown Lares.

== Major intersections ==
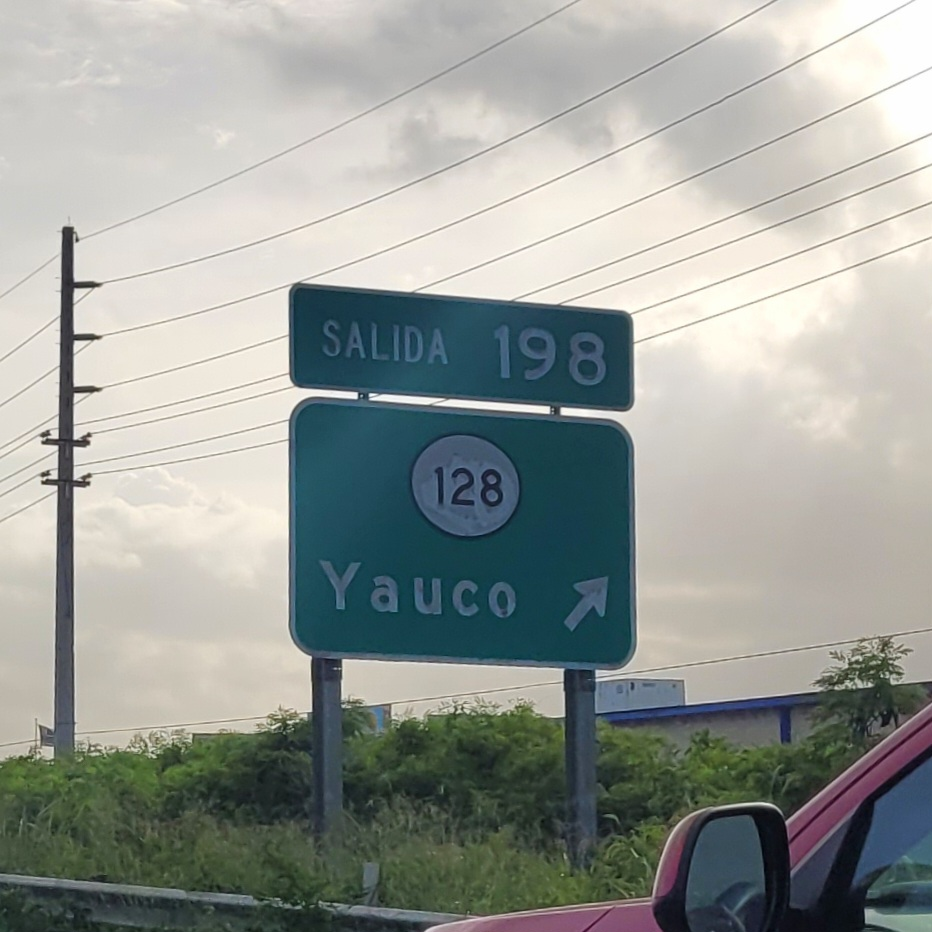
PR-2 west at exit 198 to PR-128 in Yauco

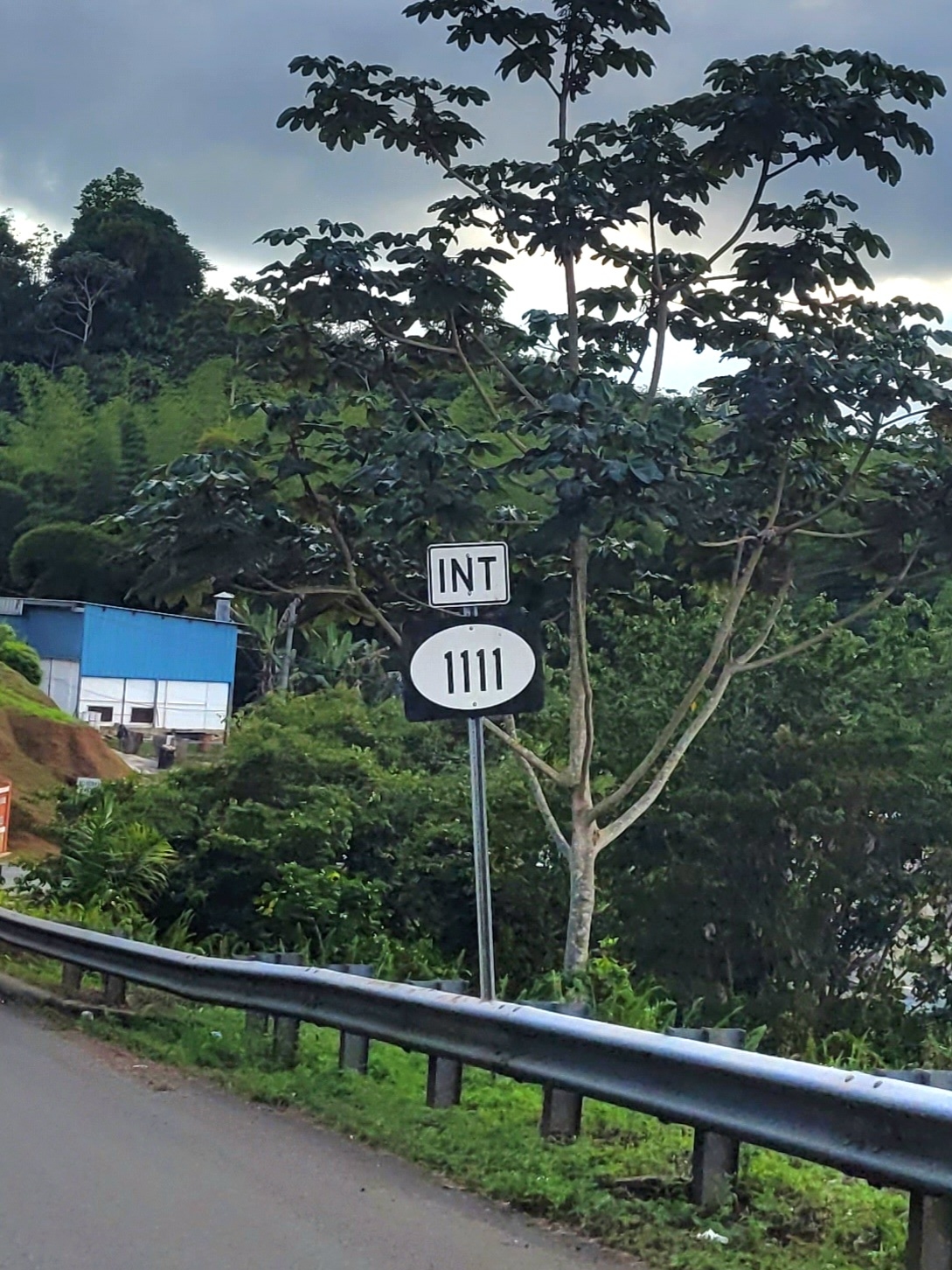
PR-128 north approaching PR-1111 in Lares

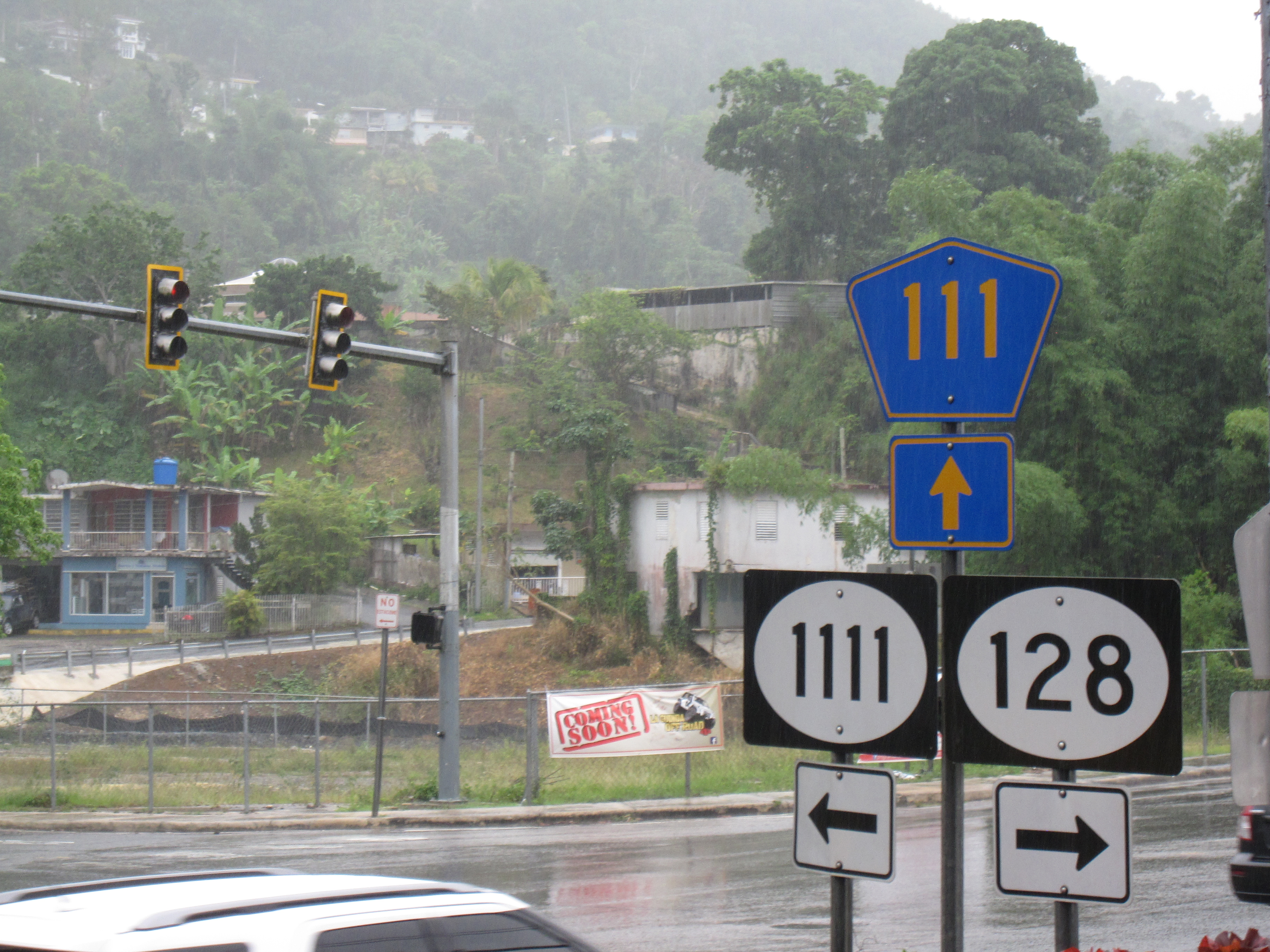
Signs for Puerto Rico Highways 111, 128 and 1111 in Lares

Municipality	Location	km	mi	Destinations	Notes
Yauco	Susúa Baja	0.0	0.0	PR-3334 – Barina	Continuation beyond PR-2
Yauco	Susúa Baja	0.0	0.0	PR-2 (Expreso Roberto Sánchez Vilella) – Ponce, Mayagüez	Southern terminus of PR-128 and western terminus of PR-3334; PR-2 exit 198; diamond interchange
Yauco	Susúa Baja	0.5– 0.6	0.31– 0.37	PR-121 / PR-127 (Calle 25 de Julio) – Yauco, Guánica, Sabana Grande	
Yauco	Susúa Baja	1.4– 1.5	0.87– 0.93	PR-368 – Yauco, Sabana Grande	
Yauco	Susúa Baja–Almácigo Bajo line	1.8– 1.9	1.1– 1.2	PR-376 – Yauco, Almácigo Bajo	
Yauco	Almácigo Bajo	2.2	1.4	PR-371 – Yauco, Almácigo Bajo	
Yauco	Almácigo Bajo–Diego Hernández line	3.1– 3.2	1.9– 2.0	PR-3372 (Calle La Trocha) – Yauco	
Yauco	Almácigo Bajo–Diego Hernández line	3.3– 3.4	2.1– 2.1	PR-372 – Diego Hernández	
Yauco	Naranjo	12.8	8.0	PR-373 – Naranjo	
Yauco	Rubias	24.5	15.2	PR-374 – Río Prieto	
Maricao	Indiera Alta	25.7	16.0	PR-105 (Ruta Panorámica) – Maricao	Southern terminus of the Ruta Panorámica concurrency; the Ruta Panorámica continues toward Sabana Grande
Maricao	Indiera Alta	33.1	20.6	PR-428 – Indiera Alta	
Maricao	Indiera Alta	33.1	20.6	Puente de Río Prieto over the Río Prieto	
Lares	Bartolo	36.8	22.9	PR-431 – Río Prieto	
Lares	Bartolo	37.9	23.5	PR-135 (Ruta Panorámica) – Adjuntas	Northern terminus of the Ruta Panorámica concurrency
Lares	Bartolo	40.6	25.2	PR-4428 – Bartolo	
Lares	La Torre	44.3	27.5	PR-432 – Pezuela	
Lares	Río Blanco	47.5	29.5	Puente del Río Blanco	
Lares	La Torre–Mirasol– Buenos Aires tripoint	52.6	32.7	To PR-129 / PR-Calle La Torre – Utuado, Adjuntas	
Lares	Buenos Aires–La Torre line	54.6	33.9	PR-4131 – La Torre	Former PR-431
Lares	Lares barrio-pueblo	58.7	36.5	PR-1111 / PR-4128 – Lares	Northern terminus of PR-128
1.000 mi = 1.609 km; 1.000 km = 0.621 mi: Concurrency terminus

== Related route ==
Highway 4128
- Location: Lares
- Length: 1.2 km (0.75 mi)

Puerto Rico Highway 4128 (PR-4128) is a bypass road that branches off from PR-128 and ends at PR-111 west of downtown Lares. The entire route is located in Lares barrio-pueblo, Lares.

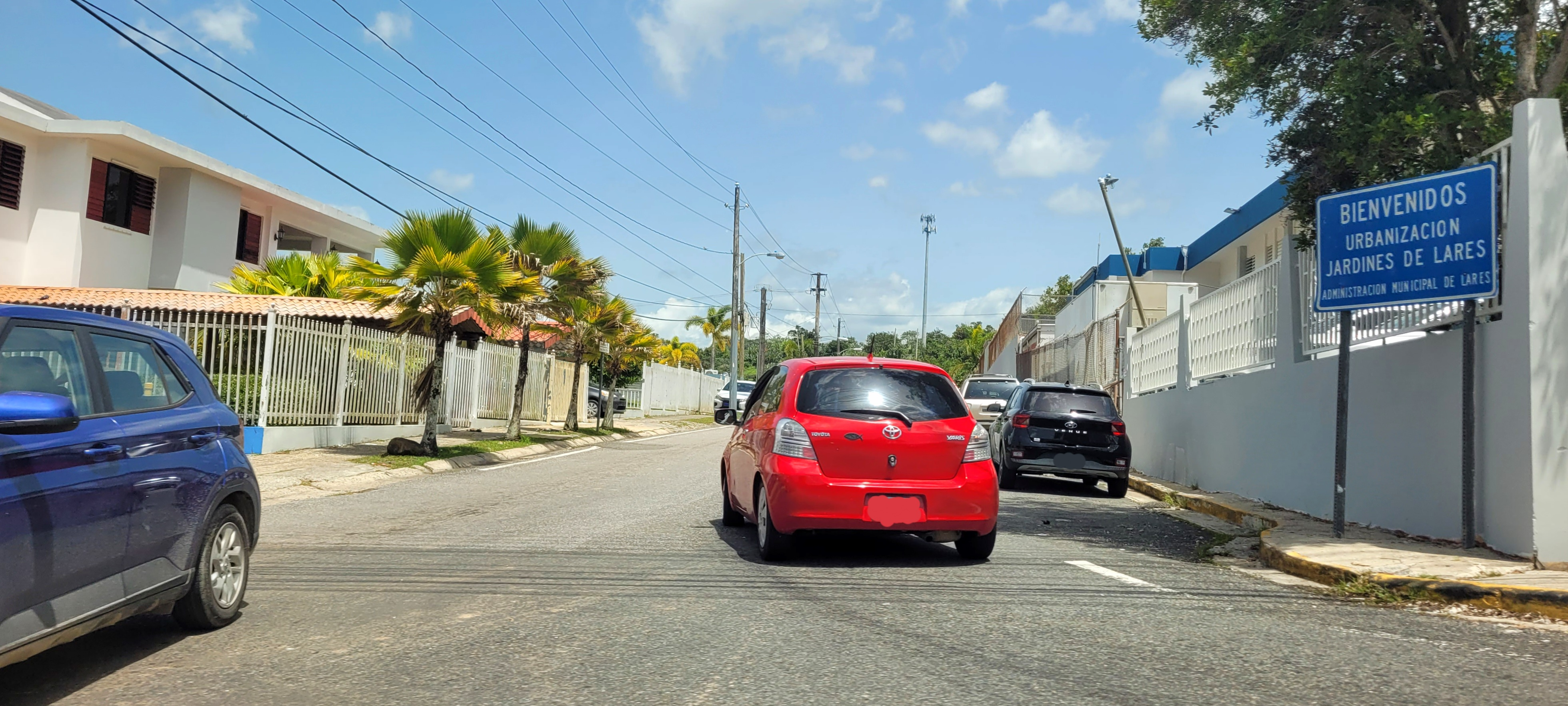
Western terminus of PR-4128

km	mi	Destinations	Notes
1.2	0.75	PR-111 (Avenida Los Patriotas) – Utuado, San Sebastián	Western terminus of PR-4128
0.0	0.0	PR-128 / PR-1111 – Lares, Yauco	Eastern terminus of PR-4128
1.000 mi = 1.609 km; 1.000 km = 0.621 mi

== See also ==
- 1953 Puerto Rico highway renumbering
