= Puerto Rico Highway 117 =

Highway in Puerto Rico

Highway 117
- Ruta 117

Route information
- Maintained by Puerto Rico DTPW
- Length: 13.1 km (8.1 mi)

Major junctions
- West end: PR-315 in Sabana Yeguas–Lajas
- PR-321 in Lajas Arriba–Santa Rosa; PR-118 / PR-322 in Lajas Arriba; PR-329 in Plata–Lajas Arriba; PR-327 in Plata; PR-328 in Rayo; PR-2 in Rayo
- East end: PR-121 in Rayo–Machuchal

Location
- Country: United States
- Territory: Puerto Rico
- Municipalities: Lajas, Sabana Grande

Highway system
- Roads in Puerto Rico; List
← PR-116	→ PR-118

Puerto Rico Highway 117 (PR-117) is a rural road from Lajas, Puerto Rico to Sabana Grande. It begins at its junction with PR-116 and PR-315 south of downtown Lajas and ends at its intersection with PR-121 in southern Sabana Grande.

== Major intersections ==
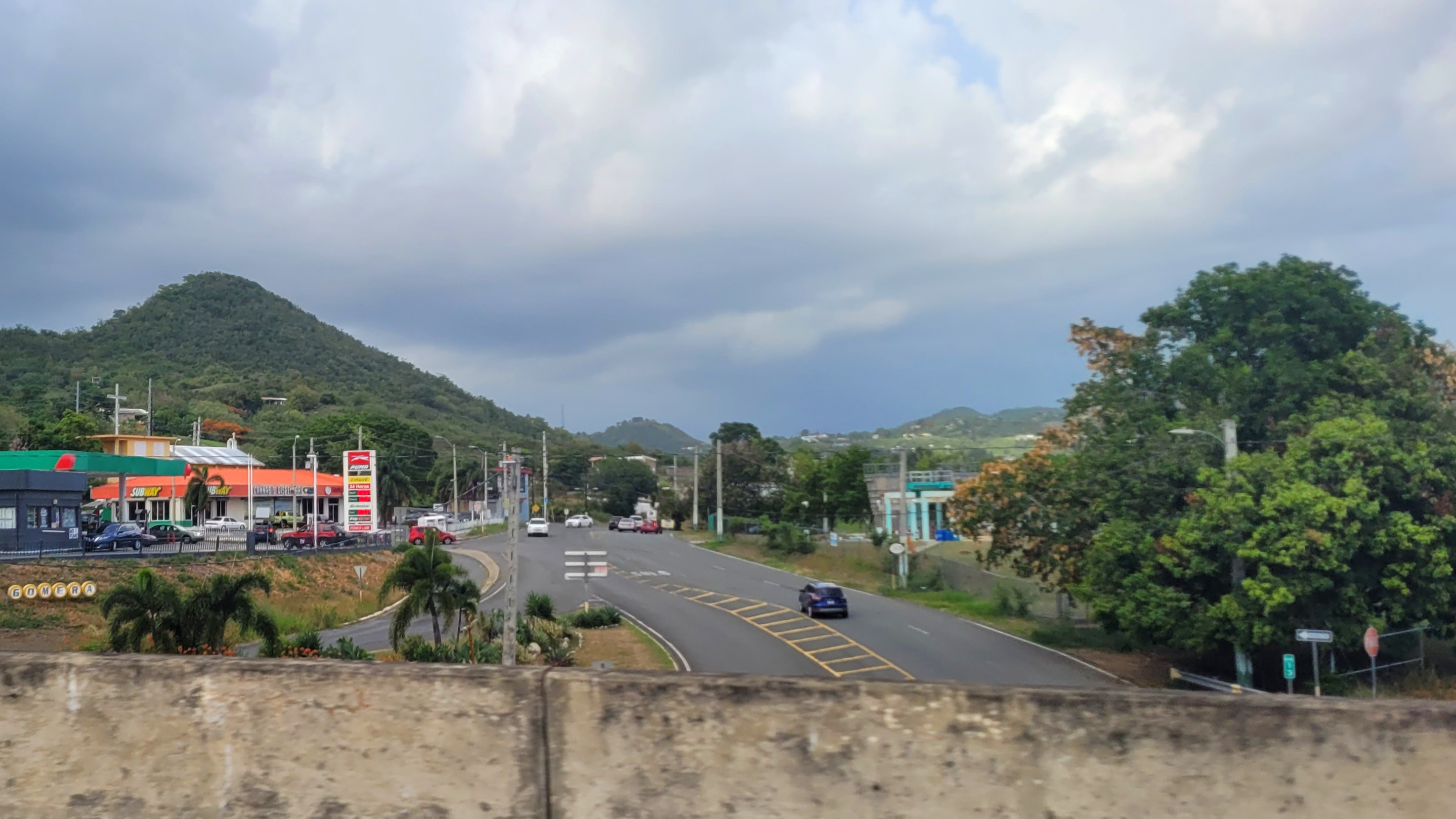
PR-117 east at PR-2 interchange in Rayo, Sabana Grande

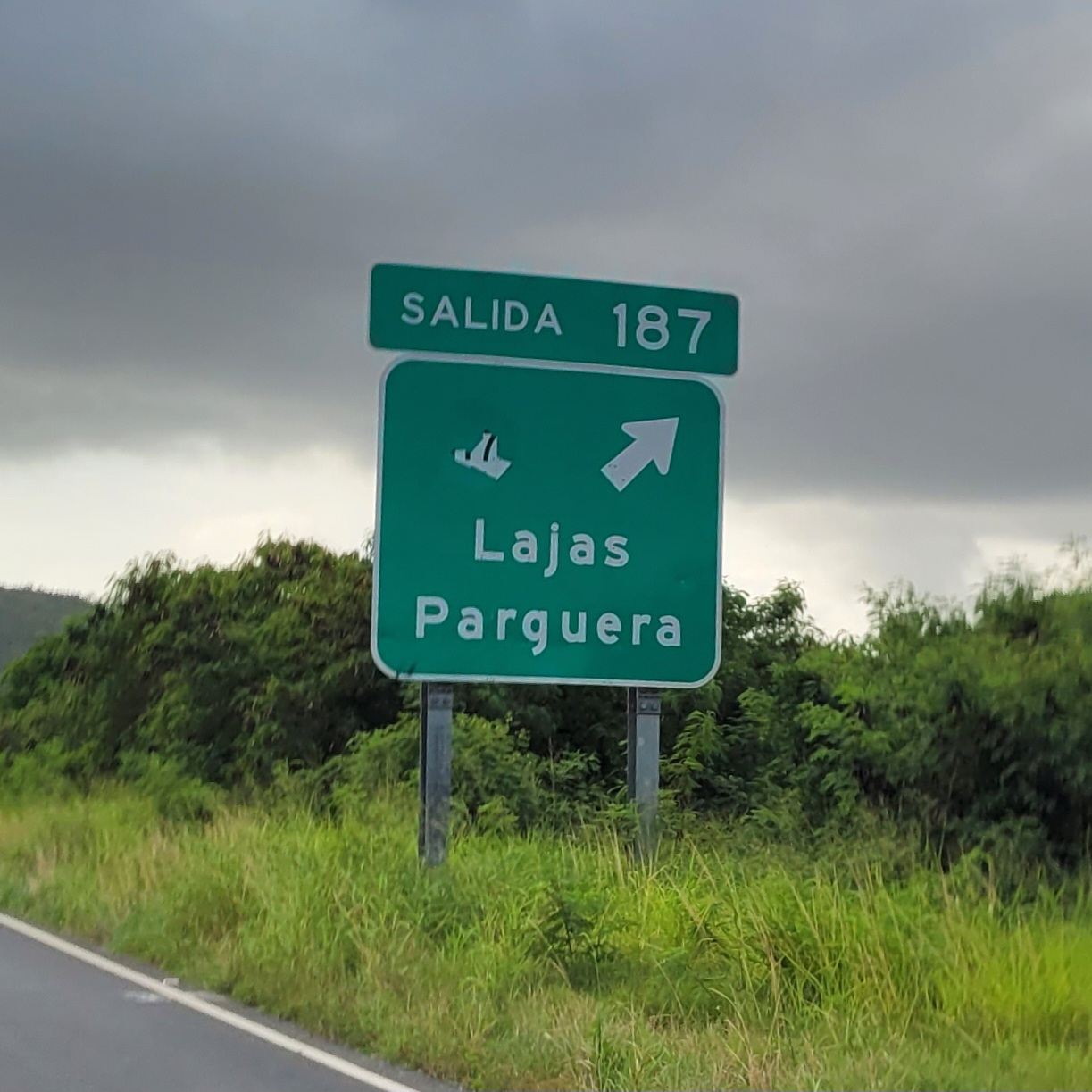
PR-2 west at exit 187 to PR-117 in Rayo, Sabana Grande

Municipality	Location	km	mi	Destinations	Notes
Lajas	Sabana Yeguas–Lajas line	0.0	0.0	PR-315 to PR-116 (Avenida Manuel "Pito" Pagán Ramírez) – Lajas, Guánica	Western terminus of PR-117
Lajas	Lajas Arriba–Santa Rosa line	2.8	1.7	PR-321 – Santa Rosa	
Lajas	Lajas Arriba	5.4	3.4	PR-118 / PR-322 – San Germán, Lajas Arriba	
Lajas	Plata–Lajas Arriba line	7.7	4.8	PR-329 – Minillas	
Lajas	Plata	9.1	5.7	PR-327 – Plata	
Sabana Grande	Rayo	11.1	6.9	PR-328 – Rayo	
Sabana Grande	Rayo	12.9– 13.0	8.0– 8.1	PR-2 (Expreso Roberto Sánchez Vilella) – Mayagüez, Ponce	PR-2 exit 187; diamond interchange
Sabana Grande	Rayo–Machuchal line	13.1	8.1	PR-121 – Sabana Grande, Yauco	Eastern terminus of PR-117
1.000 mi = 1.609 km; 1.000 km = 0.621 mi
