= Puerto Rico Highway 121 =

Highway in Puerto Rico

Highway 121
- Ruta 121

Route information
- Maintained by Puerto Rico DTPW
- Length: 15.4 km (9.6 mi)

Major junctions
- West end: PR-102 / PR-368 in Sabana Grande barrio-pueblo
- PR-328 in Machuchal–Rayo; PR-369 in Rayo–Machuchal; PR-117 in Machuchal–Rayo; PR-367 in Rayo–Machuchal; PR-332 in Susúa; PR-326 in Susúa Baja
- East end: PR-127 / PR-128 in Susúa Baja

Location
- Country: United States
- Territory: Puerto Rico
- Municipalities: Sabana Grande, Yauco

Highway system
- Roads in Puerto Rico; List
← PR-120	→ PR-122

Puerto Rico Highway 121 (PR-121) is a road that travels from Sabana Grande, Puerto Rico to Yauco. This highway begins at its intersection with PR-102 and PR-368 in downtown Sabana Grande and ends at its junction with PR-127 and PR-128 in Susúa Baja.

== Major intersections ==
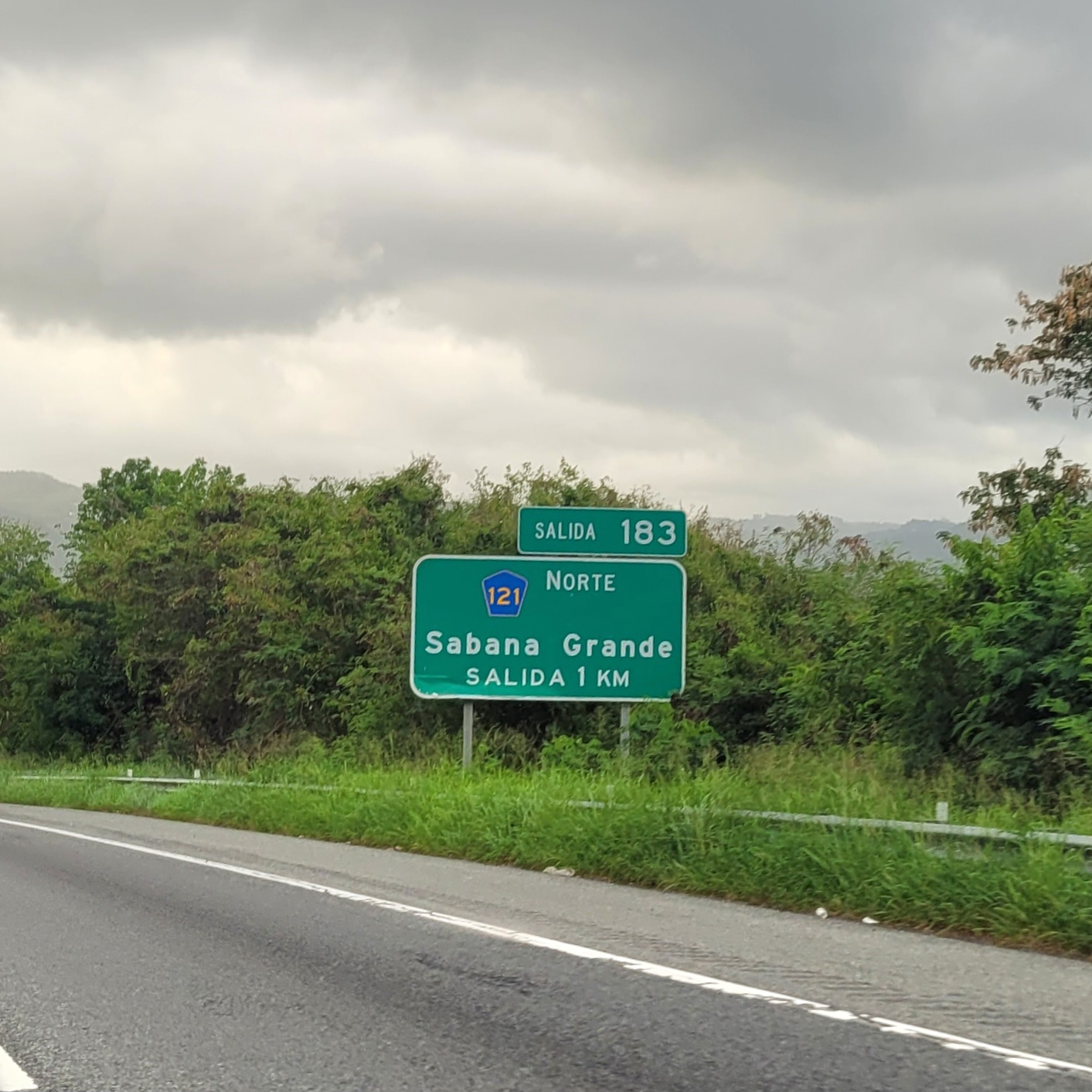
PR-2 west approaching exit 183 to PR-121 in Rayo, Sabana Grande

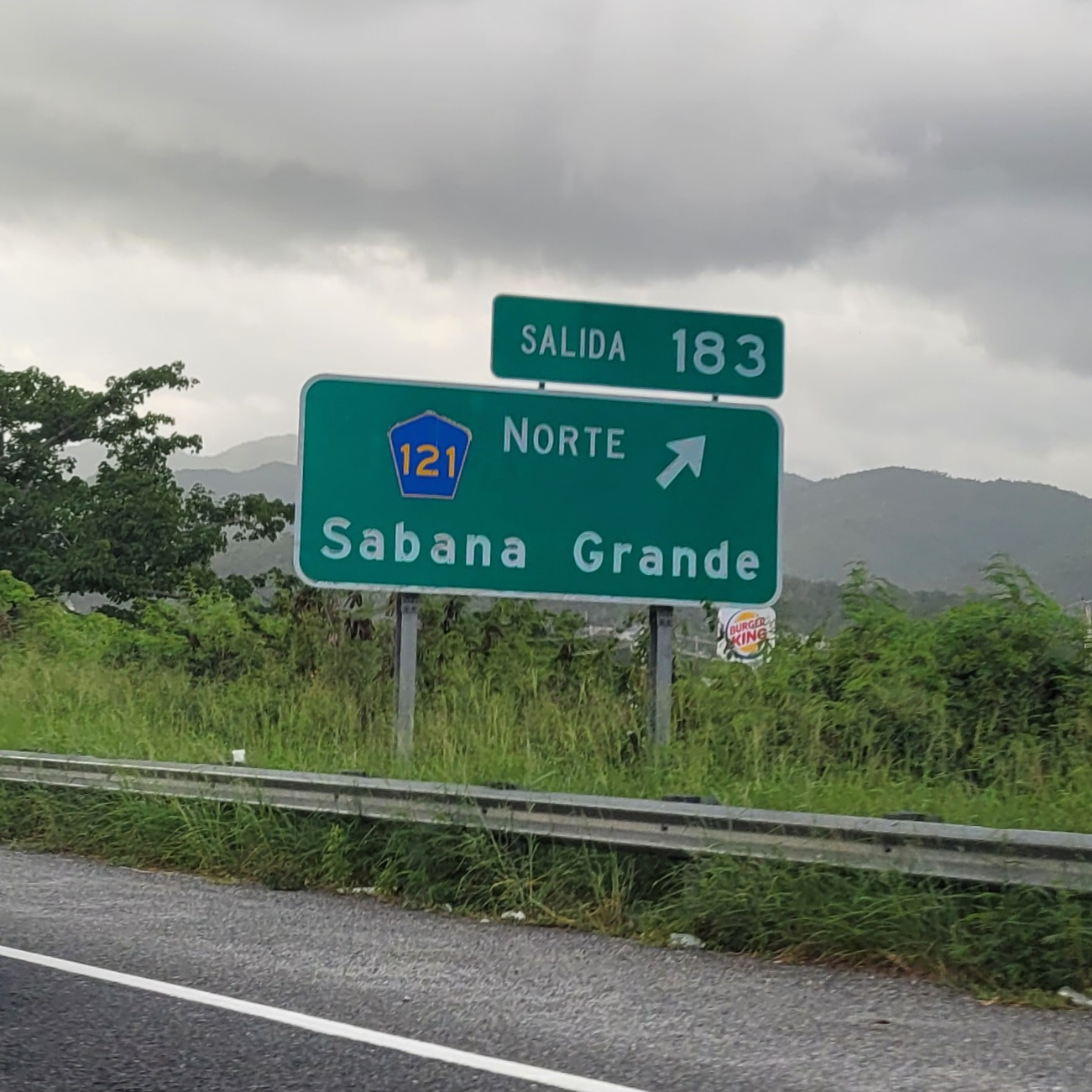
PR-2 west at exit 183 to PR-121 near Sabana Grande barrio-pueblo

Municipality	Location	km	mi	Destinations	Notes
Sabana Grande	Sabana Grande barrio-pueblo	0.0	0.0	PR-102 / PR-368 / PR-Calle Francisco Mariano Quiñones – Sabana Grande	Western terminus of PR-121
Sabana Grande	Machuchal–Rayo line	0.6– 0.7	0.37– 0.43	To PR-2 (Expreso Roberto Sánchez Vilella) / PR-Calle Martínez Vega – Mayagüez, Ponce	PR-2 exit 183
Sabana Grande	Machuchal–Rayo line	1.3	0.81	PR-328 – Rayo	
Sabana Grande	Machuchal–Rayo line	2.4	1.5	PR-369 – Machuchal	
Sabana Grande	Machuchal–Rayo line	4.2	2.6	PR-117 to PR-2 (Expreso Roberto Sánchez Vilella) – Lajas, Mayagüez, Ponce	PR-2 exit 187
Sabana Grande	Machuchal–Rayo line	5.2	3.2	PR-367 – Machuchal	
Sabana Grande	Susúa	8.6– 8.7	5.3– 5.4	PR-332 – Guánica	
Yauco	Susúa Baja	13.6	8.5	PR-326 (Carretera Agustín "Quino" López Oliveras) – Guánica	Former PR-116R
Yauco	Susúa Baja	14.2	8.8	PR-Avenida Luis Muñoz Marín – Yauco	
Yauco	Susúa Baja	15.4	9.6	PR-128 (Avenida Pedro Albizu Campos) – Lares, Ponce	Eastern terminus of PR-121 and western terminus of PR-127
Yauco	Susúa Baja	15.4	9.6	PR-127 (Calle 25 de Julio) – Yauco	Continuation beyond PR-128
1.000 mi = 1.609 km; 1.000 km = 0.621 mi
