= Susúa (disambiguation) =

Susúa may refer to:

== Places ==
- Susúa, a barrio in Sabana Grande, Puerto Rico
- Susúa Alta, a barrio in Yauco, Puerto Rico
- Susúa Baja, Guánica, Puerto Rico, a barrio
- Susúa Baja, Yauco, Puerto Rico, a barrio
