= Almácigo Alto =

Barrio of Yauco, Puerto Rico

- Barrio
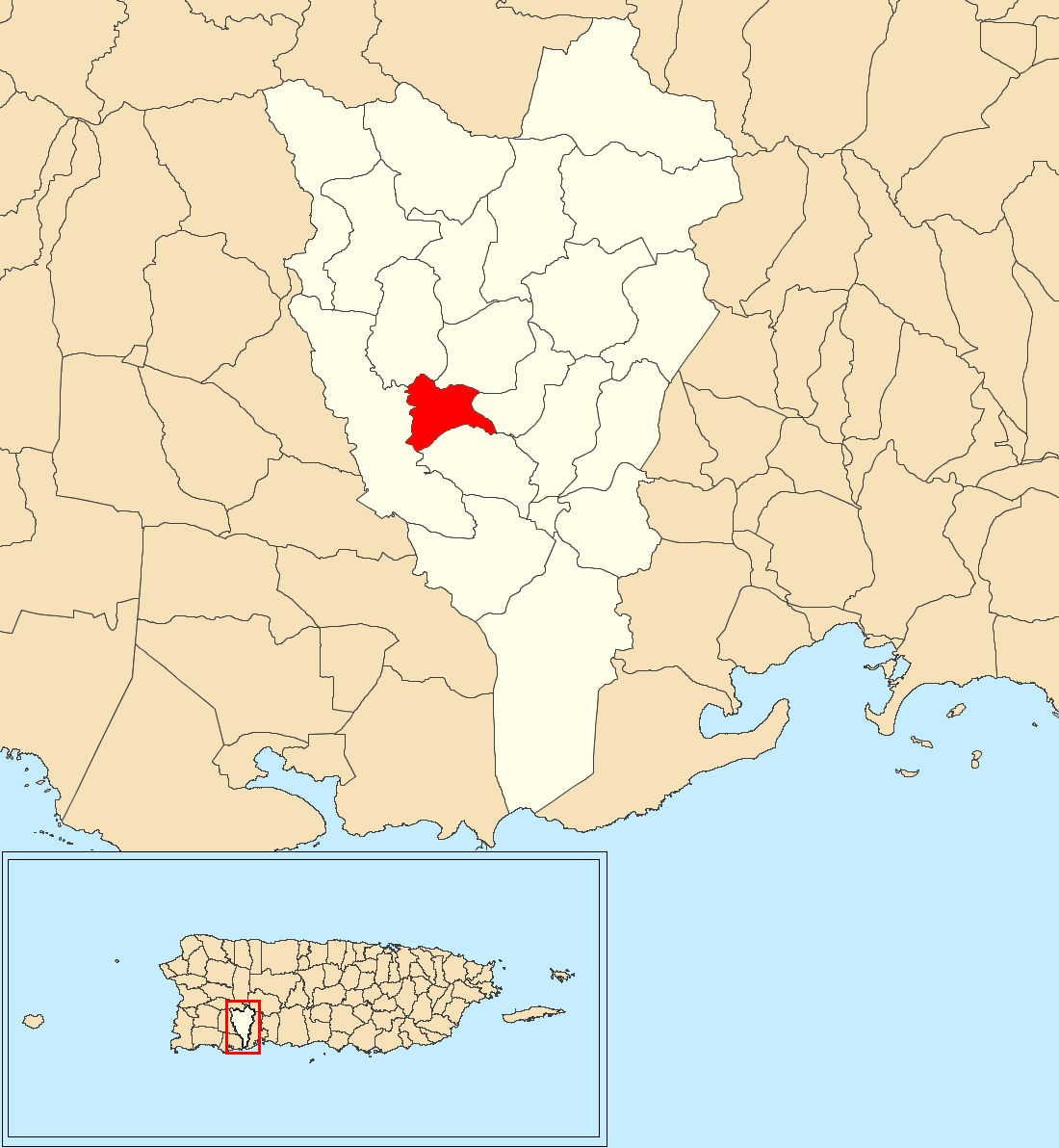
- Location of Almácigo Alto within the municipality of Yauco shown in red

- Location of Puerto Rico
- Coordinates: 18°03′57″N 66°52′40″W
- Commonwealth: Puerto Rico
- Municipality: Yauco

Area
  - Total: 1.21 sq mi (3.1 km^{2})
  - Land: 1.21 sq mi (3.1 km^{2})
  - Water: 0 sq mi (0 km^{2})
- Elevation: 545 ft (166 m)

Population (2010)
  - Total: 1,659
  - Density: 1,382.5/sq mi (533.8/km^{2})
- Source: 2010 Census
- Time zone: UTC−4 (AST)
- ZIP Code: 00698
- Area code: 787/939

Almácigo Alto is a barrio in the municipality of Yauco, Puerto Rico. Its population in 2010 was 1,659.

== Geography ==
Almácigo Alto is located northwest of Yauco Pueblo (downtown Yauco), and it is bounded by barrios Almácigo Bajo to the south, Diego Hernández to the east, Collores and Algarrobo to the north, and Susúa Alta to the east.

== Demographics ==
Almácigo Alto was in Spain's gazetteers until Puerto Rico was ceded by Spain in the aftermath of the Spanish–American War under the terms of the Treaty of Paris of 1898 and became an unincorporated territory of the United States. In 1899, the United States Department of War conducted a census of Puerto Rico finding that the combined population of Almácigo Alto barrio and Jácana barrio was 1,077.

Historical population
Census	Pop.	Note	%±
1910	593		—
1920	771		30.0%
1930	706		−8.4%
1940	746		5.7%
1950	874		17.2%
1960	1,272		45.5%
1970	1,271		−0.1%
1980	1,400		10.1%
1990	1,575		12.5%
2000	1,905		21.0%
2010	1,659		−12.9%
U.S. Decennial Census; 1900 (N/A) 1910-1930; 1930-1950 1980-2000 2010

== See also ==
- List of communities in Puerto Rico
