= Puerto Rico Highway 118 =

Highway in Puerto Rico

Highway 118
- Ruta 118

Route information
- Maintained by Puerto Rico DTPW
- Length: 5.0 km (3.1 mi)

Major junctions
- South end: PR-117 / PR-322 in Lajas Arriba
- North end: PR-102 in Retiro

Location
- Country: United States
- Territory: Puerto Rico
- Municipalities: Lajas, San Germán

Highway system
- Roads in Puerto Rico; List
← PR-117	→ PR-119

Puerto Rico Highway 118 (PR-118) is a rural road located between Lajas, Puerto Rico and San Germán. This road extends from PR-117 in Lajas Arriba and ends at PR-102 in Retiro.

== Major intersections ==
Municipality	Location	km	mi	Destinations	Notes
Lajas	Lajas Arriba	5.0	3.1	PR-322	Continuation beyond PR-117
Lajas	Lajas Arriba	5.0	3.1	PR-117 – Lajas, Sabana Grande	Southern terminus of PR-118 and northern terminus of PR-322
San Germán	Retiro	0.0	0.0	PR-102 – San Germán, Sabana Grande	Northern terminus of PR-118
1.000 mi = 1.609 km; 1.000 km = 0.621 mi
