= Barina, Yauco, Puerto Rico =

Barrio of Puerto Rico

Barina
- Barrio
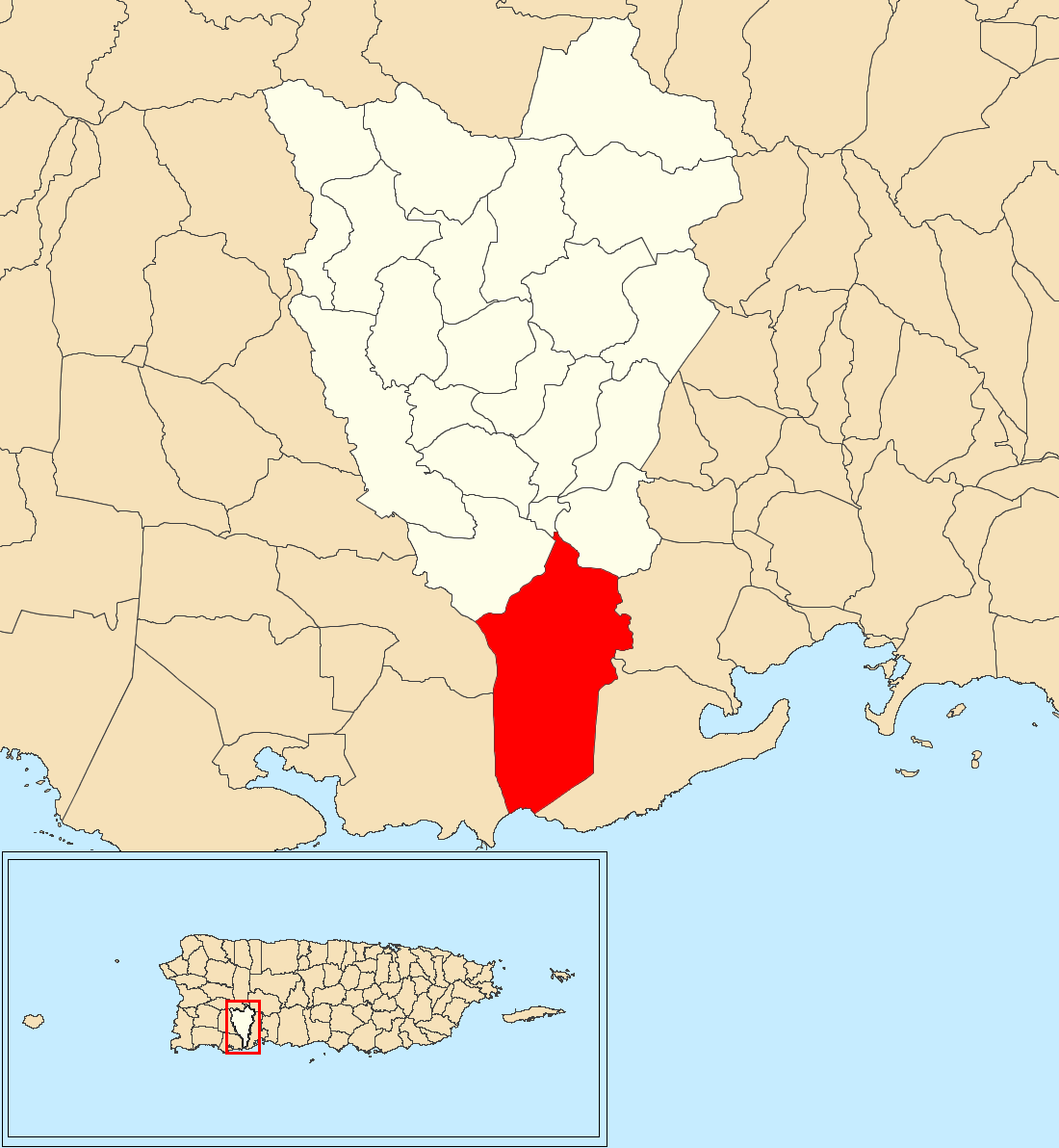
- Location of Barina within the municipality of Yauco shown in red

- Location of Puerto Rico
- Coordinates: 17°59′47″N 66°51′09″W
- Commonwealth: Puerto Rico
- Municipality: Yauco

Area
  - Total: 8.76 sq mi (22.7 km^{2})
  - Land: 8.66 sq mi (22.4 km^{2})
  - Water: 0.10 sq mi (0.26 km^{2})
- Elevation: 449 ft (137 m)

Population (2010)
  - Total: 5,930
  - Density: 684.8/sq mi (264.4/km^{2})
- Source: 2010 Census
- Time zone: UTC−4 (AST)

Barina is a barrio in the municipality of Yauco, Puerto Rico. Its population in 2010 was 5,930.

== Geography ==
Barina barrio is located in the southernmost part of the municipality of Yauco, immediately south of Yauco Pueblo (downtown Yauco) and the barrios of Susúa Baja and Jácana. It has a small southern coast facing the Caribbean Sea. The Yauco River crosses it from north to south, forming a flat valley that is used for agriculture. The rest of the barrio is hilly and forms part of the Southern Karst region of Puerto Rico.

== Demographics ==
Barina was in Spain's gazetteers until Puerto Rico was ceded by Spain in the aftermath of the Spanish–American War under the terms of the Treaty of Paris of 1898 and became an unincorporated territory of the United States. In 1899, the United States Department of War conducted a census of Puerto Rico finding that the population of Barina barrio was 1,432.

Historical population
Census	Pop.	Note	%±
1900	1,432		—
1910	1,610		12.4%
1920	1,593		−1.1%
1930	1,546		−3.0%
1940	1,852		19.8%
1950	2,067		11.6%
1960	2,511		21.5%
1970	0		−100.0%
1980	3,762		—
1990	4,729		25.7%
2000	5,726		21.1%
2010	5,930		3.6%
U.S. Decennial Census; 1899 (shown as 1900) 1910-1930; 1930-1950 1980-2000 2010

== Landmarks and attractions ==
The Guánica State Forest is the largest and one of the best-preserved dry forests in Puerto Rico and the Caribbean.

The Guánica State Forest is also home to several beaches. Atolladora Beach, also known as Yauco Beach, in the Ballena Bay is the largest beach of the municipality. It is located in the Guánica State Forest bordering Ballena Beach (in the municipality of Guánica) and Tamarindo Beach (in the municipality of Guayanilla). It can be accessed by road PR-333.

== See also ==
- List of communities in Puerto Rico
