= Almácigo Bajo =

Barrio of Yauco, Puerto Rico

- Barrio
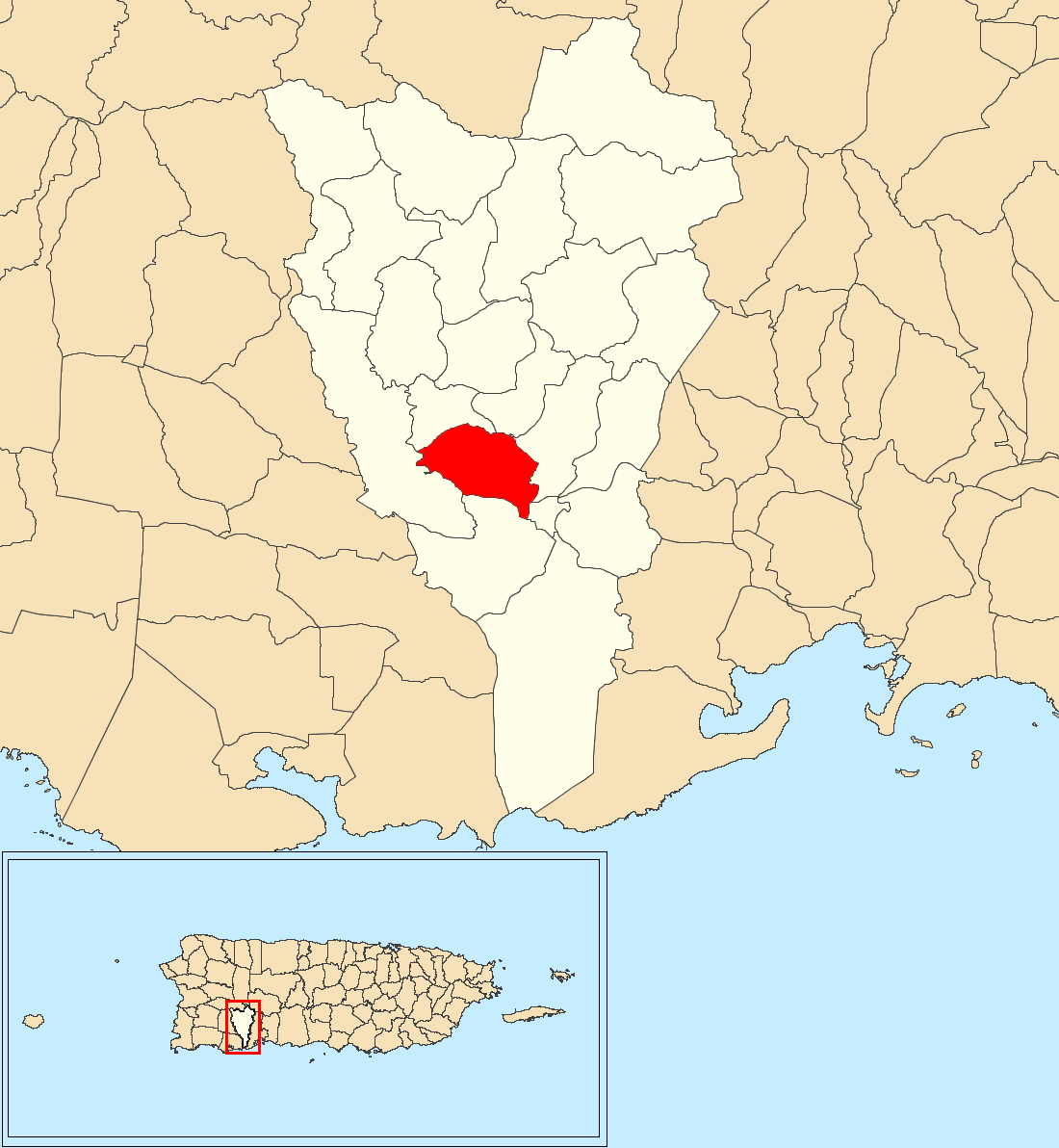
- Location of Almácigo Bajo within the municipality of Yauco shown in red

- Location of Puerto Rico
- Coordinates: 18°03′00″N 66°52′03″W
- Commonwealth: Puerto Rico
- Municipality: Yauco

Area
  - Total: 2.13 sq mi (5.5 km^{2})
  - Land: 2.12 sq mi (5.5 km^{2})
  - Water: 0.01 sq mi (0.026 km^{2})
- Elevation: 269 ft (82 m)

Population (2010)
  - Total: 5,443
  - Density: 2,567.5/sq mi (991.3/km^{2})
- Source: 2010 Census
- Time zone: UTC−4 (AST)
- ZIP Code: 00698
- Area code: 787/939

Almácigo Bajo is a barrio in the municipality of Yauco, Puerto Rico. Its population in 2010 was 5,443.

== History ==
Almácigo Bajo was in Spain's gazetteers until Puerto Rico was ceded by Spain in the aftermath of the Spanish–American War, under the terms of the Treaty of Paris of 1898, and became an unincorporated territory of the United States. In 1899, the United States Department of War conducted a census of Puerto Rico finding that the population of Almácigo Bajo barrio was 793.

== Geography ==
Almácigo Bajo is located immediately northwest of Yauco Pueblo (downtown Yauco) and is bounded in the north by Almácigo Alto, in the west by Susúa Alta, and in the southeast by Susúa Baja.

== Demographics ==
Historical population
Census	Pop.	Note	%±
1900	793		—
1910	881		11.1%
1920	835		−5.2%
1930	919		10.1%
1940	1,239		34.8%
1950	1,921		55.0%
1960	2,458		28.0%
1970	0		−100.0%
1980	3,519		—
1990	3,933		11.8%
2000	4,986		26.8%
2010	5,443		9.2%
U.S. Decennial Census; 1899 (shown as 1900) 1910-1930; 1930-1950 1980-2000 2010

== See also ==
- List of communities in Puerto Rico
