= Blanco River (Lares, Puerto Rico) =

River of Puerto Rico

Coordinates: 18.2532874°N 66.9073992°W

- Location of mouth
- Native name: Río Blanco (Spanish)

Location
- Commonwealth: Puerto Rico
- Municipality: Lares

Physical characteristics
- Source
  - elevation: 479 ft.

Blanco River (Spanish: Río Blanco) is a river located in barrio La Torre in Lares, and also in the municipalities of San Sebastián and Adjuntas, Puerto Rico.

== See also ==
- List of rivers of Puerto Rico
