= Retiro, San Germán, Puerto Rico =

Barrio of Puerto Rico

Retiro
- Barrio
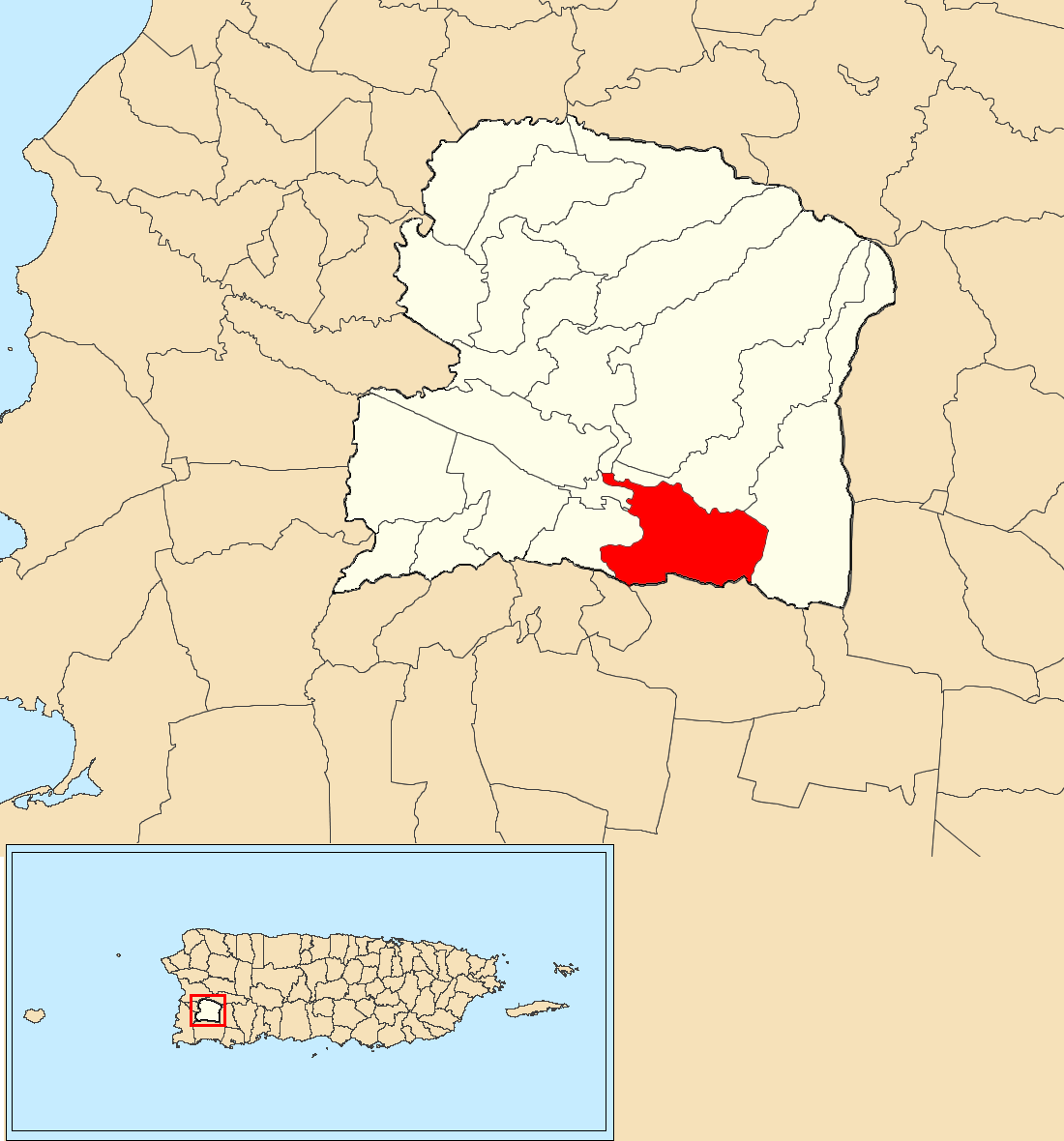
- Location of Retiro within the municipality of San Germán shown in red

- Location of Puerto Rico
- Coordinates: 18°04′08″N 67°01′16″W
- Commonwealth: Puerto Rico
- Municipality: San Germán

Area
  - Total: 3.21 sq mi (8.3 km^{2})
  - Land: 3.21 sq mi (8.3 km^{2})
  - Water: 0 sq mi (0 km^{2})
- Elevation: 417 ft (127 m)

Population (2010)
  - Total: 6,728
  - Density: 2,096/sq mi (809/km^{2})
- Source: 2010 Census
- Time zone: UTC−4 (AST)

Retiro is a barrio in the municipality of San Germán, Puerto Rico. Its population in 2010 was 6,728.

== History ==
Retiro was in Spain's gazetteers until Puerto Rico was ceded by Spain in the aftermath of the Spanish–American War under the terms of the Treaty of Paris of 1898 and became an unincorporated territory of the United States. In 1899, the United States Department of War conducted a census of Puerto Rico finding that the population of Retiro barrio was 983.

Historical population
Census	Pop.	Note	%±
1900	983		—
1910	885		−10.0%
1920	932		5.3%
1930	1,053		13.0%
1940	1,483		40.8%
1950	1,196		−19.4%
1960	2,116		76.9%
1970	0		−100.0%
1980	6,295		—
1990	6,229		−1.0%
2000	7,361		18.2%
2010	6,728		−8.6%
U.S. Decennial Census; 1899 (shown as 1900) 1910-1930; 1930-1950 1980-2000 2010

== See also ==
- List of communities in Puerto Rico
