= La Torre, Lares, Puerto Rico =

Barrio of Puerto Rico

La Torre
- Barrio
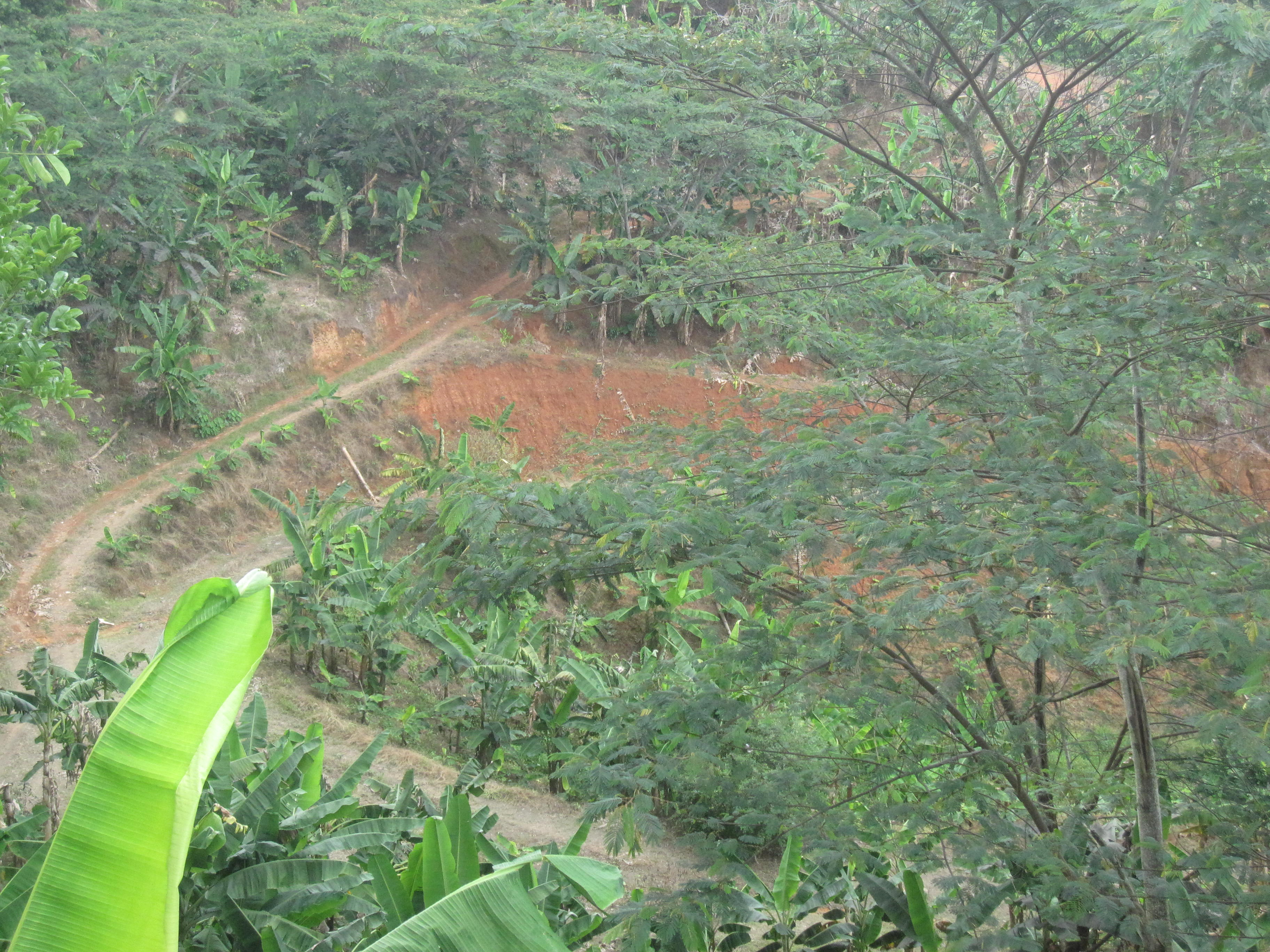
- Farmland in La Torre barrio

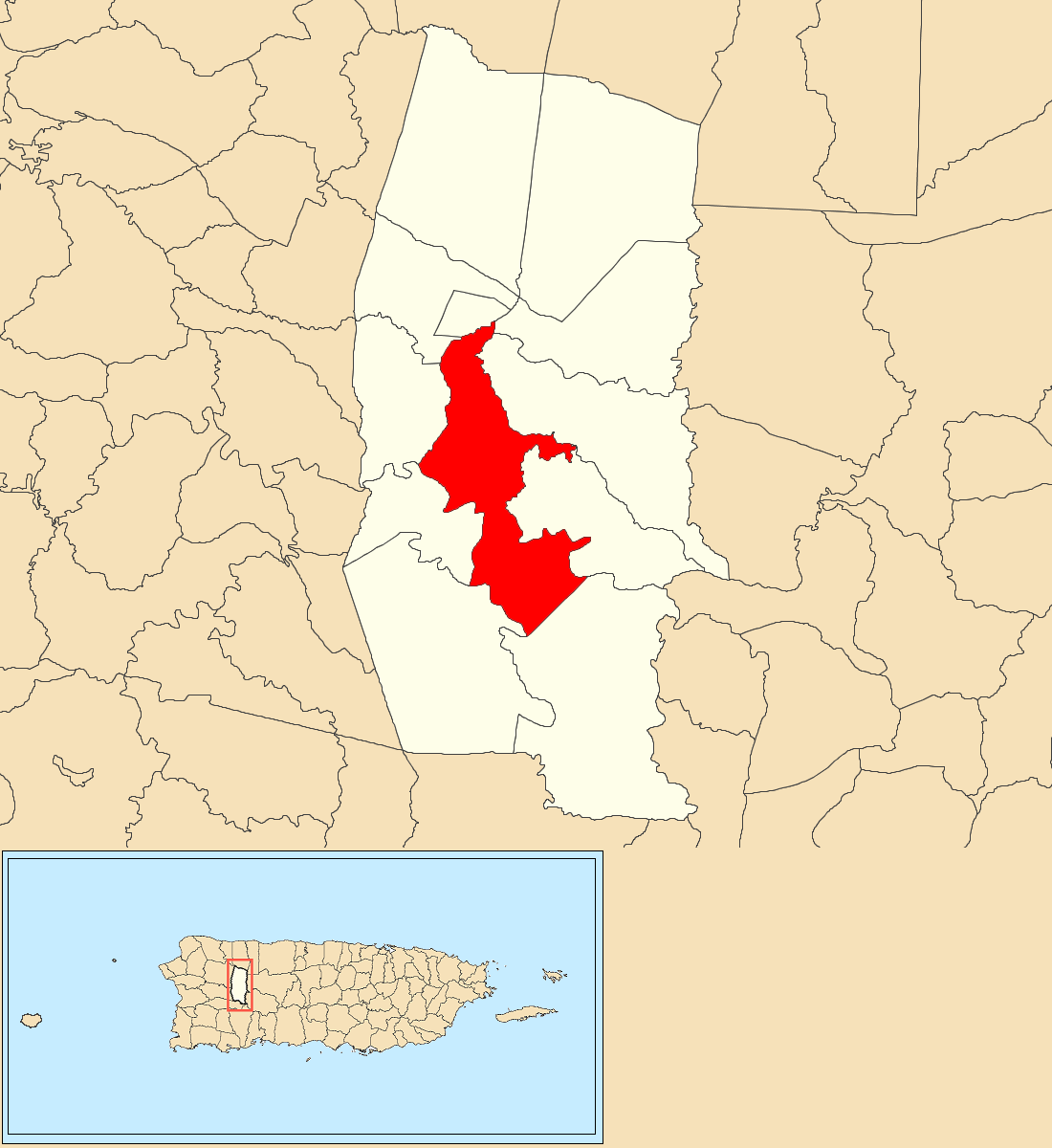
- Location of La Torre barrio within the municipality of Lares shown in red

- Location of Puerto Rico
- Coordinates: 18°15′09″N 66°52′28″W
- Commonwealth: Puerto Rico
- Municipality: Lares

Area
  - Total: 5.64 sq mi (14.6 km^{2})
  - Land: 5.64 sq mi (14.6 km^{2})
  - Water: 0 sq mi (0 km^{2})
- Elevation: 1,001 ft (305 m)

Population (2010)
  - Total: 1,574
  - Density: 279.1/sq mi (107.8/km^{2})
- Source: 2010 Census
- Time zone: UTC−4 (AST)

La Torre is a barrio in the municipality of Lares, Puerto Rico. Its population in 2010 was 1,574.

== History ==
La Torre was in Spain's gazetteers until Puerto Rico was ceded by Spain in the aftermath of the Spanish–American War under the terms of the Treaty of Paris of 1898 and became an unincorporated territory of the United States. In 1899, the United States Department of War conducted a census of Puerto Rico finding that the population of La Torre barrio was 2,008.

Historical population
Census	Pop.	Note	%±
1900	2,008		—
1910	2,156		7.4%
1920	2,838		31.6%
1930	2,557		−9.9%
1940	2,440		−4.6%
1950	2,384		−2.3%
1960	1,544		−35.2%
1970	0		−100.0%
1980	1,298		—
1990	1,621		24.9%
2000	1,725		6.4%
2010	1,574		−8.8%
U.S. Decennial Census; 1899 (shown as 1900) 1910-1930; 1930-1950 1980-2000 2010

== Sectors ==
Barrios (which are, in contemporary times, roughly comparable to minor civil divisions) and subbarrios, in turn, are further subdivided into smaller local populated place areas/units called sectores (sectors in English). The types of sectores may vary, from normally sector to urbanización to reparto to barriada to residencial, among others.

The following sectors are in La Torre barrio:

Cerro La Torre, Comunidad Los Milagros, Finca Calcerrada, Finca Delgado, Finca Ostolaza, Finca Silvestrini, Hacienda Monserrate Finca Pay Méndez, La Paragua, La Vega Calcerrada, La Vega de Los Acevedo, Las Toldas, Puente Blanco, Sector Collazo, Sector Isleta Camino Arana (Ramal 431), Sector Los Quemaos, Sector Mercedes Estades, Sector Morell, Sector Tosquero, and Tramo Carretera 128.

== Gallery ==
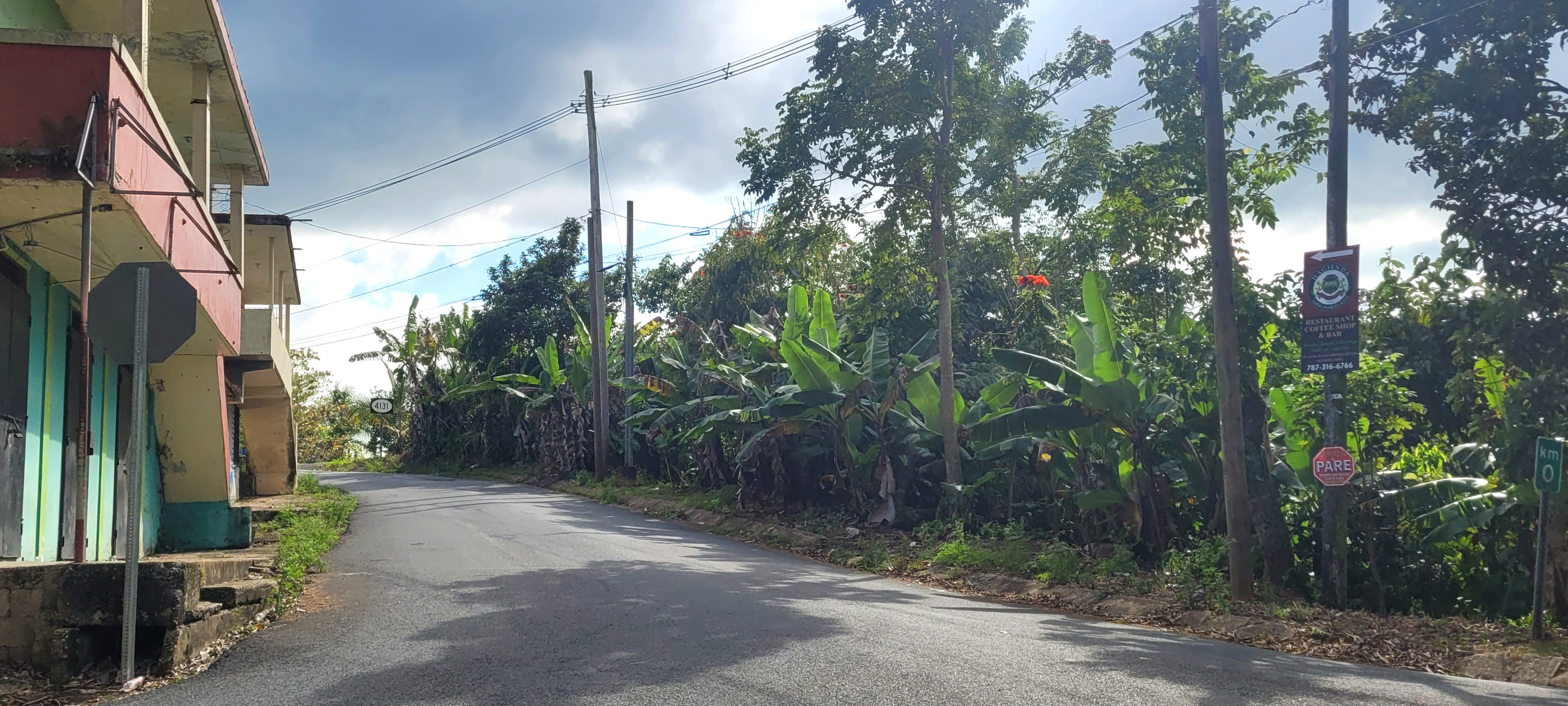
Puerto Rico Highway 4131 in La Torre

== See also ==
- List of communities in Puerto Rico
- List of barrios and sectors of Lares, Puerto Rico
