= Jácana, Yauco, Puerto Rico =

Barrio of Puerto Rico

Jácana
- Barrio
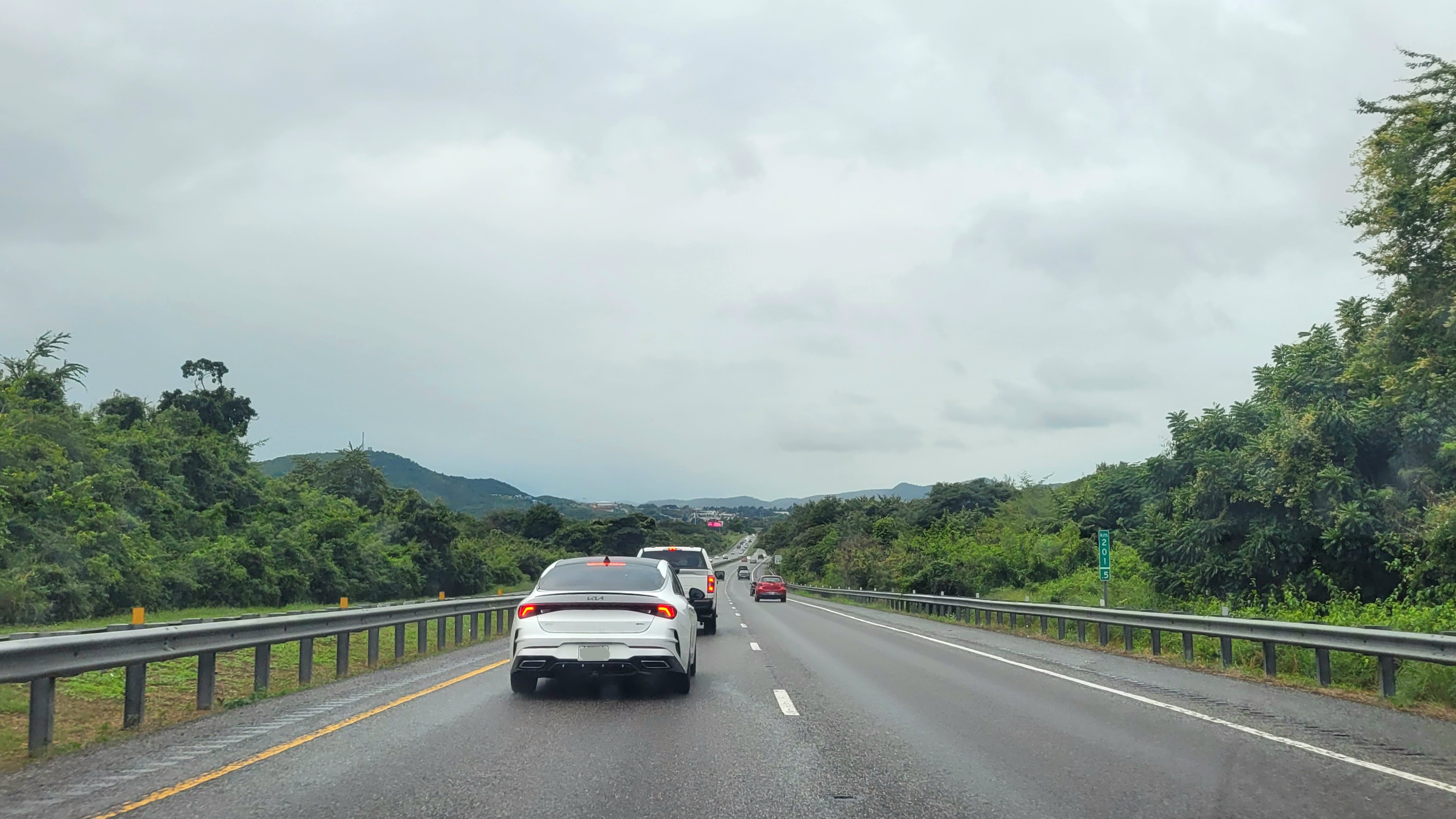
- Puerto Rico Highway 2 in Jácana

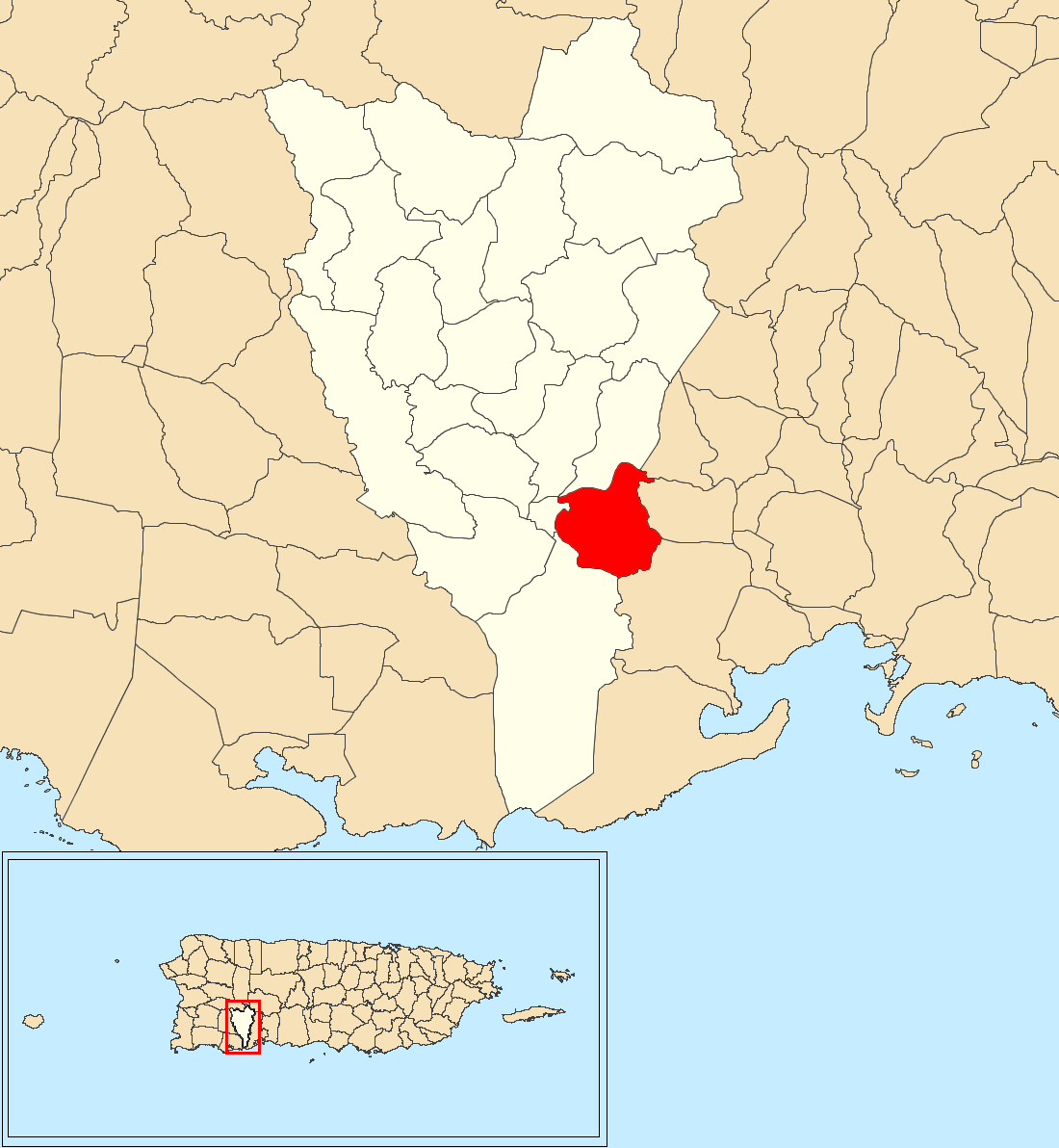
- Location of Jácana within the municipality of Yauco shown in red

- Location of Puerto Rico
- Coordinates: 18°01′54″N 66°50′02″W
- Commonwealth: Puerto Rico
- Municipality: Yauco

Area
  - Total: 2.48 sq mi (6.4 km^{2})
  - Land: 2.48 sq mi (6.4 km^{2})
  - Water: 0 sq mi (0 km^{2})
- Elevation: 128 ft (39 m)

Population (2010)
  - Total: 1,690
  - Density: 681.5/sq mi (263.1/km^{2})
- Source: 2010 Census
- Time zone: UTC−4 (AST)
- ZIP Code: 00698
- Area code: 787/939

Jácana is a barrio in the municipality of Yauco, Puerto Rico. Its population in 2010 was 1,690.

== Demographics ==
Jácana was in Spain's gazetteers until Puerto Rico was ceded by Spain in the aftermath of the Spanish–American War under the terms of the Treaty of Paris of 1898 and became an unincorporated territory of the United States. In 1899, the United States Department of War conducted a census of Puerto Rico finding that the combined population of Almácigo Alto barrio and Jácana barrio was 1,077.

Historical population
| Census | Pop. | Note | %± |
|---|---|---|---|
| 1910 | 630 | | — |
| 1920 | 637 | | 1.1% |
| 1930 | 572 | | −10.2% |
| 1940 | 683 | | 19.4% |
| 1950 | 800 | | 17.1% |
| 1960 | 992 | | 24.0% |
| 1970 | 0 | | −100.0% |
| 1980 | 1,742 | | — |
| 1990 | 1,667 | | −4.3% |
| 2000 | 1,969 | | 18.1% |
| 2010 | 1,690 | | −14.2% |
U.S. Decennial Census; 1900 (N/A) 1910-1930; 1930-1950 1980-2000 2010

== See also ==
- List of communities in Puerto Rico
