= Rayo, Sabana Grande, Puerto Rico =

Barrio of Puerto Rico

Rayo
- Barrio
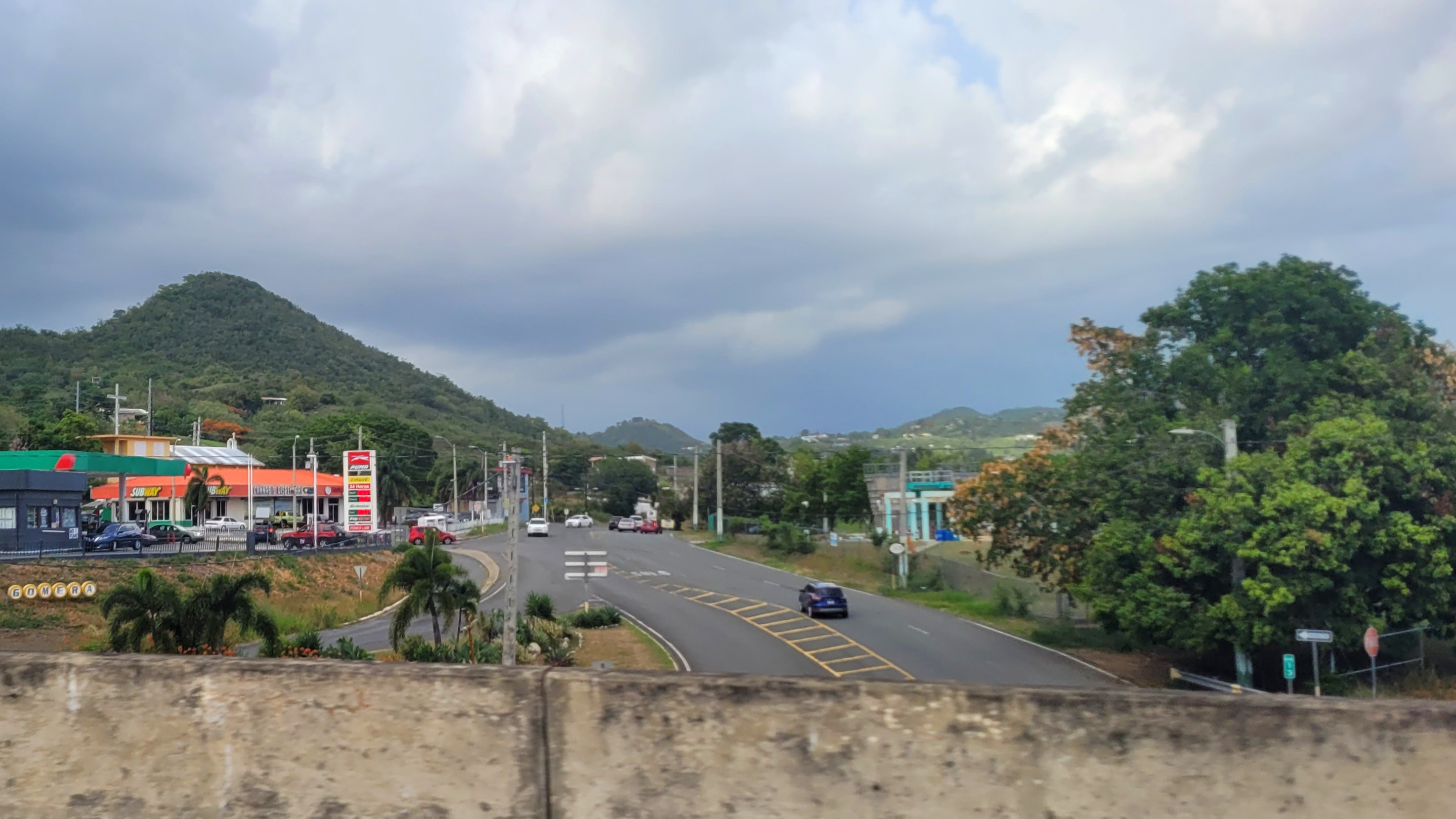
- Puerto Rico Highway 117 in Rayo

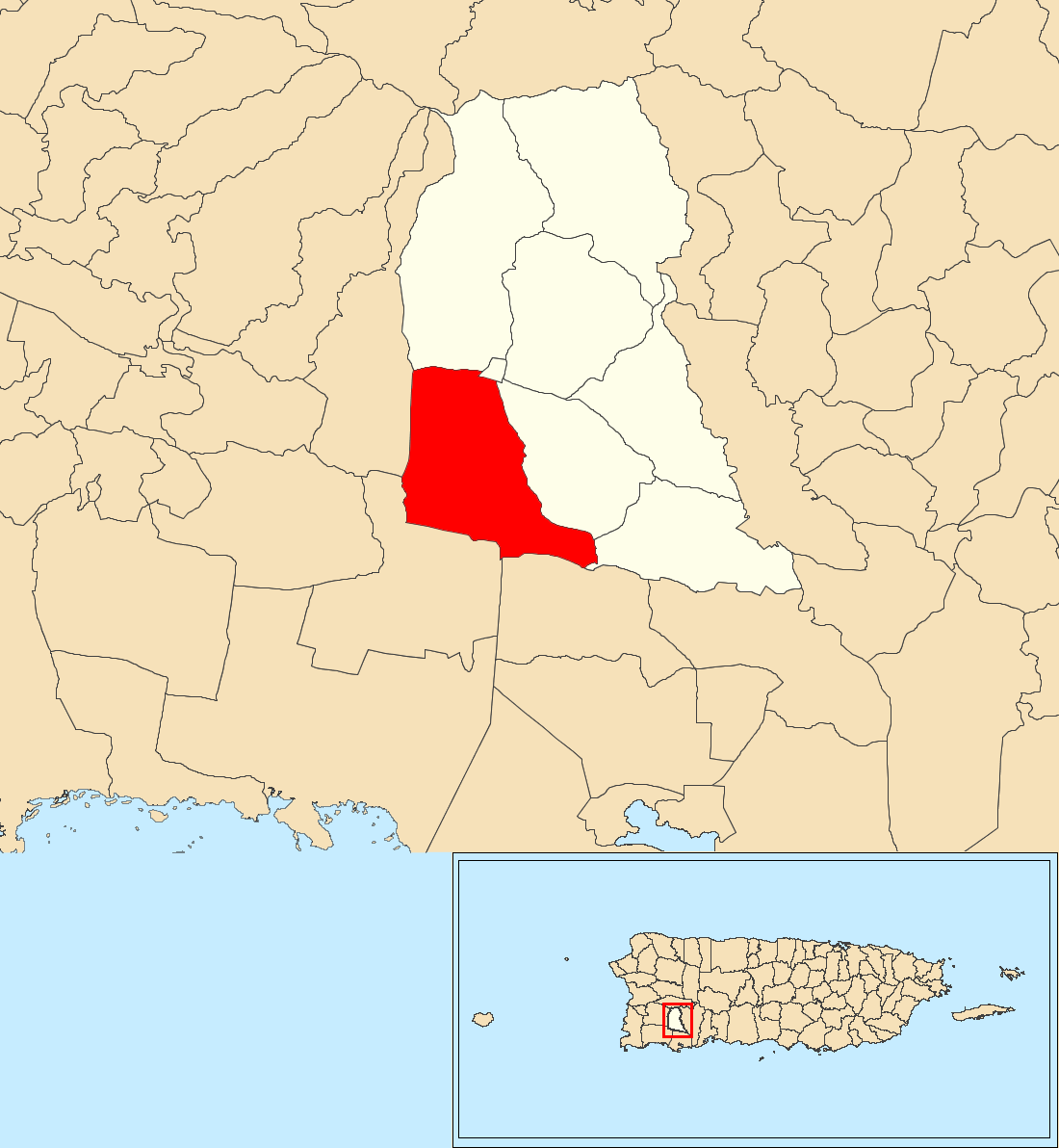
- Location of Rayo within the municipality of Sabana Grande shown in red

- Location of Puerto Rico
- Coordinates: 18°03′26″N 66°57′57″W
- Commonwealth: Puerto Rico
- Municipality: Sabana Grande

Area
  - Total: 5.73 sq mi (14.8 km^{2})
  - Land: 5.72 sq mi (14.8 km^{2})
  - Water: 0.01 sq mi (0.026 km^{2})
- Elevation: 269 ft (82 m)

Population (2010)
  - Total: 3,084
  - Density: 539.2/sq mi (208.2/km^{2})
- Source: 2010 Census
- Time zone: UTC−4 (AST)

Rayo is a barrio in the municipality of Sabana Grande, Puerto Rico. Its population in 2010 was 3,084.

== History ==
Rayo was in Spain's gazetteers until Puerto Rico was ceded by Spain in the aftermath of the Spanish–American War under the terms of the Treaty of Paris of 1898 and became an unincorporated territory of the United States. In 1899, the United States Department of War conducted a census of Puerto Rico finding that the population of Rayo barrio was 1,222.

Historical population
Census	Pop.	Note	%±
1900	1,222		—
1910	1,595		30.5%
1920	1,720		7.8%
1930	1,667		−3.1%
1940	1,751		5.0%
1950	2,297		31.2%
1960	2,010		−12.5%
1970	0		−100.0%
1980	2,224		—
1990	2,501		12.5%
2000	2,634		5.3%
2010	3,084		17.1%
U.S. Decennial Census; 1899 (shown as 1900) 1910-1930; 1930-1950 1980-2000 2010

== See also ==
- List of communities in Puerto Rico
