= Naranjo, Yauco, Puerto Rico =

Barrio of Puerto Rico

Naranjo
- Barrio
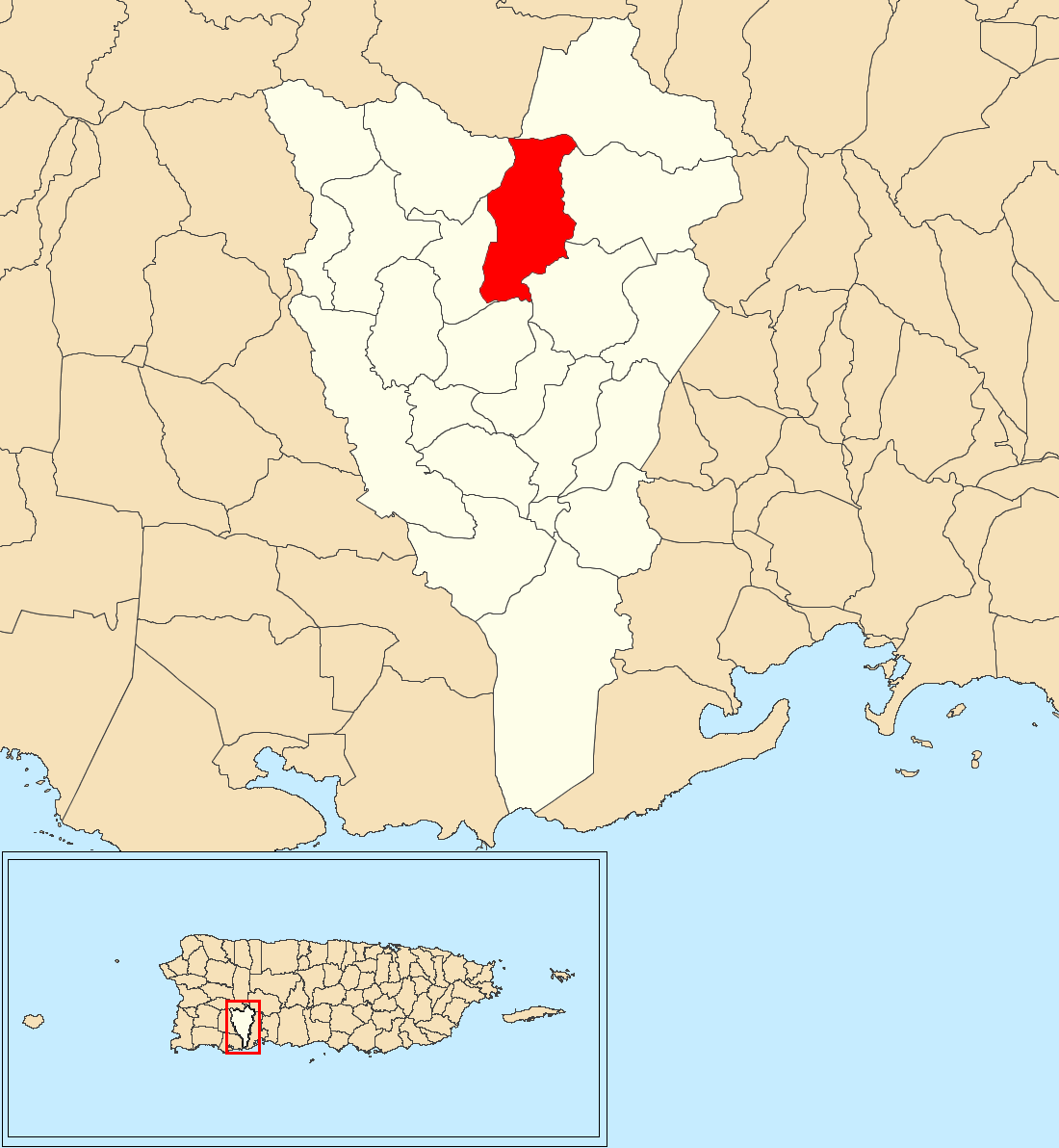
- Location of Naranjo within the municipality of Yauco shown in red

- Location of Puerto Rico
- Coordinates: 18°07′31″N 66°51′15″W
- Commonwealth: Puerto Rico
- Municipality: Yauco

Area
  - Total: 3.44 sq mi (8.9 km^{2})
  - Land: 3.31 sq mi (8.6 km^{2})
  - Water: 0.13 sq mi (0.34 km^{2})
- Elevation: 1,676 ft (511 m)

Population (2010)
  - Total: 599
  - Density: 181/sq mi (70/km^{2})
- Source: 2010 Census
- Time zone: UTC−4 (AST)
- ZIP Code: 00698
- Area code: 787/939

Naranjo is a barrio in the municipality of Yauco, Puerto Rico. Its population in 2010 was 599.

== History ==
Naranjo was in Spain's gazetteers until Puerto Rico was ceded by Spain in the aftermath of the Spanish–American War under the terms of the Treaty of Paris of 1898 and became an unincorporated territory of the United States. In 1899, the United States Department of War conducted a census of Puerto Rico finding that the population of Naranjo barrio was 1,358.

Historical population
Census	Pop.	Note	%±
1900	1,358		—
1910	1,314		−3.2%
1920	1,503		14.4%
1930	1,259		−16.2%
1940	1,192		−5.3%
1950	1,636		37.2%
1960	1,320		−19.3%
1970	1,086		−17.7%
1980	765		−29.6%
1990	682		−10.8%
2000	699		2.5%
2010	599		−14.3%
U.S. Decennial Census; 1899 (shown as 1900) 1910-1930; 1930-1950 1980-2000 2010

== See also ==
- List of communities in Puerto Rico
