= Santa Rosa, Lajas, Puerto Rico =

Barrio of Puerto Rico

Santa Rosa
- Barrio
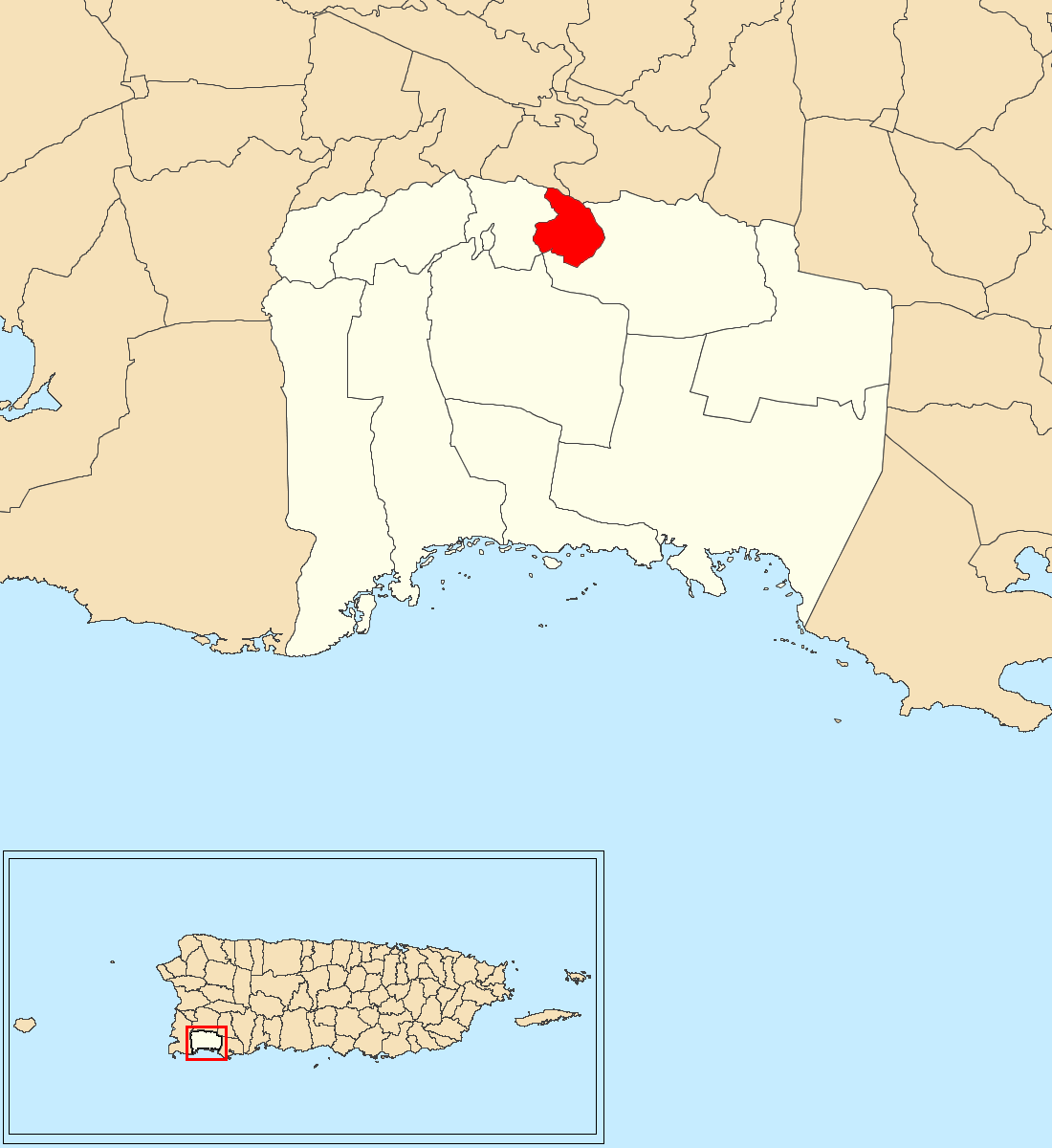
- Location of Santa Rosa within the municipality of Lajas shown in red

- Location of Puerto Rico
- Coordinates: 18°03′05″N 67°02′23″W
- Commonwealth: Puerto Rico
- Municipality: Lajas

Area
  - Total: 0.91 sq mi (2.4 km^{2})
  - Land: 0.91 sq mi (2.4 km^{2})
  - Water: 0 sq mi (0 km^{2})
- Elevation: 197 ft (60 m)

Population (2010)
  - Total: 1,603
  - Density: 1,761.5/sq mi (680.1/km^{2})
- Source: 2010 Census
- Time zone: UTC−4 (AST)

Santa Rosa is a barrio in the municipality of Lajas, Puerto Rico. Its population in 2010 was 1,603.

== History ==
Santa Rosa was in Spain's gazetteers until Puerto Rico was ceded by Spain in the aftermath of the Spanish–American War under the terms of the Treaty of Paris of 1898 and became an unincorporated territory of the United States. In 1899, the United States Department of War conducted a census of Puerto Rico finding that the combined population of Santa Rosa and Plata barrios was 938.

Historical population
Census	Pop.	Note	%±
1910	587		—
1920	587		0.0%
1930	646		10.1%
1940	905		40.1%
1950	616		−31.9%
1960	475		−22.9%
1970	1,076		126.5%
1980	1,391		29.3%
1990	1,367		−1.7%
2000	1,456		6.5%
2010	1,603		10.1%
U.S. Decennial Census; 1900 (N/A) 1910-1930; 1930-1950 1980-2000 2010

== See also ==
- List of communities in Puerto Rico
