= Plata, Lajas, Puerto Rico =

Barrio of Puerto Rico

Plata
- Barrio
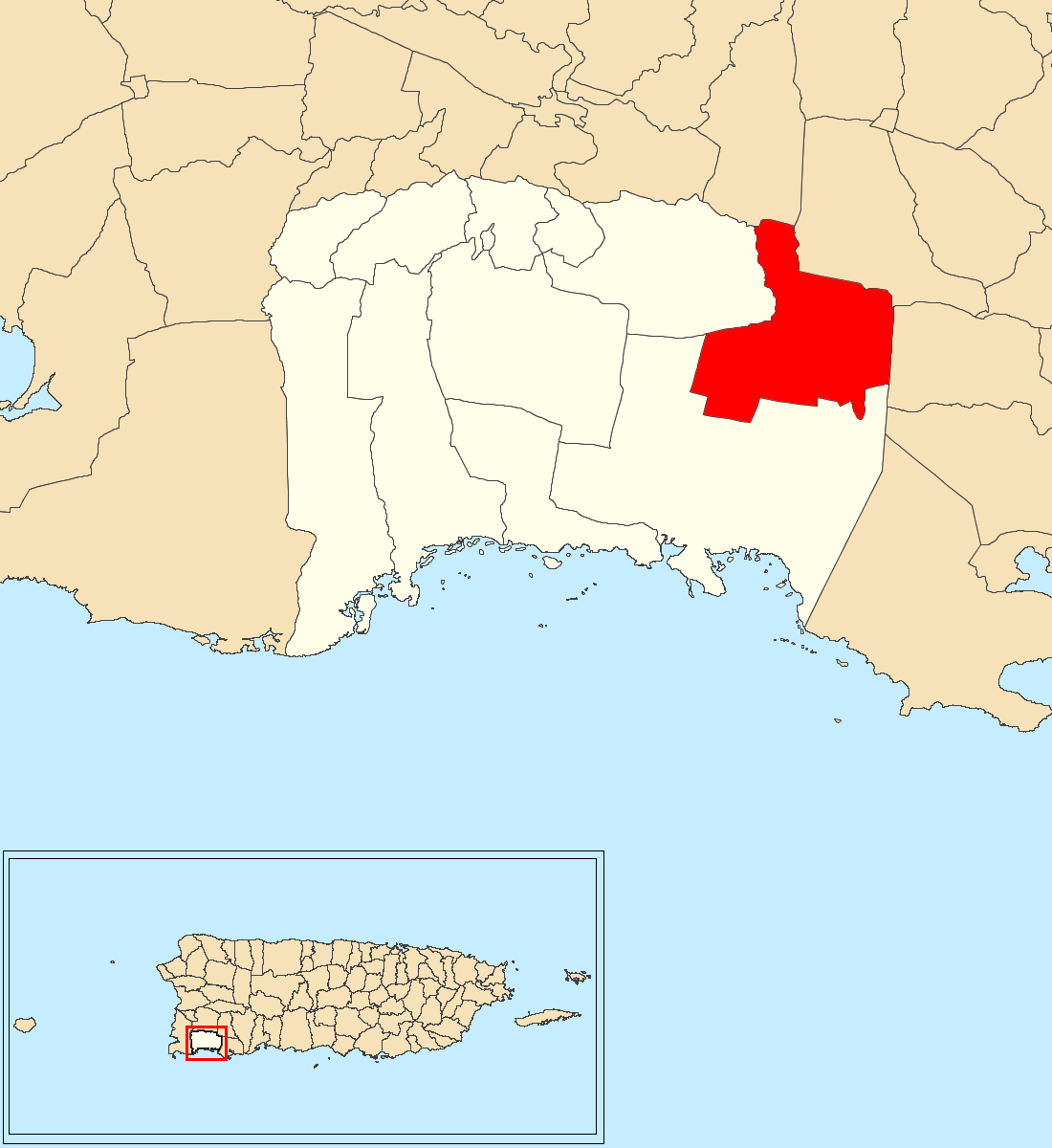
- Location of Plata within the municipality of Lajas shown in red

- Location of Puerto Rico
- Coordinates: 18°01′13″N 66°59′09″W
- Commonwealth: Puerto Rico
- Municipality: Lajas

Area
  - Total: 6.29 sq mi (16.3 km^{2})
  - Land: 6.27 sq mi (16.2 km^{2})
  - Water: 0.02 sq mi (0.052 km^{2})
- Elevation: 23 ft (7.0 m)

Population (2010)
  - Total: 2,620
  - Density: 417.9/sq mi (161.4/km^{2})
- Source: 2010 Census
- Time zone: UTC−4 (AST)

Plata is a barrio in the municipality of Lajas, Puerto Rico. Its population in 2010 was 2,620.

== History ==
Plata was in Spain's gazetteers until Puerto Rico was ceded by Spain in the aftermath of the Spanish–American War under the terms of the Treaty of Paris of 1898 and became an unincorporated territory of the United States. In 1899, the United States Department of War conducted a census of Puerto Rico finding that the combined population of Plata and Santa Rosa barrios was 1,015.

Historical population
Census	Pop.	Note	%±
1910	677		—
1920	771		13.9%
1930	1,009		30.9%
1940	1,094		8.4%
1950	1,008		−7.9%
1960	899		−10.8%
1970	935		4.0%
1980	1,773		89.6%
1990	2,308		30.2%
2000	2,655		15.0%
2010	2,620		−1.3%
U.S. Decennial Census; 1900 (N/A) 1910-1930; 1930-1950 1980-2000 2010

== See also ==
- List of communities in Puerto Rico
