= Machuchal, Sabana Grande, Puerto Rico =

Barrio of Puerto Rico

Machuchal
- Barrio
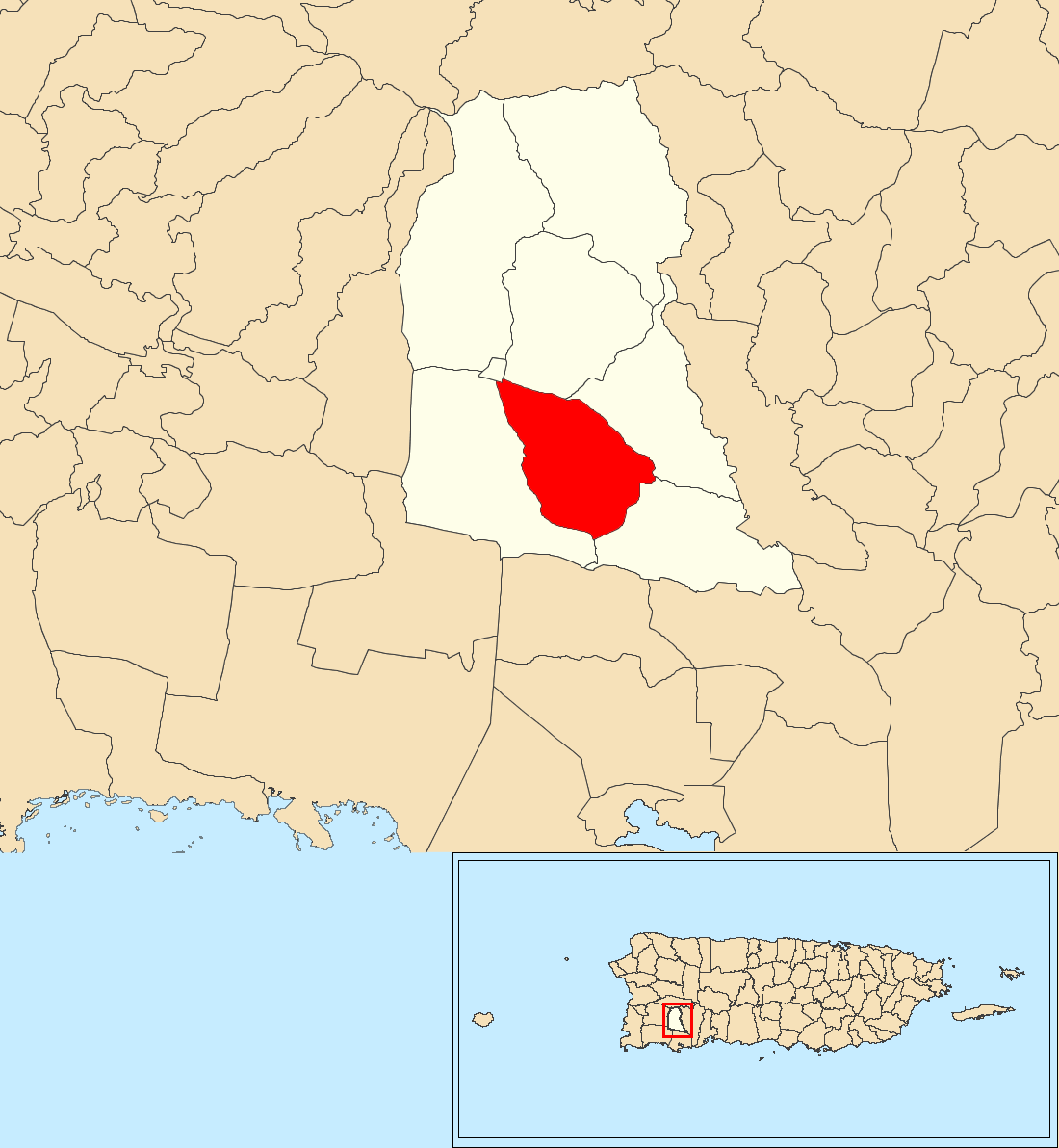
- Location of Machuchal within the municipality of Sabana Grande shown in red

- Location of Puerto Rico
- Coordinates: 18°03′23″N 66°56′27″W
- Commonwealth: Puerto Rico
- Municipality: Sabana Grande

Area
  - Total: 3.87 sq mi (10.0 km^{2})
  - Land: 3.87 sq mi (10.0 km^{2})
  - Water: 0 sq mi (0 km^{2})
- Elevation: 384 ft (117 m)

Population (2010)
  - Total: 4,773
  - Density: 1,233.3/sq mi (476.2/km^{2})
- Source: 2010 Census
- Time zone: UTC−4 (AST)

Machuchal is a barrio in the municipality of Sabana Grande, Puerto Rico. Its population in 2010 was 4,773.

== History ==
Machuchal was in Spain's gazetteers until Puerto Rico was ceded by Spain in the aftermath of the Spanish–American War under the terms of the Treaty of Paris of 1898 and became an unincorporated territory of the United States. In 1899, the United States Department of War conducted a census of Puerto Rico finding that the population of Machuchal barrio was 999.

Historical population
Census	Pop.	Note	%±
1900	999		—
1910	1,603		60.5%
1920	1,820		13.5%
1930	1,356		−25.5%
1940	1,899		40.0%
1950	2,127		12.0%
1960	2,954		38.9%
1970	0		−100.0%
1980	4,603		—
1990	4,546		−1.2%
2000	4,892		7.6%
2010	4,773		−2.4%
U.S. Decennial Census; 1899 (shown as 1900) 1910-1930; 1930-1950 1980-2000 2010

== See also ==
- List of communities in Puerto Rico
