= Diego Hernández, Yauco, Puerto Rico =

Barrio of Puerto Rico

Diego Hernández
- Barrio
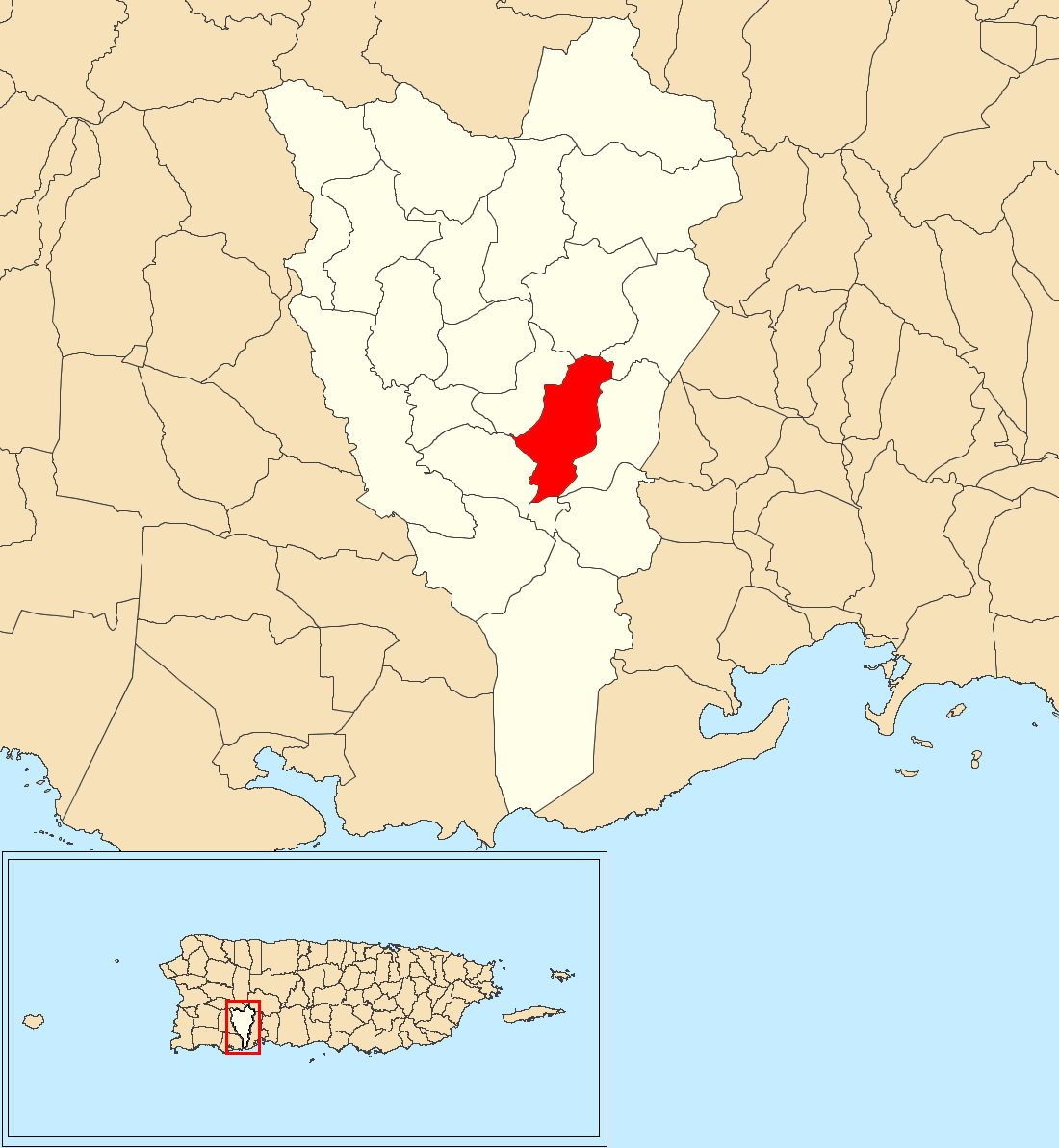
- Location of Diego Hernández within the municipality of Yauco shown in red

- Location of Puerto Rico
- Coordinates: 18°03′28″N 66°50′49″W
- Commonwealth: Puerto Rico
- Municipality: Yauco

Area
  - Total: 2.39 sq mi (6.2 km^{2})
  - Land: 2.39 sq mi (6.2 km^{2})
  - Water: 0 sq mi (0 km^{2})
- Elevation: 331 ft (101 m)

Population (2010)
  - Total: 1,247
  - Density: 521.8/sq mi (201.5/km^{2})
- Source: 2010 Census
- Time zone: UTC−4 (AST)
- ZIP Code: 00698
- Area code: 787/939

Diego Hernández is a barrio in the municipality of Yauco, Puerto Rico. Its population in 2010 was 1,247.

== History ==
Diego Hernández was in Spain's gazetteers until Puerto Rico was ceded by Spain in the aftermath of the Spanish–American War under the terms of the Treaty of Paris of 1898 and became an unincorporated territory of the United States. In 1899, the United States Department of War conducted a census of Puerto Rico finding that the combined population of Diego Hernández and Susúa Alta barrios was 1,171.

Historical population
Census	Pop.	Note	%±
1910	529		—
1920	700		32.3%
1930	985		40.7%
1940	921		−6.5%
1950	1,100		19.4%
1960	951		−13.5%
1970	0		−100.0%
1980	1,037		—
1990	1,110		7.0%
2000	1,645		48.2%
2010	1,247		−24.2%
U.S. Decennial Census; 1900 (N/A) 1910-1930; 1930-1950 1980-2000 2010

== See also ==
- List of communities in Puerto Rico
