= Lajas Arriba =

Barrio of Lajas, Puerto Rico

- Barrio
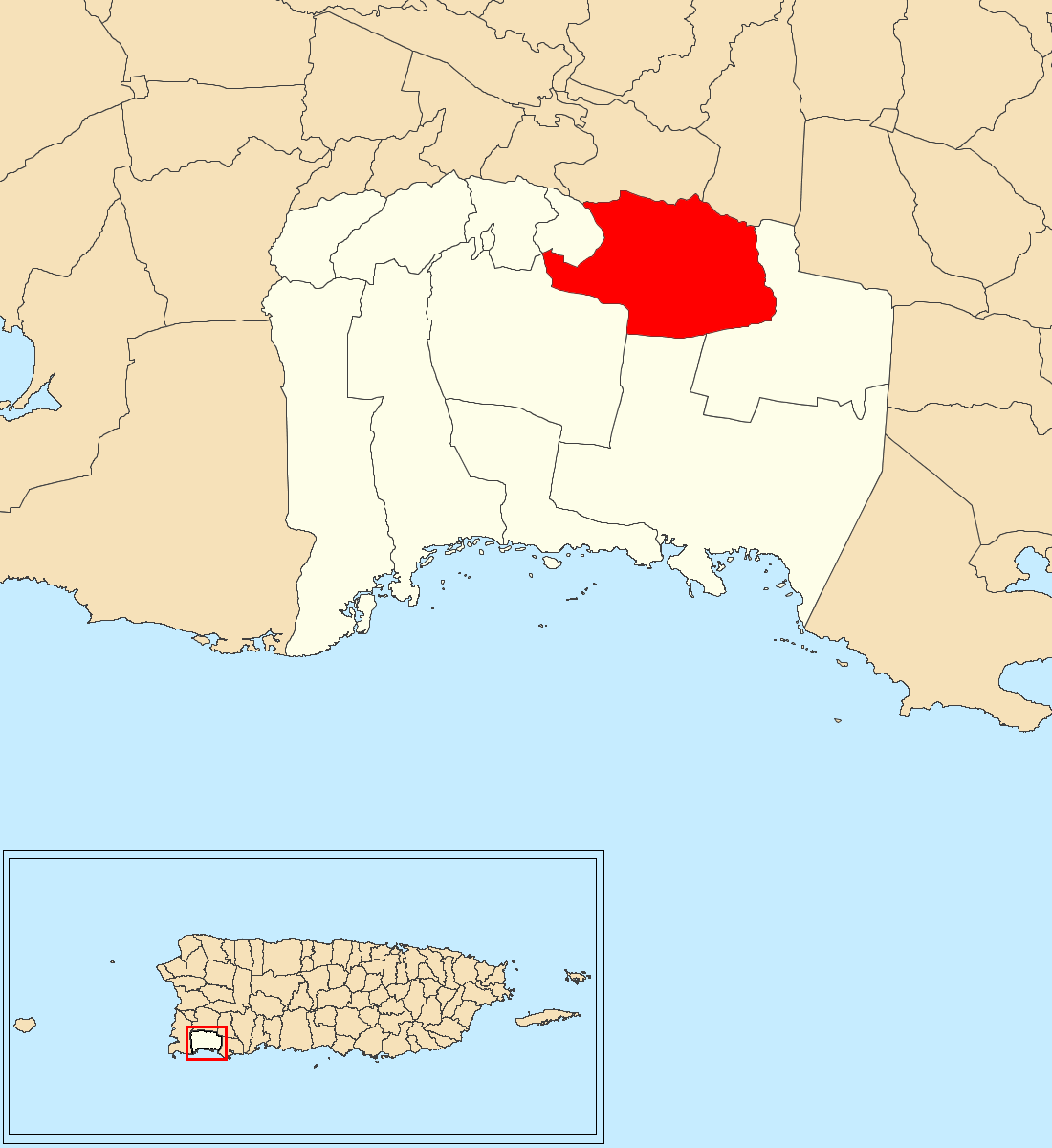
- Location of Lajas Arriba within the municipality of Lajas shown in red

- Location of Puerto Rico
- Coordinates: 18°02′31″N 67°00′48″W
- Commonwealth: Puerto Rico
- Municipality: Lajas

Area
  - Total: 6.15 sq mi (15.9 km^{2})
  - Land: 6.15 sq mi (15.9 km^{2})
  - Water: 0 sq mi (0 km^{2})
- Elevation: 118 ft (36 m)

Population (2010)
  - Total: 2,456
  - Density: 399.3/sq mi (154.2/km^{2})
- Source: 2010 Census
- Time zone: UTC−4 (AST)

Lajas Arriba is a barrio in the municipality of Lajas, Puerto Rico. Its population in 2010 was 2,456.

== History ==
Lajas Arriba was in Spain's gazetteers until Puerto Rico was ceded by Spain in the aftermath of the Spanish–American War under the terms of the Treaty of Paris of 1898 and became an unincorporated territory of the United States. In 1899, the United States Department of War conducted a census of Puerto Rico finding that the population of Lajas Arriba barrio was 1,152.

Historical population
Census	Pop.	Note	%±
1900	1,152		—
1910	1,384		20.1%
1920	1,602		15.8%
1930	1,408		−12.1%
1940	1,437		2.1%
1950	1,862		29.6%
1960	1,965		5.5%
1970	1,939		−1.3%
1980	2,139		10.3%
1990	2,273		6.3%
U.S. Decennial Census; 1899 (shown as 1900) 1910-1930; 1930-1950 1980-2000 2010

== See also ==
- List of communities in Puerto Rico
