= Susúa Alta =

Barrio of Yauco, Puerto Rico

- Barrio
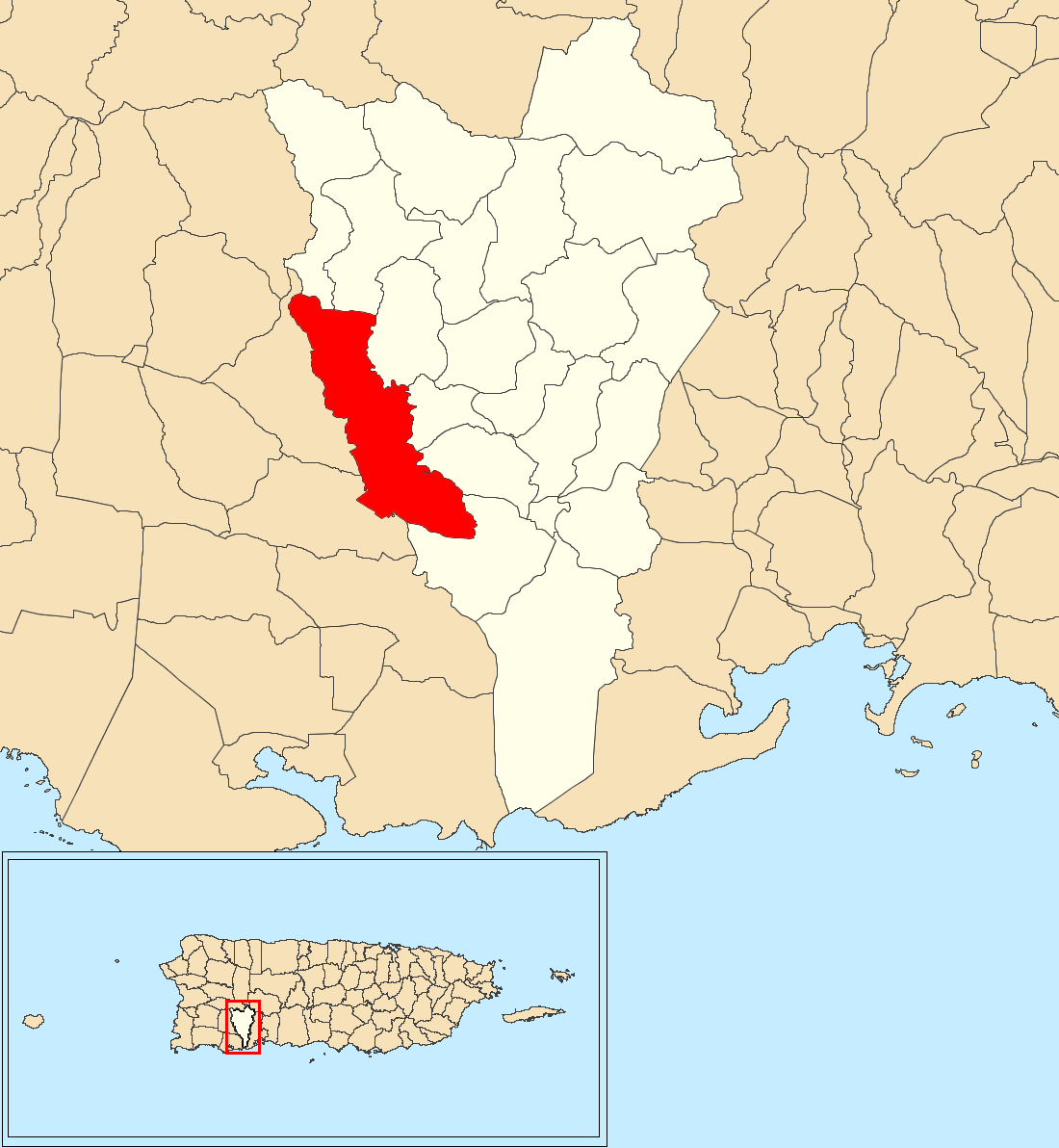
- Location of Susúa Alta within the municipality of Yauco shown in red

- Location of Puerto Rico
- Coordinates: 18°03′51″N 66°53′57″W
- Commonwealth: Puerto Rico
- Municipality: Yauco

Area
  - Total: 5.53 sq mi (14.3 km^{2})
  - Land: 5.43 sq mi (14.1 km^{2})
  - Water: 0.10 sq mi (0.26 km^{2})
- Elevation: 443 ft (135 m)

Population (2010)
  - Total: 3,719
  - Density: 701.7/sq mi (270.9/km^{2})
- Source: 2010 Census
- Time zone: UTC−4 (AST)
- ZIP Code: 00698
- Area code: 787/939

Susúa Alta is a barrio in the municipality of Yauco, Puerto Rico. Its population in 2010 was 3,719.

== History ==
Susúa Alta was in Spain's gazetteers until Puerto Rico was ceded by Spain in the aftermath of the Spanish–American War under the terms of the Treaty of Paris of 1898 and became an unincorporated territory of the United States. In 1899, the United States Department of War conducted a census of Puerto Rico finding that the combined population of Susúa Alta and Diego Hernández barrios was 1,171.

Historical population
Census	Pop.	Note	%±
1910	849		—
1920	1,047		23.3%
1930	888		−15.2%
1940	796		−10.4%
1950	787		−1.1%
1960	938		19.2%
1970	1,005		7.1%
1980	2,801		178.7%
1990	3,472		24.0%
2000	4,069		17.2%
2010	3,719		−8.6%
U.S. Decennial Census; 1900 (N/A) 1910-1930; 1930-1950 1980-2000 2010

== See also ==
- List of communities in Puerto Rico
