= Susúa Baja, Yauco, Puerto Rico =

Barrio of Puerto Rico

Susúa Baja
- Barrio
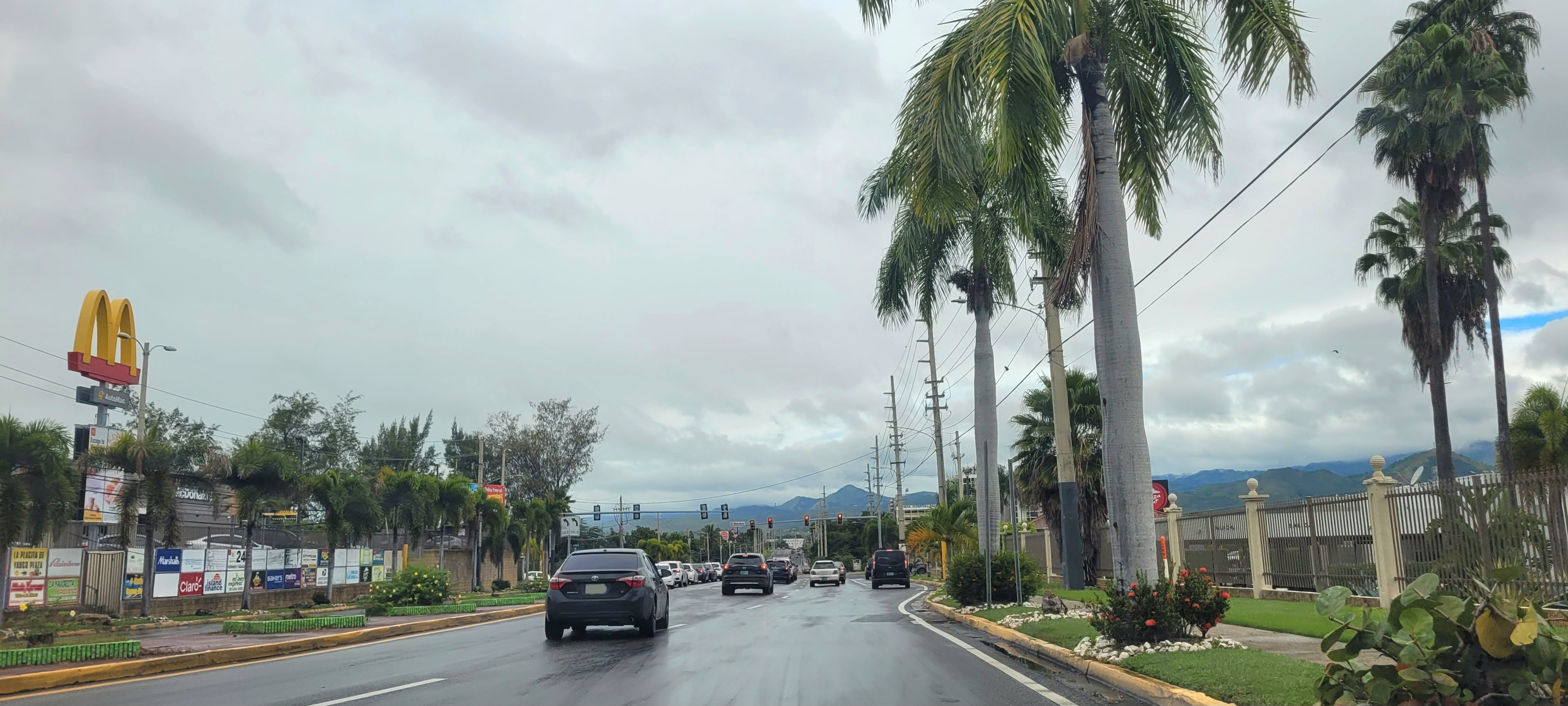
- Puerto Rico Highway 128 in Susúa Baja

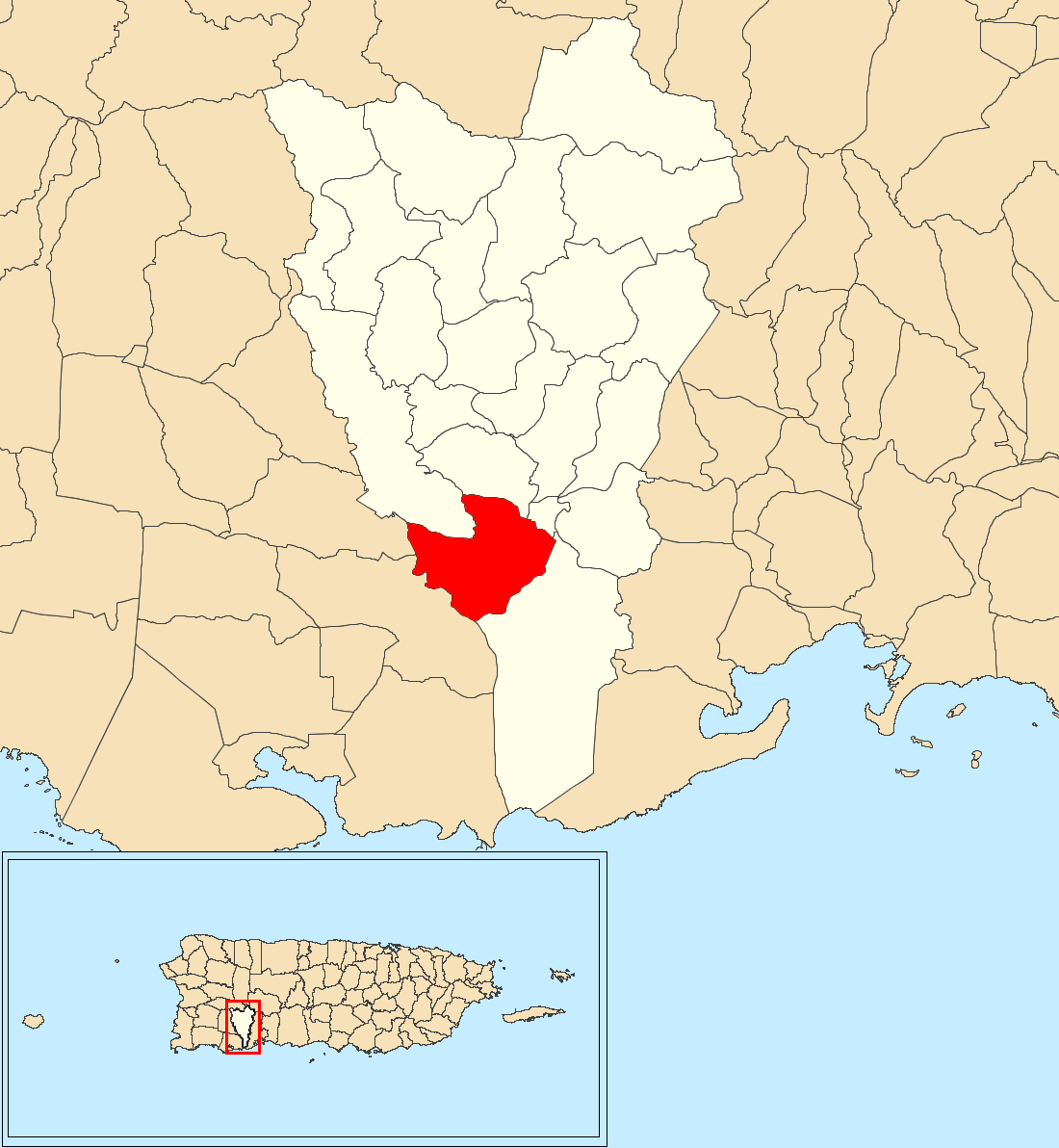
- Location of Susúa Baja within the municipality of Yauco shown in red

- Location of Puerto Rico
- Coordinates: 18°01′31″N 66°51′57″W
- Commonwealth: Puerto Rico
- Municipality: Yauco

Area
  - Total: 3.51 sq mi (9.1 km^{2})
  - Land: 3.51 sq mi (9.1 km^{2})
  - Water: 0 sq mi (0 km^{2})
- Elevation: 144 ft (44 m)

Population (2010)
  - Total: 11,856
  - Density: 3,377.8/sq mi (1,304.2/km^{2})
- Source: 2010 Census
- Time zone: UTC−4 (AST)
- ZIP Code: 00698
- Area code: 787/939

Susúa Baja is a barrio in the municipality of Yauco, Puerto Rico. Its population in 2010 was 11,856.

== History ==
Susúa Baja was in Spain's gazetteers until Puerto Rico was ceded by Spain in the aftermath of the Spanish–American War under the terms of the Treaty of Paris of 1898 and became an unincorporated territory of the United States. In 1899, the United States Department of War conducted a census of Puerto Rico finding that the population of Susúa Baja barrio was 811.

Historical population
Census	Pop.	Note	%±
1900	811		—
1930	1,245		—
1940	1,687		35.5%
1950	2,950		74.9%
1960	4,176		41.6%
1970	0		−100.0%
1980	9,416		—
1990	12,677		34.6%
2000	13,319		5.1%
2010	11,856		−11.0%
U.S. Decennial Census; 1899 (shown as 1900) 1910-1930; 1930-1950 1980-2000 2010

== See also ==
- List of communities in Puerto Rico
