= Puerto Rico Highway 102 =

Highway in Puerto Rico

Highway 102
- Ruta 102

Route information
- Maintained by Puerto Rico DTPW
- Length: 41.6 km (25.8 mi)

Major junctions
- West end: PR-104 in Miradero–Algarrobos–Mayagüez barrio-pueblo
- PR-2 in Mayagüez barrio-pueblo; PR-64 / PR-3342 in Mayagüez barrio-pueblo; PR-63 in Sábalos–Mayagüez barrio-pueblo; PR-100 in Miradero; PR-103 in Cabo Rojo barrio-pueblo–Monte Grande–Bajura; PR-318 in Maresúa; PR-114 in Sabana Grande Abajo–Maresúa; PR-166 in Sabana Grande Abajo–Maresúa; PR-122 in Retiro; PR-2 in Minillas
- East end: PR-121 / PR-368 in Sabana Grande barrio-pueblo

Location
- Country: United States
- Territory: Puerto Rico
- Municipalities: Mayagüez, Cabo Rojo, San Germán, Sabana Grande

Highway system
- Roads in Puerto Rico; List
← PR-101	→ PR-103

Puerto Rico Highway 102 (PR-102) is a main highway in the southwestern portion of the Porta del Sol region of Puerto Rico. It begins at Puerto Rico Highway 2 north of central Mayagüez and runs through the municipalities of Cabo Rojo and San Germán, coming to an end in downtown Sabana Grande.

== Route description ==
=== Mayagüez ===
PR-102 begins as a short two-lane road at an intersection with north of the Mar y Sol neighborhood. The road travels southwest down a relatively steep slope for approximately 0.23 miles where it comes to an intersection with the six-lane, north–south, arterial Avenida Comercio/PR-64 and the secondary, east–west, Calle Concordia/PR-3342. PR-102 replaces PR-64 southbound into where it runs through the Concordia Public Housing Complex until reaching a crossing at Yagüez River where it enters the industrial area immediately west of central Mayagüez. After crossing the Yagüez, the road decreases to four-lanes unofficially since there is an absence of pavement markings along this stretch. It is through this area that PR-102 has direct access to two of downtown Mayagüez's major streets Calle Méndez Vigo and Calle de la Candelaria, formerly McKinley Street. A half mile south of the river crossing, PR-102 enters a new traffic pattern and once again becomes a six-lane divided boulevard named Bulevar Guanajibo which travels directly adjacent to the numerous public housing complexes in the area. This area is currently under construction in preparation for hosting the 2010 Central American and Caribbean Games which includes the construction of two new stadiums and a waterfront promenade. Further south, after crossing the Guanajibo River, the route retains its name but once again becomes a two-lane road as it passes through Mayagüez's coastal neighborhoods.

=== Cabo Rojo ===
PR-102 continues to run south along the coastline where it enters Cabo Rojo, eventually passing through the seaside resort and fishing village of Joyuda. After leaving Joyuda, PR-102 curves eastward as Calle Pedro Albizu Campos. The highway intersects PR-100 just outside downtown Cabo Rojo. It enters the town as Calle Nuevo Carbonell and shares some of its length with PR-103 for a little over a half mile.

=== San Germán ===
Once exiting the town, the route travels a short distance through countryside until entering downtown San Germán as Calle Comercio Luna.

=== Sabana Grande ===
After leaving San Germán, the road once again travels through rural communities until it intersects PR-2 just outside downtown Sabana Grande. It enters Sabana Grande as Calle Francisco Mariano Quiñones, where it terminates south of the town plaza at the intersection of Calle 65 de Infanteria (65th Infantry Street)/PR-120 and PR-121 which continues along Francisco Mariano Quinon Street.

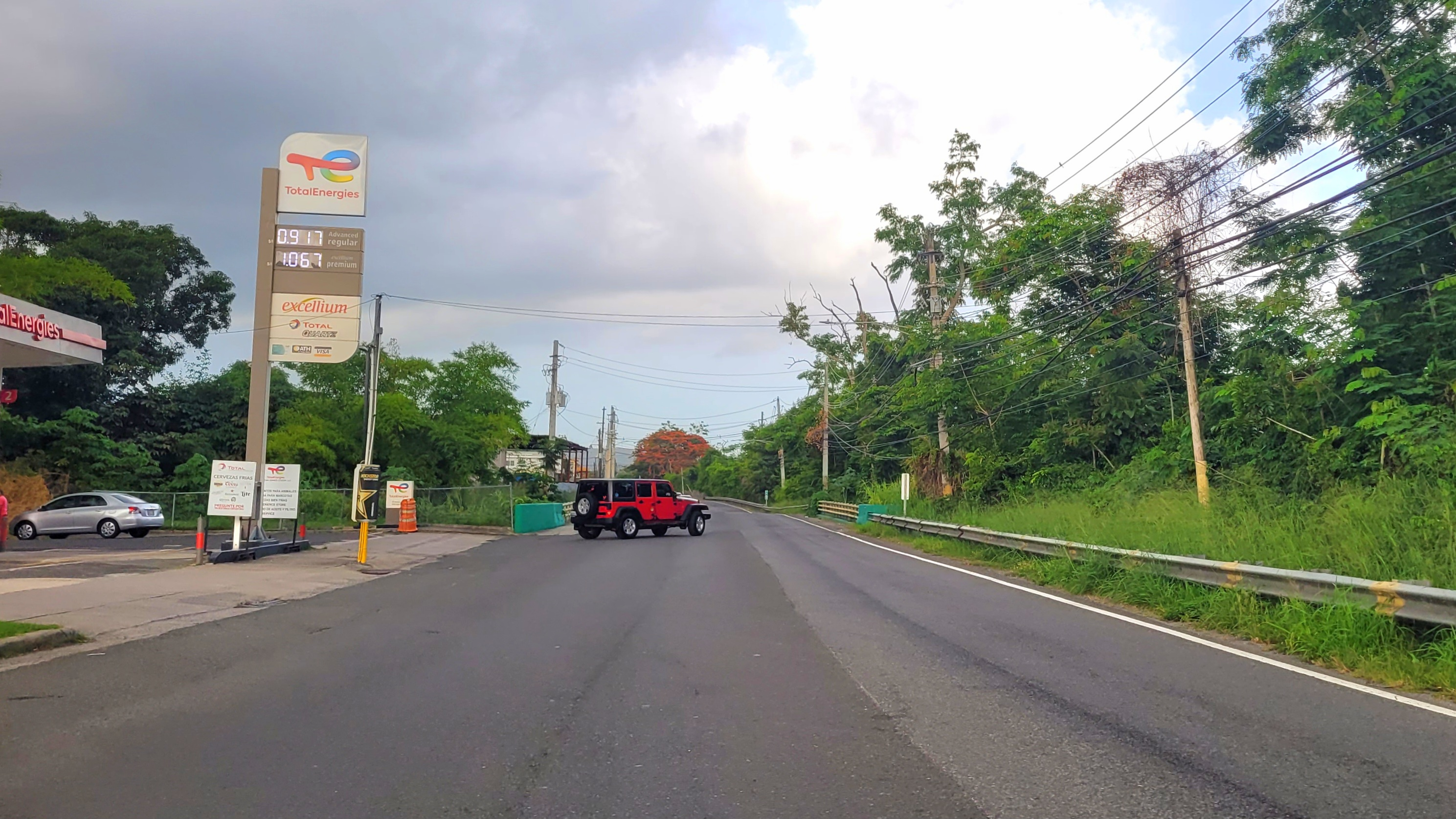
PR-102 east between Santana and Rayo barrios

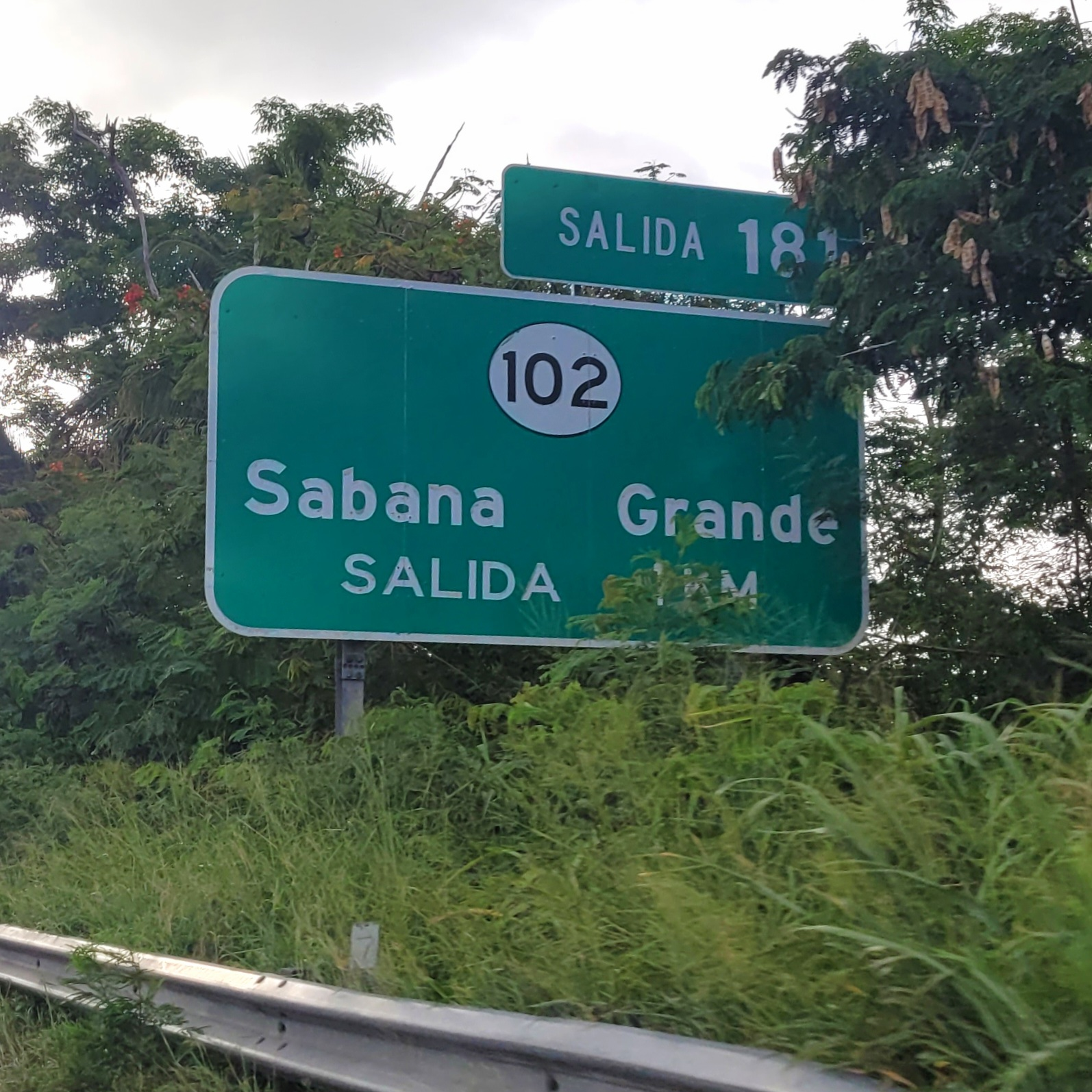
PR-2 west approaching exit 181 to PR-102 in Rayo barrio

== Major intersections ==
Municipality	Location	km	mi	Destinations	Notes
Mayagüez	Miradero–Algarrobos– Mayagüez barrio-pueblo tripoint	0.0	0.0	PR-104 (Carretera Dr. Victoriano Quintana Muñiz) – Mayagüez	Western terminus of PR-102
Mayagüez	Mayagüez barrio-pueblo	0.3	0.19	PR-2 (Expreso Miguel A. García Méndez) – Mayagüez, Aguadilla	No left turn from PR-2 southbound; no access across PR-2
Mayagüez	Mayagüez barrio-pueblo	0.6– 0.7	0.37– 0.43	PR-64 (Avenida Alcalde Benjamín Cole Vázquez) / PR-3342 (Calle Concordia) to PR-3341 – Mayagüez	
Mayagüez	Mayagüez barrio-pueblo	1.6– 1.7	0.99– 1.1	PR-3342 (Calle Concordia) – Mayagüez	
Mayagüez	Sábalos–Mayagüez barrio-pueblo line	3.5	2.2	PR-63 (Avenida William C. Dunscombe) – Hormigueros, Aguadilla	
Cabo Rojo	Miradero	17.3	10.7	PR-308 – Puerto Real	
Cabo Rojo	Miradero	19.3	12.0	PR-100 (Avenida Antonio J. "Tony" Fas Alzamora) – Cabo Rojo, Mayagüez	
Cabo Rojo	Cabo Rojo barrio-pueblo–Bajura– Miradero tripoint	20.1	12.5	PR-311 – Guanajibo	
Cabo Rojo	Cabo Rojo barrio-pueblo	20.4	12.7	PR-103 (Calle Salvador Brau) – Boquerón	Western terminus of PR-103 concurrency
Cabo Rojo	Monte Grande–Bajura line	21.3	13.2	PR-103 – Hormigueros	Eastern terminus of PR-103 concurrency
Cabo Rojo	Monte Grande–Bajura line	24.8	15.4	PR-310 – Monte Grande	
San Germán	Maresúa–Sabana Eneas line	27.6	17.1	PR-317 – Hormigueros	
San Germán	Maresúa	28.8	17.9	PR-314 – Cotuí	
San Germán	Maresúa	29.6	18.4	PR-318 south – Lajas	
San Germán	Sabana Grande Abajo–Maresúa line	29.9	18.6	PR-114 west – Hormigueros, Mayagüez	
San Germán	Sabana Grande Abajo–Maresúa line	30.8– 30.9	19.1– 19.2	PR-166 east (Avenida Jorge Alberto Ramos Comas) – Sabana Grande	
San Germán	San Germán barrio-pueblo	31.8– 31.9	19.8– 19.8	PR-101 (Calle Lorencita Ramírez de Arellano) – Lajas	
San Germán	San Germán barrio-pueblo	32.1	19.9	PR-347 (Avenida del Veterano) – Sabana Grande Abajo	One-way street
San Germán	San Germán barrio-pueblo	32.4	20.1	PR-360 (Calle Luz Celenia Tirado) – Caín Bajo	
San Germán	Retiro	32.9	20.4	PR-122 – Mayagüez, Ponce	
San Germán	Retiro	35.1– 35.2	21.8– 21.9	PR-118 – Lajas	
San Germán	Retiro	35.3	21.9	PR-329 – Minillas	
San Germán	Minillas	37.1	23.1	PR-3363 – Soltero	
San Germán	Minillas	39.2	24.4	PR-2 (Expreso Roberto Sánchez Vilella) – Mayagüez, Ponce	PR-2 exit 181; diamond interchange
Sabana Grande	Rayo–Santana line	40.0	24.9	PR-363 – Santana	
Sabana Grande	Sabana Grande barrio-pueblo	41.6	25.8	PR-121 south (Avenida Vicente Quilinche) – Yauco	Eastern terminus of PR-102, western terminus of PR-121 and PR-368
Sabana Grande	Sabana Grande barrio-pueblo	41.6	25.8	PR-368 (Calle Francisco Mariano Quiñones) – Yauco	Continuation beyond PR-121
1.000 mi = 1.609 km; 1.000 km = 0.621 mi: Concurrency terminus; Incomplete access
