= Puerto Rico Highway 100 =

Highway in Puerto Rico

Highway 100
- Ruta 100
- Avenida Antonio J. "Tony" Fas Alzamora

Route information
- Maintained by Puerto Rico DTPW
- Length: 16.3 km (10.1 mi)

Major junctions
- South end: PR-301 in Boquerón
- PR-101 in Boquerón; PR-308 in Pedernales–Miradero; PR-102 in Miradero; PR-311 in Miradero–Guanajibo; PR-311 in Guanajibo
- North end: PR-2 in Guanajibo

Location
- Country: United States
- Territory: Puerto Rico
- Municipalities: Cabo Rojo, Hormigueros

Highway system
- Roads in Puerto Rico; List
← PR-66	→ PR-101

Puerto Rico Highway 100 (PR-100) is a secondary highway in southwestern Puerto Rico, located mostly in the municipality of Cabo Rojo. This highway extends from PR-2 in Hormigueros, Puerto Rico and ends at PR-301.

== Route description ==
Beginning at its intersection with PR-2 in Hormigueros, the highway runs south for about 16 kilometers and is the main gateway to local tourist destinations such as Boquerón, Combate (via PR-301 and PR-3301) and Puerto Real. It also connects PR-2 to PR-102. It is divided between PR-2 and PR-308, then it has segments of three lanes (2 to go and 1 returning, and later backwards) and two lanes. It ends at PR-301.

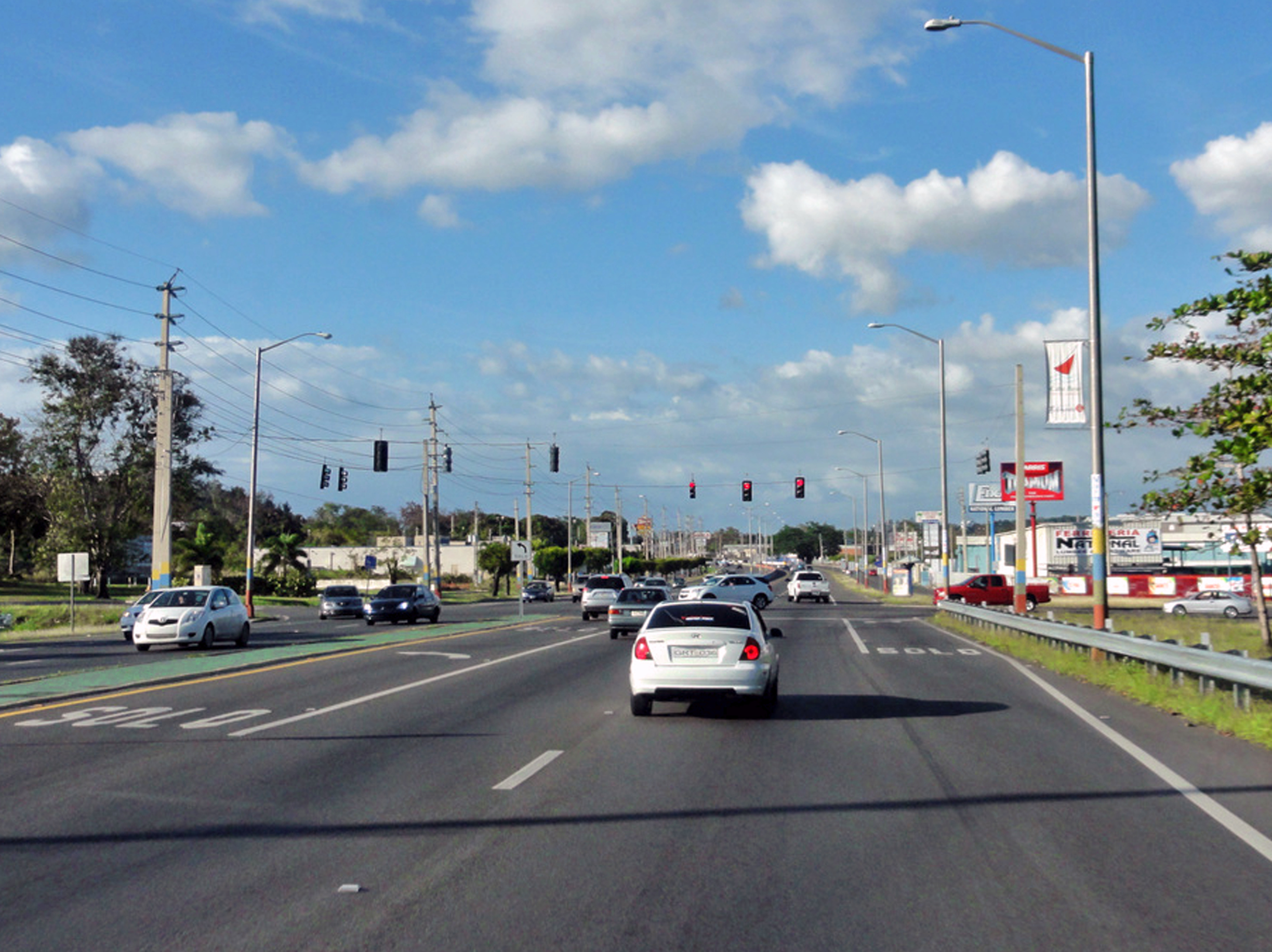
Puerto Rico Highway 100 in Cabo Rojo

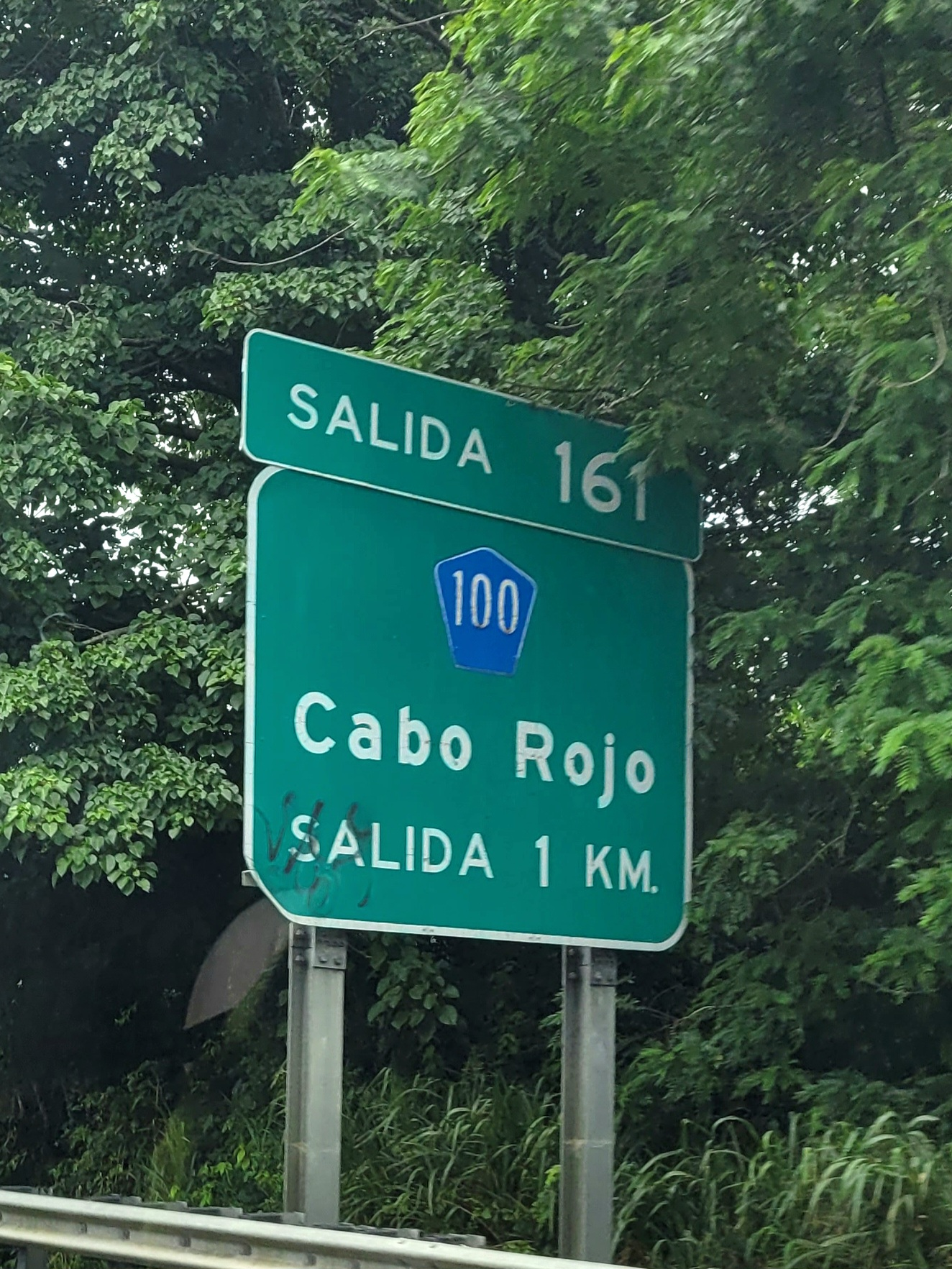
PR-2 west approaching PR-100 in Hormigueros

== Major intersections ==
Municipality	Location	km	mi	Destinations	Notes
Cabo Rojo	Boquerón	16.3	10.1	PR-301 (Carretera Antonio J. "Tony" Fas Alzamora) – Combate	Southern terminus of PR-100; seagull intersection
Cabo Rojo	Boquerón	15.0	9.3	PR-101 east – Lajas	Eastern terminus of PR-101 concurrency; seagull intersection
Cabo Rojo	Boquerón	14.6	9.1	PR-101 – Boquerón	Western terminus of PR-101 concurrency; seagull intersection
Cabo Rojo	Pedernales	9.9	6.2	To PR-103 / PR-Camino Vicente Torres – Pedernales	
Cabo Rojo	Pedernales–Miradero line	8.3	5.2	PR-308 (Avenida Don Santos Ortiz Montalvo) – Cabo Rojo	
Cabo Rojo	Miradero	7.4– 7.3	4.6– 4.5	PR-102 (Calle Pedro Albizu Campos) – Cabo Rojo, Joyuda	
Cabo Rojo	Miradero–Guanajibo line	4.6	2.9	PR-311 – Cabo Rojo	
Cabo Rojo	Guanajibo	3.6	2.2	PR-311 to PR-3311 – Guanajibo	
Hormigueros	Guanajibo	0.0	0.0	PR-2 (Expreso Eugenio María de Hostos) – Mayagüez, Ponce	Northern terminus of PR-100; PR-2 exit 161; trumpet interchange
1.000 mi = 1.609 km; 1.000 km = 0.621 mi: Concurrency terminus

== See also ==
- Tony Fas Alzamora
