= Puerto Rico Highway 122 =

Highway in Puerto Rico

Highway 122
- Ruta 122

Route information
- Maintained by Puerto Rico DTPW
- Length: 6.7 km (4.2 mi)

Southern segment
- South end: PR-116 in Lajas
- North end: PR-321 in Lajas–Ancones

Northern segment
- South end: PR-166 in Retiro
- Major intersections: PR-102 in Retiro; PR-362 in Guamá–Caín Alto
- North end: PR-2 in Caín Alto

Location
- Country: United States
- Territory: Puerto Rico
- Municipalities: Lajas, San Germán

Highway system
- Roads in Puerto Rico; List
← PR-121	→ PR-123

Puerto Rico Highway 122 (PR-122) is a north–south road between the municipalities of San Germán and Lajas, Puerto Rico. In San Germán, it begins at PR-2 and ends at PR-166, and in Lajas, it extends from PR-116 to PR-321. When completed, it will be extend from PR-116 at its southern terminus to PR-2 interchange in the northern end.

== Route description ==
PR-122 is mostly an avenue connecting downtown San Germán with PR-2. After intersecting with PR-166, the avenue ends and the highway becomes a narrow, rural road until its end. On June 22, 2023, the Governor of Puerto Rico announced that a budget has been assigned to build the last segment of PR-122 between San Germán and Lajas at an estimated cost of $53.3 million. This new route will facilitate access to Lajas, creating an alternative route to PR-101.

== Major intersections ==
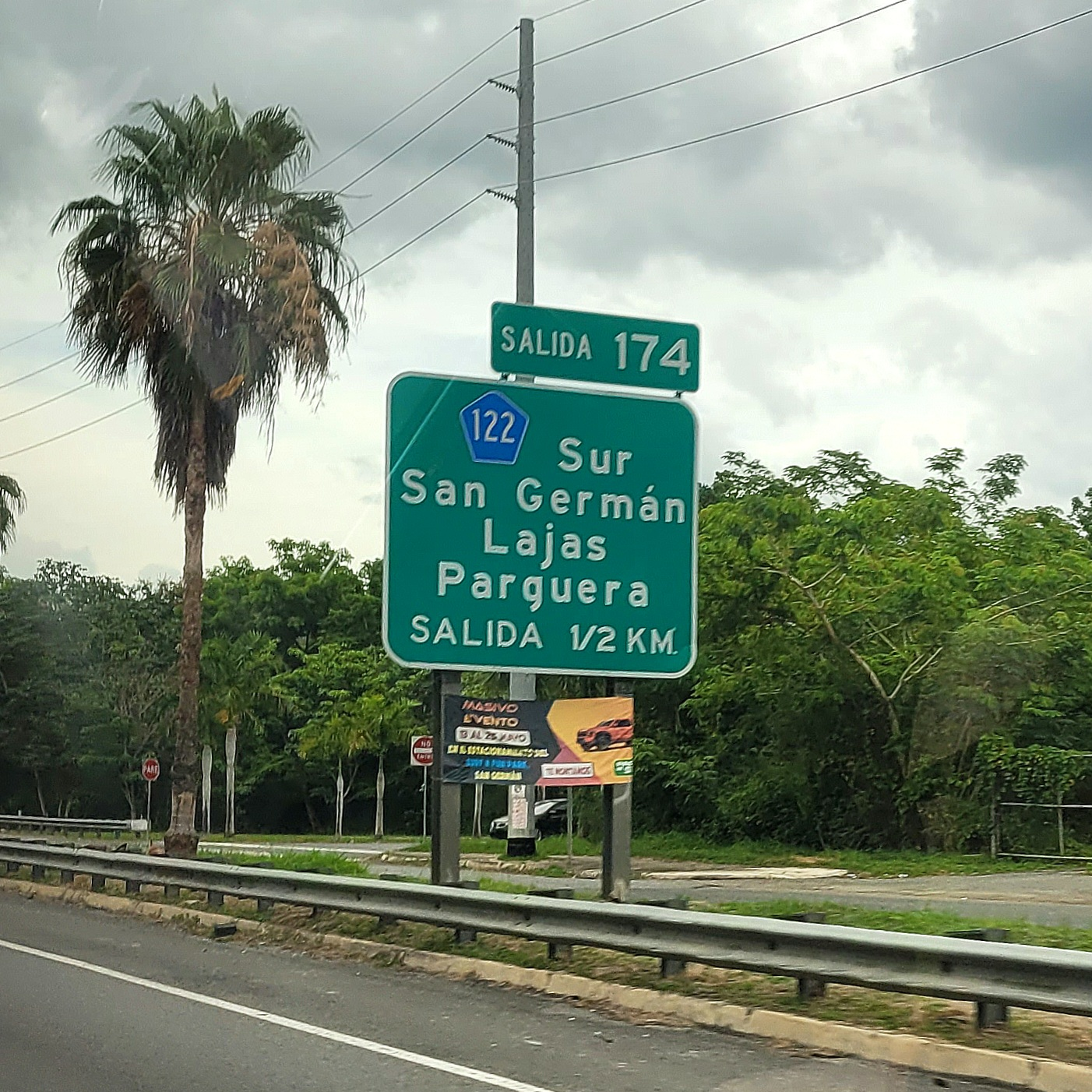
PR-2 west approaching PR-122 interchange in Caín Alto, San Germán

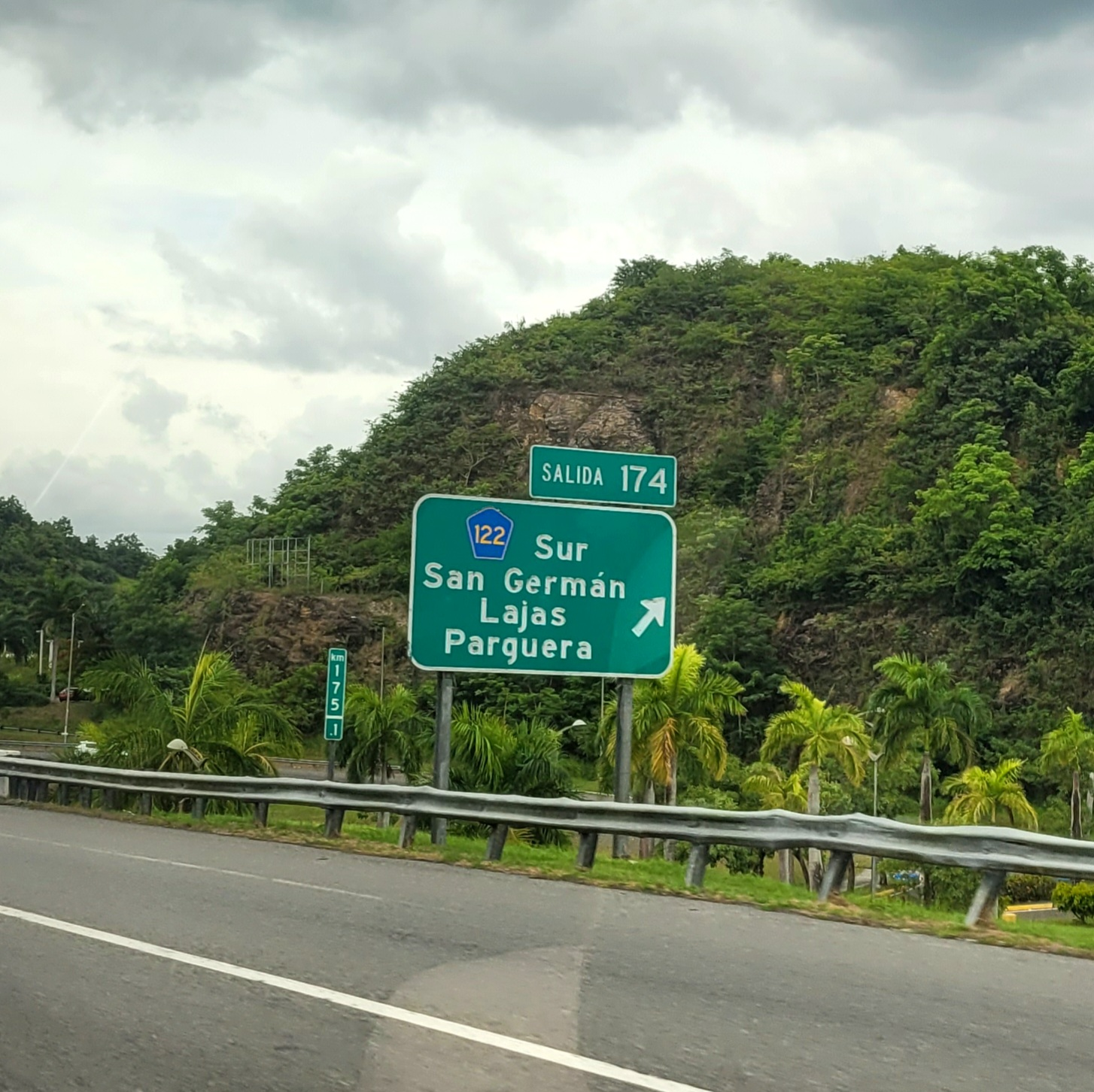
PR-2 west at PR-122 interchange in Caín Alto, San Germán

Municipality	Location	km	mi	Destinations	Notes
Lajas	Lajas	6.7	4.2	PR-116 (Avenida Manuel "Pito" Pagán Ramírez) – Lajas, Guánica	Southern terminus of PR-122; seagull intersection
Lajas–San Germán municipal line	Lajas–Ancones line	4.7	2.9	PR-321 – San Germán, Santa Rosa	Northern terminus of southern segment
Temporary gap in PR-122
San Germán	Retiro	1.9	1.2	PR-166 west (Avenida Jorge Alberto Ramos Comas) – San Germán	Southern terminus of northern segment
San Germán	Retiro	1.4	0.87	PR-102 (Avenida Universidad Interamericana) – San Germán, Sabana Grande	Northern terminus of PR-122 through Avenida Ángel René "Yino" Antongiorgi Quiñones; southern terminus of PR-122 through Avenida Ángel Casto Pérez
San Germán	Guamá–Caín Alto line	0.6	0.37	PR-362 (Avenida Aurelio Tió) – Guamá	
San Germán	Caín Alto	0.0	0.0	PR-2 (Expreso Roberto Sánchez Vilella) – Mayagüez, Ponce	Northern terminus of PR-122; PR-2 exit 174; partial cloverleaf interchange
1.000 mi = 1.609 km; 1.000 km = 0.621 mi: Route transition; Unopened
