= Puerto Rico Highway 63 =

Highway in Puerto Rico

Highway 63
- Ruta 63
- Avenida William C. Dunscombe

Route information
- Maintained by Puerto Rico DTPW
- Length: 0.60 km (0.37 mi; 2,000 ft)

Major junctions
- West end: PR-102 in Sábalos–Mayagüez barrio-pueblo
- East end: PR-2 in Mayagüez barrio-pueblo

Location
- Country: United States
- Territory: Puerto Rico
- Municipalities: Mayagüez

Highway system
- Roads in Puerto Rico; List
← PR-60	→ PR-64

Puerto Rico Highway 63 (PR-63) originates at Highway 102 in Mayagüez and terminates 0.6 kilometers later at Puerto Rico Highway 2. It is named the William C. Dunscombe Avenue.

== Major intersections ==
The entire route is located in Mayagüez.

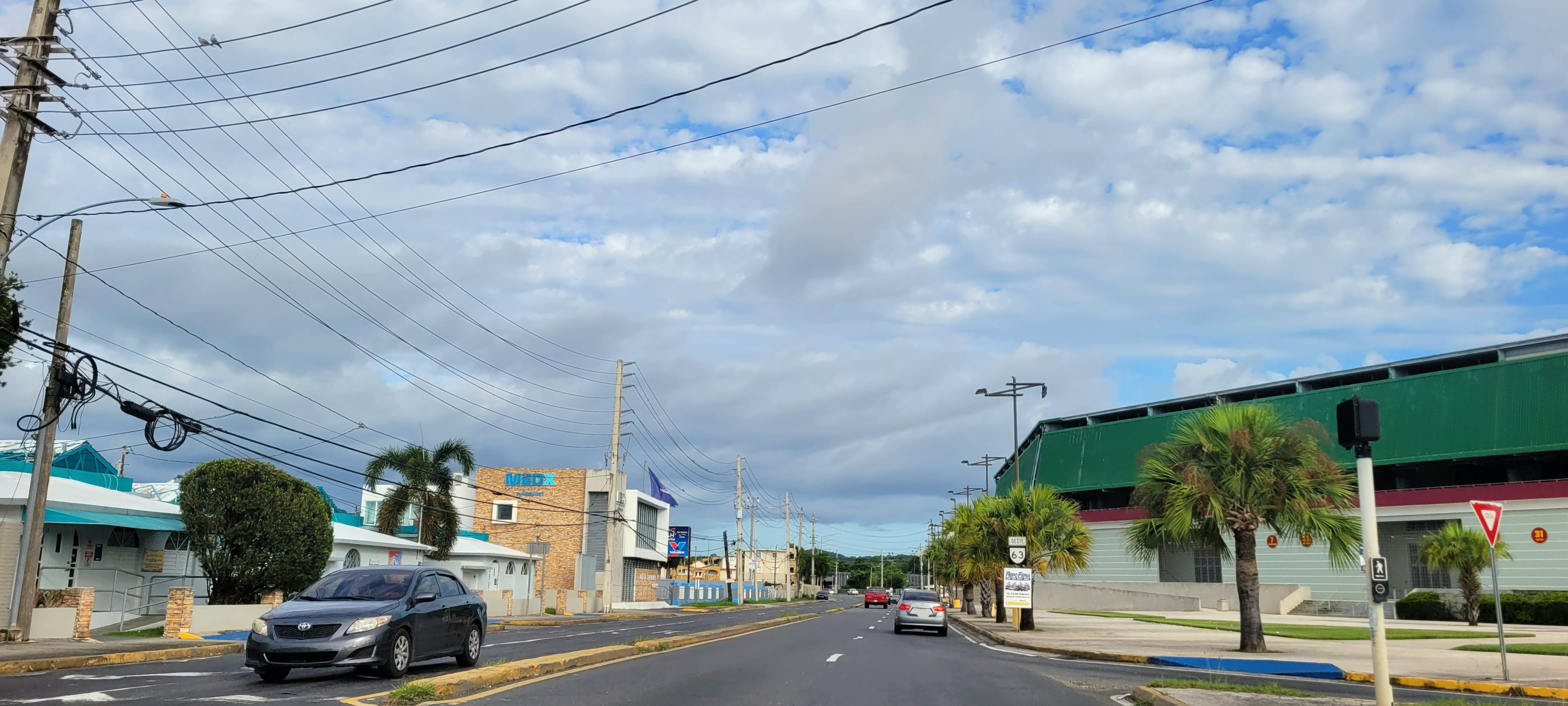
Eastern beginning of PR-63, leaving PR-102 junction

Location	km	mi	Destinations	Notes
Sábalos–Mayagüez barrio-pueblo line	0.0	0.0	PR-102 – Mayagüez, Guanajibo	Western terminus of PR-63
Mayagüez barrio-pueblo	0.3	0.19	PR-Calle E – Mayagüez	
Mayagüez barrio-pueblo	0.4– 0.5	0.25– 0.31	PR-Calle Agustín Stahl / PR-Calle C – Mayagüez	
Mayagüez barrio-pueblo	0.60	0.37	PR-2 (Expreso Eugenio María de Hostos) – Mayagüez, Aguadilla, Hormigueros	Eastern terminus of PR-63
1.000 mi = 1.609 km; 1.000 km = 0.621 mi
