= Calle Concordia =

Highway in Puerto Rico

Highway 3342
- Ruta 3342
- Calle Concordia

Route information
- Maintained by Puerto Rico DTPW
- Length: 1.1 km (0.68 mi)

Major junctions
- South end: PR-102 in Mayagüez barrio-pueblo
- PR-3341 in Mayagüez barrio-pueblo
- North end: PR-64 / PR-102 in Mayagüez barrio-pueblo

Location
- Country: United States
- Territory: Puerto Rico
- Municipalities: Mayagüez

Highway system
- Roads in Puerto Rico; List
← PR-3301	→ PR-3344

Calle Concordia (Concordia Street) is a short but important thoroughfare running north–south through the Mayagüez, Puerto Rico neighborhood of El Seco. The street runs for 0.72 miles and is signed as Puerto Rico Highway 3342 (PR-3342) and begins at the intersection of PR-102 and PR-64 and ends as a dead end at the Yagüez River, just south of Calle San Pablo (San Pablo Street). Calle Concordia also forms the western boundary of the Concordia Public Housing Complex.

== Major intersections ==
The entire route is located in Mayagüez barrio-pueblo, Mayagüez.

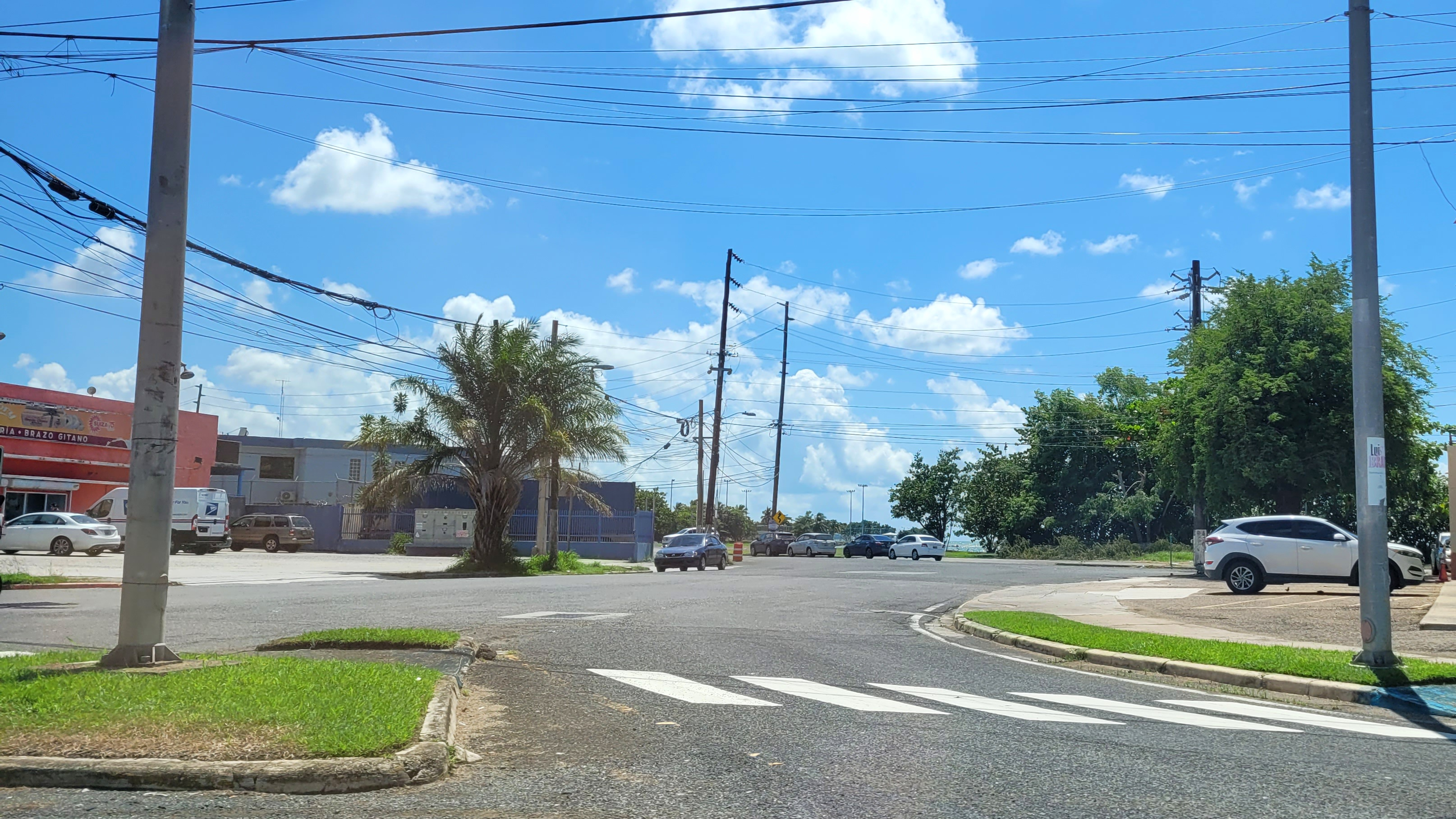
Northern terminus from PR-64

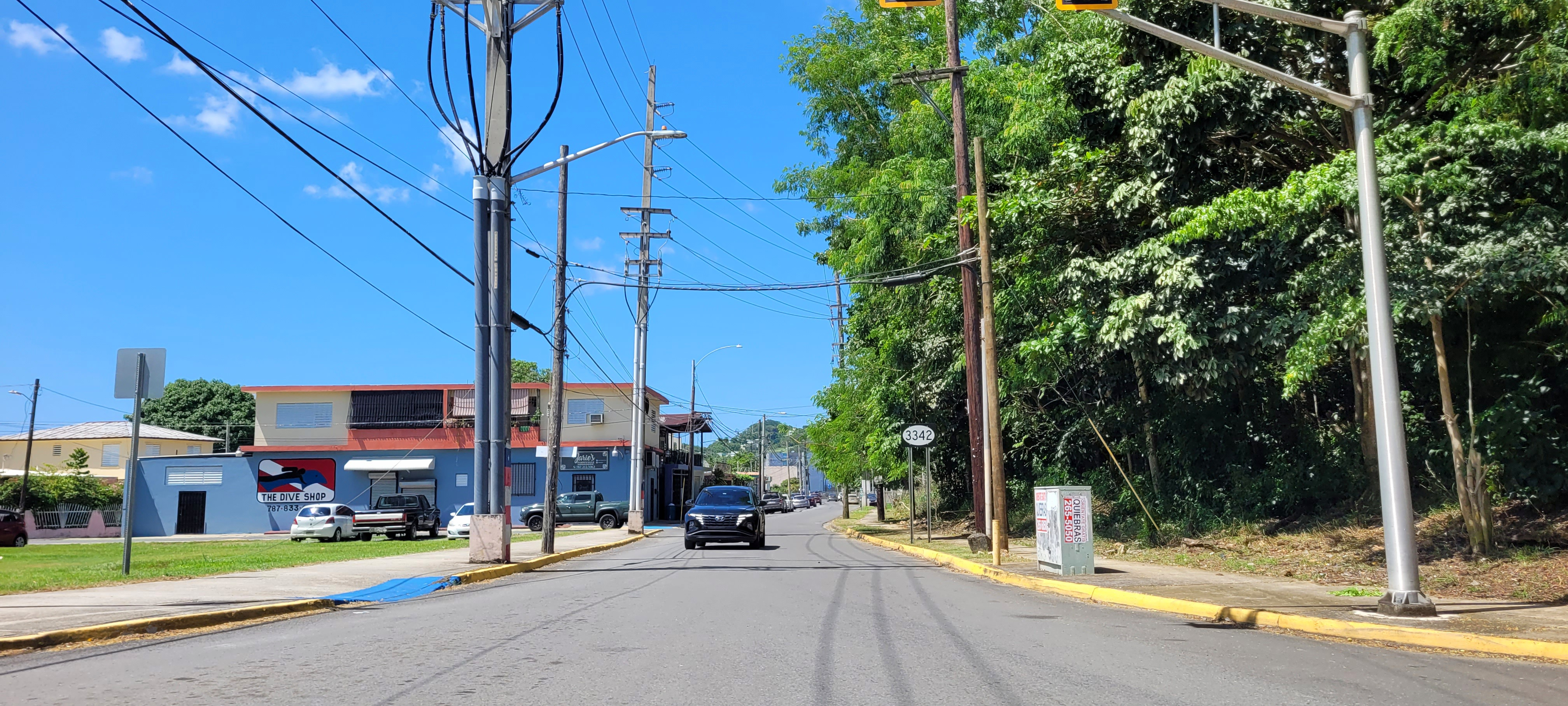
Looking north from PR-102 south

km	mi	Destinations	Notes
1.1	0.68	PR-102 north / PR-Calle San Pablo	Southern terminus of PR-3342; PR-102 is one-way northbound; unsigned
1.0	0.62	PR-102 south	One-way southbound; access to Joyuda; unsigned
0.1	0.062	PR-3341	Southern terminus of PR-3341; access to the Port of Mayagüez
0.0	0.0	PR-64 / PR-102 to PR-2 – Mayagüez, Aguadilla	Northern terminus of PR-3342 and southern terminus of PR-64; PR-2 access is via PR-102 east
1.000 mi = 1.609 km; 1.000 km = 0.621 mi
