= Puerto Rico Highway 166 =

Highway in Puerto Rico

Highway 166
- Ruta 166
- Avenida Jorge Alberto Ramos Comas

Route information
- Maintained by Puerto Rico DTPW
- Length: 2.7 km (1.7 mi)

Major junctions
- West end: PR-102 in Sabana Grande Abajo–Maresúa
- PR-101 in San Germán barrio-pueblo
- East end: PR-122 in Retiro

Location
- Country: United States
- Territory: Puerto Rico
- Municipalities: San Germán

Highway system
- Roads in Puerto Rico; List
← PR-165	→ PR-167

Puerto Rico Highway 166 (PR-166) is a by-pass in San Germán, Puerto Rico. The highway is an avenue which was built for drivers passing through PR-102 could bypass the downtown area of San Germán.

Among its intersections are PR-102 (to downtown San Germán, Cabo Rojo and Sabana Grande), PR-101 (to Lajas) and PR-122 (to PR-2).

== Major intersections ==
The entire route is located in San Germán.

Location	km	mi	Destinations	Notes
Sabana Grande Abajo–Maresúa line	0.0	0.0	PR-102 (Avenida Universidad Interamericana) – San Germán, Cabo Rojo, Mayagüez	Western terminus of PR-166
San Germán barrio-pueblo	1.3– 1.4	0.81– 0.87	PR-101 – San Germán, Lajas	
Retiro	2.7	1.7	PR-122 north (Avenida Ángel René "Yino" Antongiorgi Quiñones) – San Germán	Eastern terminus of PR-166
1.000 mi = 1.609 km; 1.000 km = 0.621 mi

== See also ==
- Jorge Alberto Ramos Comas
