= Puerto Rico Highway 64 =

Highway in Puerto Rico

Highway 64
- Ruta 64
- Avenida Alcalde Benjamín Cole Vázquez

Route information
- Maintained by Puerto Rico DTPW
- Length: 5.5 km (3.4 mi)

Major junctions
- South end: PR-102 / PR-3342 in Mayagüez barrio-pueblo
- PR-3341 in Mayagüez barrio-pueblo; PR-341 in Sabanetas
- North end: PR-2 / PR-342 in Sabanetas

Location
- Country: United States
- Territory: Puerto Rico
- Municipalities: Mayagüez

Highway system
- Roads in Puerto Rico; List
← PR-63	→ PR-65

Puerto Rico Highway 64 (PR-64) is a short divided highway in Mayagüez, Puerto Rico which serves as an alternate route to Puerto Rico Highway 2, beginning at Puerto Rico Highway 102 toward barrio Sabanetas. It meets PR-2 again near Añasco. It is mostly divided. It is also a route to the Mayagüez Port, where a ferry can be taken to Santo Domingo, Dominican Republic.

== Major intersections ==
The entire route is located in Mayagüez.

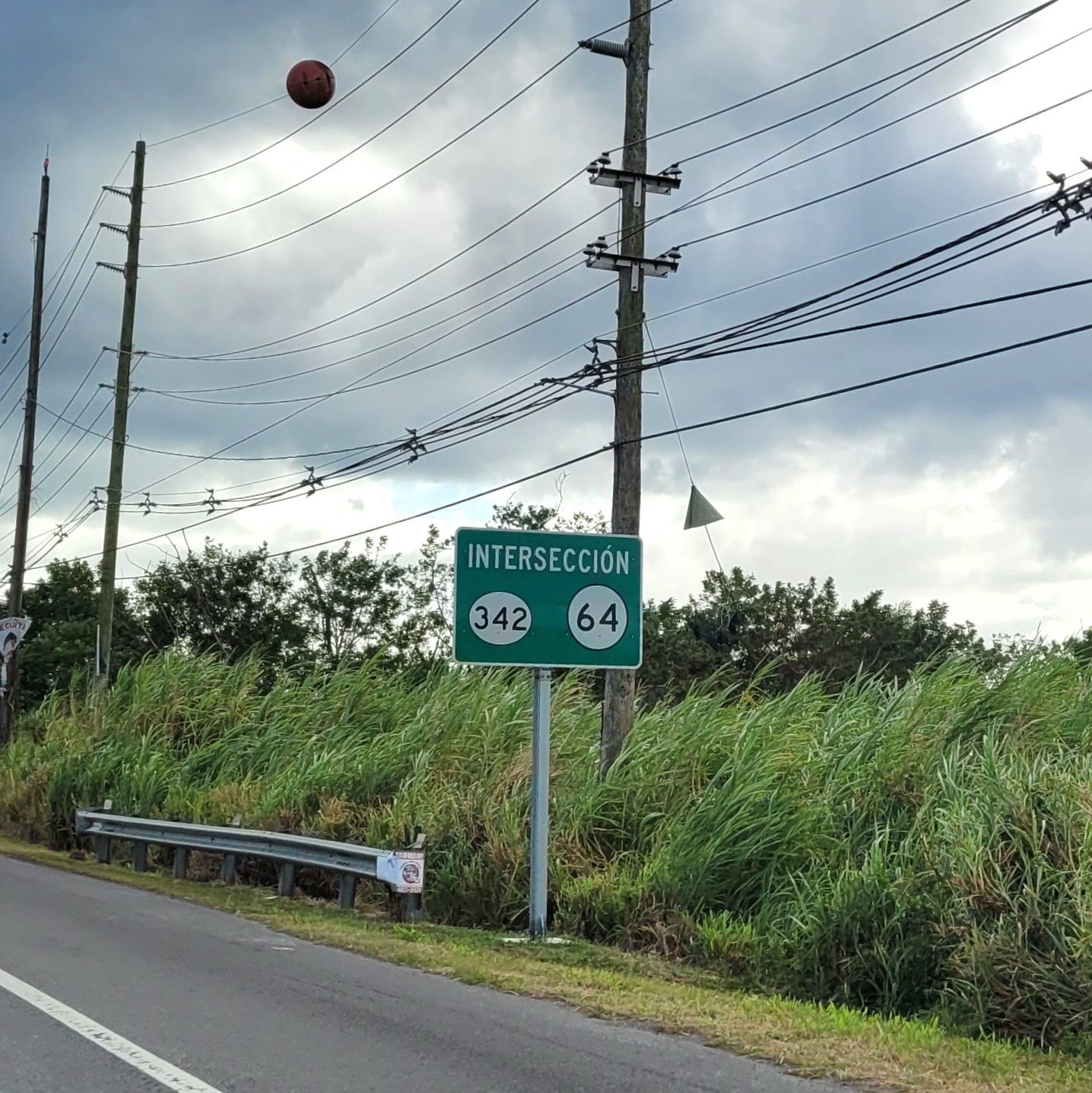
PR-2 south approaching PR-64 and PR-342 intersection in Sabanetas

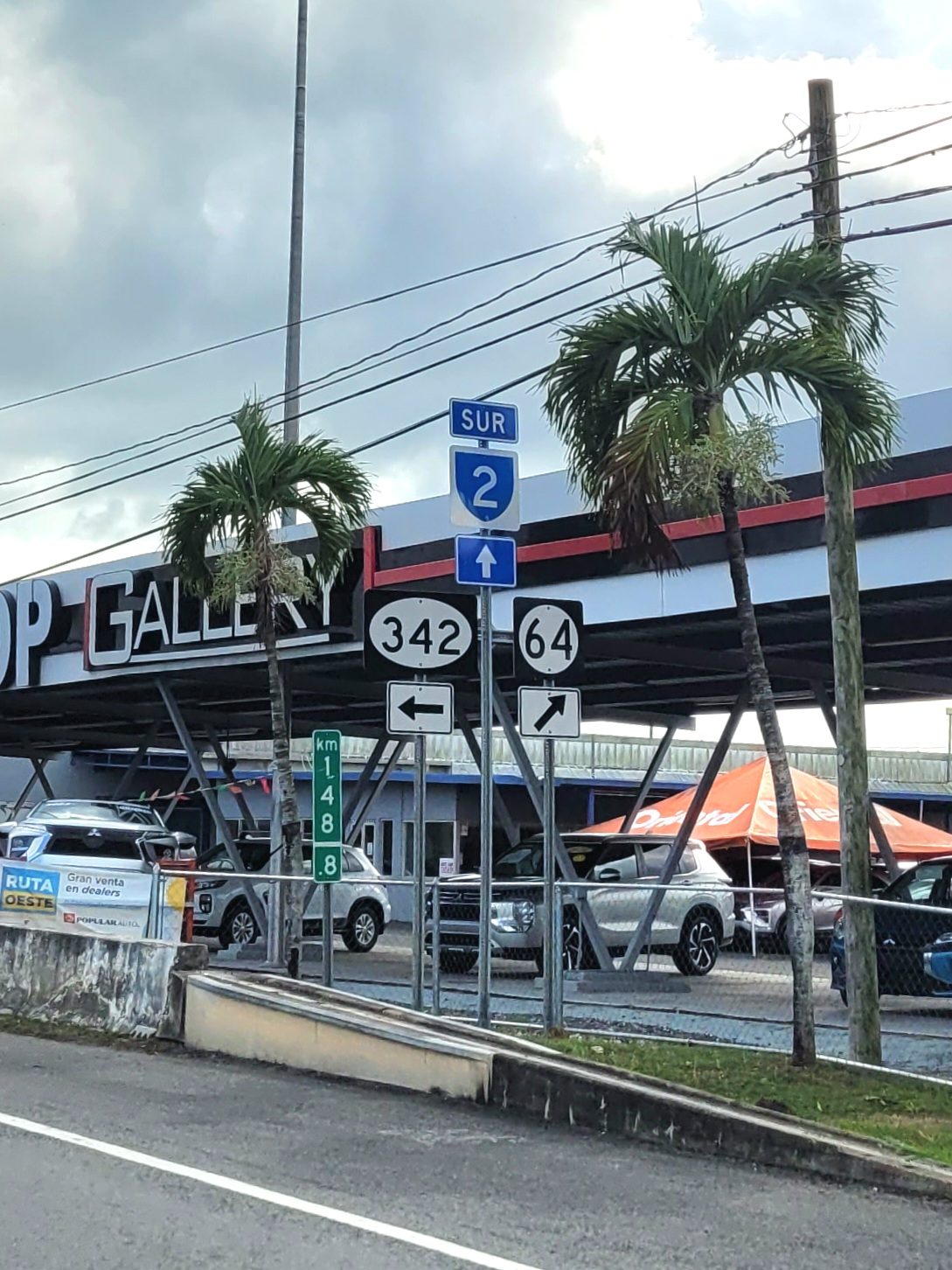
PR-2 south at PR-64 and PR-342 junction in Sabanetas

Location	km	mi	Destinations	Notes
Mayagüez barrio-pueblo	0.0	0.0	PR-102 / PR-3342 (Calle Concordia) to PR-2 (Expreso Miguel A. García Méndez) / PR-3341 – Mayagüez, Aguadilla	Southern terminus of PR-64
Mayagüez barrio-pueblo	0.6	0.37	PR-3341 – Mayagüez	
Sabanetas	4.0	2.5	PR-341 – Boquilla	
Sabanetas	5.5	3.4	PR-2 (Expreso Eugenio María de Hostos) – Mayagüez, Aguadilla	Northern terminus of PR-64 and western terminus of PR-342
Sabanetas	5.5	3.4	PR-342 – Miradero	Continuation beyond PR-2
1.000 mi = 1.609 km; 1.000 km = 0.621 mi

== See also ==
- Benjamín Cole (mayor)
