= Puerto Rico Highway 101 =

Highway in Puerto Rico

Highway 101
- Ruta 101

Route information
- Maintained by Puerto Rico DTPW
- Length: 19.1 km (11.9 mi)

Major junctions
- West end: Calle José de Diego in Boquerón
- PR-307 in Boquerón; PR-100 in Boquerón; PR-301 in Boquerón–Llanos Costa; PR-103 in Llanos Costa–Llanos Tuna–Boquerón; PR-303 in Palmarejo; PR-315 in Lajas barrio-pueblo; PR-116 in Lajas barrio-pueblo–Lajas; PR-321 in Lajas–Ancones; PR-318 in Ancones; PR-166 in San Germán barrio-pueblo
- East end: PR-102 in San Germán barrio-pueblo

Location
- Country: United States
- Territory: Puerto Rico
- Municipalities: Cabo Rojo, Lajas, San Germán

Highway system
- Roads in Puerto Rico; List
← PR-100	→ PR-102
← PR-1116	PR-3101	→ PR-3108

Puerto Rico Highway 101 (PR-101) is a rural road leaving the town of Boquerón, Cabo Rojo and Lajas, to the town of San Germán. Among their intersections are the PR-100, PR-301 (to El Combate), PR-103 PR-116 (to Guánica), PR-166 and PR-102.

== Major intersections ==
Municipality	Location	km	mi	Destinations	Notes
Cabo Rojo	Boquerón	19.1	11.9	PR-Calle José de Diego – Boquerón	Western terminus of PR-101
Cabo Rojo	Boquerón	18.6	11.6	PR-307 (Calle Estación) – Boquerón	
Cabo Rojo	Boquerón	17.7 14.6 (Note: Kilometer markers represent the distance along PR-100 rather than PR-101.)	11.0 9.1	PR-100 north (Avenida Antonio J. "Tony" Fas Alzamora) – Mayagüez	Western terminus of PR-100 concurrency; seagull intersection
Cabo Rojo	Boquerón	15.0 17.6	9.3 10.9	PR-100 south (Avenida Antonio J. "Tony" Fas Alzamora) – Combate	Eastern terminus of PR-100 concurrency; seagull intersection
Cabo Rojo	Boquerón–Llanos Costa line	16.7	10.4	PR-301 (Carretera Antonio J. "Tony" Fas Alzamora) – Combate	
Cabo Rojo	Llanos Costa–Llanos Tuna– Boquerón tripoint	15.6	9.7	PR-103 – Cabo Rojo	
Lajas	Llanos	12.4	7.7	PR-306 – Llanos	
Lajas	Palmarejo	8.9	5.5	PR-303 – Parguera	
Lajas	Palmarejo	7.9	4.9	PR-306 – Palmarejo	
Lajas	Candelaria–Palmarejo line	7.7– 7.6	4.8– 4.7	PR-392 – Candelaria	
Lajas	Candelaria–Palmarejo line	7.1	4.4	PR-316 – Candelaria	
Lajas	Lajas barrio-pueblo	5.3	3.3	PR-315 south (Calle 65 de Infantería) – Guánica	
Lajas	Lajas barrio-pueblo–Lajas line	5.0– 4.9	3.1– 3.0	PR-116 south (Avenida Manuel "Pito" Pagán Ramírez) – Guánica	
San Germán–Lajas municipal line	Ancones–Lajas line	3.5	2.2	PR-3101 – Lajas	
San Germán–Lajas municipal line	Ancones–Lajas line	3.4– 3.3	2.1– 2.1	PR-321 – Santa Rosa	
San Germán	Ancones	2.7	1.7	PR-318 – Cabo Rojo, Hormigueros	
San Germán	Ancones	2.5	1.6	PR-320 – Ancones	
San Germán	San Germán barrio-pueblo	0.4	0.25	PR-320 – Ancones	
San Germán	San Germán barrio-pueblo	0.2	0.12	PR-166 (Avenida Jorge Alberto Ramos Comas) – Cabo Rojo, Sabana Grande	
San Germán	San Germán barrio-pueblo	0.0	0.0	PR-102 (Avenida Universidad Interamericana) – Cabo Rojo, Sabana Grande	Eastern terminus of PR-101
1.000 mi = 1.609 km; 1.000 km = 0.621 mi: Concurrency terminus

== Related route ==
Highway 3101
- Location: Lajas – San Germán
- Length: 1.5 km (0.93 mi)

Puerto Rico Highway 3101 (PR-3101) is a road parallel to PR-101 between the municipalities of Lajas and San Germán. It is known as Calle San Blas in downtown Lajas.

Municipality	Location	km	mi	Destinations	Notes
Lajas	Lajas	1.5	0.93	PR-Calle San Blas – Lajas	Southern terminus of PR-3101
Lajas–San Germán municipal line	Lajas–Ancones line	0.0	0.0	PR-101 – San Germán	Northern terminus of PR-3101
1.000 mi = 1.609 km; 1.000 km = 0.621 mi
