= Miradero, Cabo Rojo, Puerto Rico =

Barrio of Puerto Rico

Miradero
- Barrio
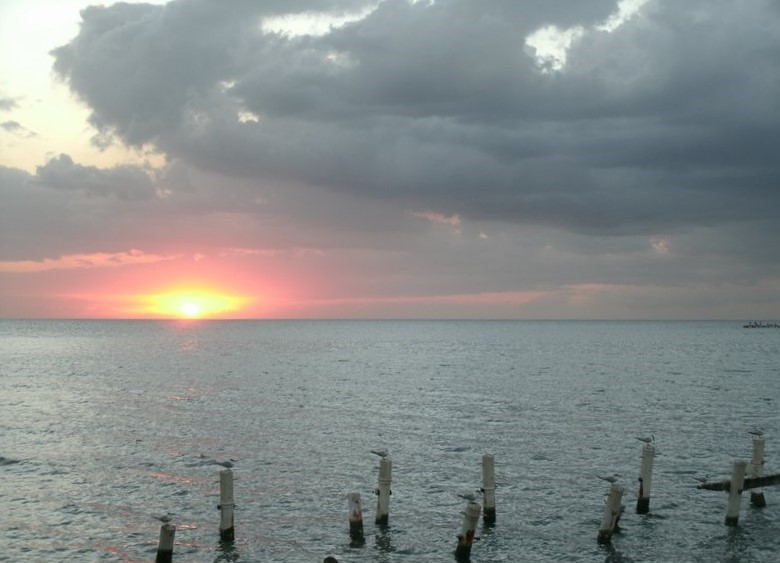
- Joyuda in Miradero

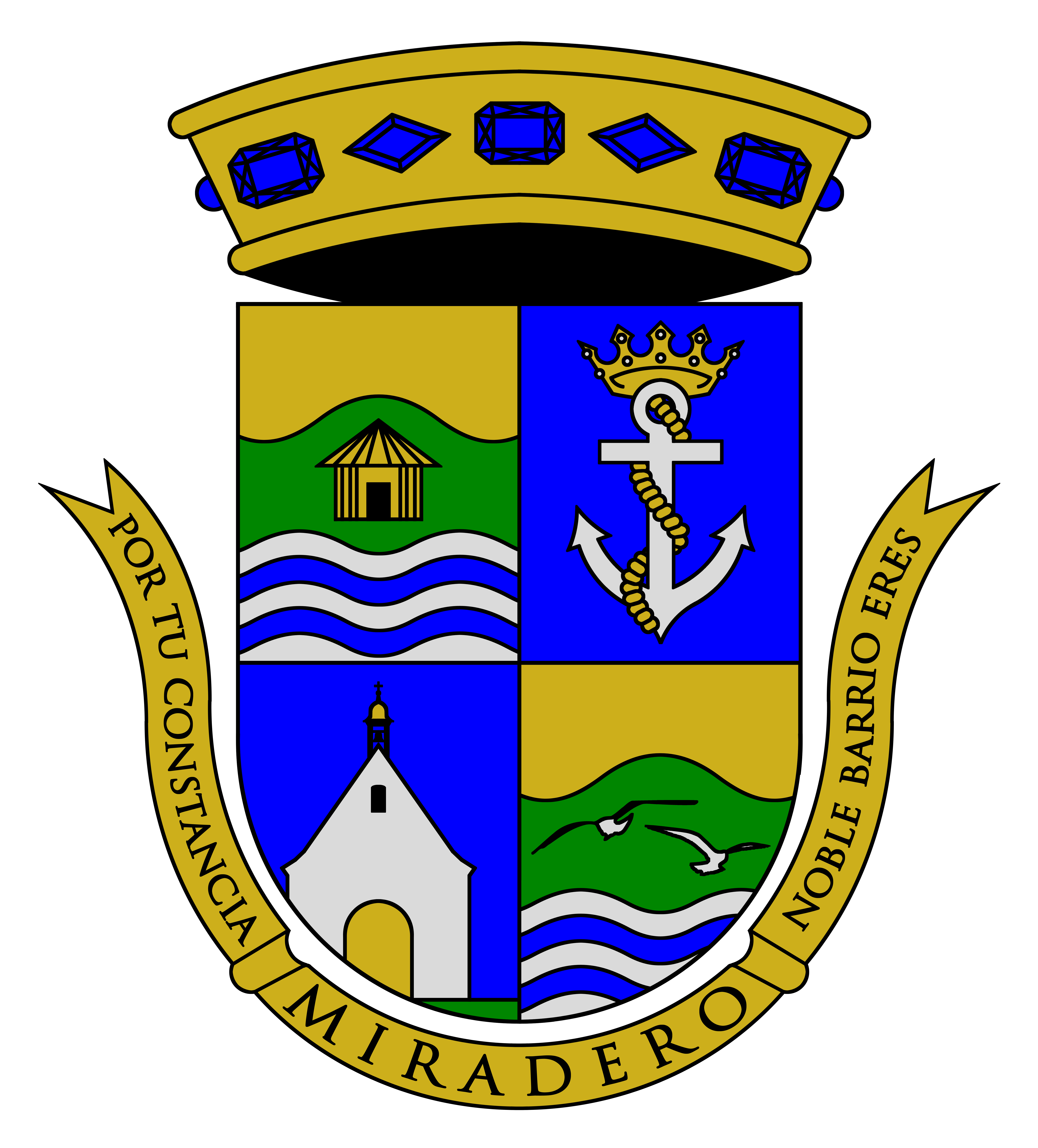
- Seal

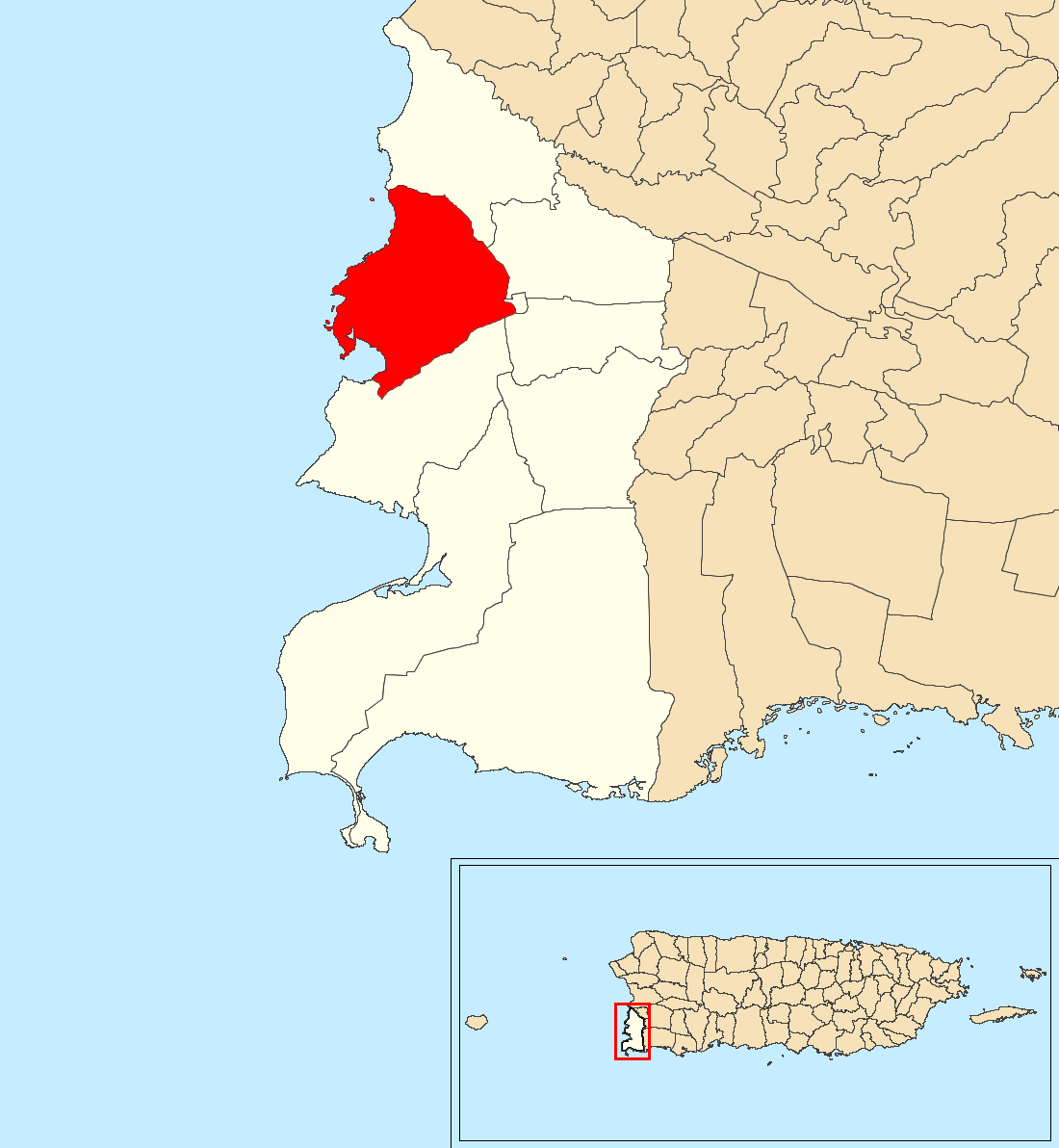
- Location of Miradero within the municipality of Cabo Rojo shown in red

- Location of Puerto Rico
- Coordinates: 18°05′19″N 67°10′38″W
- Commonwealth: Puerto Rico
- Municipality: Cabo Rojo

Area
  - Total: 9.66 sq mi (25.0 km^{2})
  - Land: 7.70 sq mi (19.9 km^{2})
  - Water: 1.96 sq mi (5.1 km^{2})
- Elevation: 49 ft (15 m)

Population (2010)
  - Total: 15,521
  - Density: 2,013.1/sq mi (777.3/km^{2})
- Source: 2010 Census
- Time zone: UTC−4 (AST)
- ZIP code: 00623

Miradero is a barrio in the municipality of Cabo Rojo, Puerto Rico. Its population in 2010 was 15,521. Joyuda, a small fishing village on Cabo Rojos' gastronomic route, is in Miradero.

== Features ==
The public square Plaza del Pescador in Miradero is the venue for the annual Festival del pescao (the festival of the fish).

Joyuda, a fishing village in Miradero is known for its many seafood restaurants along Puerto Rico Highway 102, a coastal road. Joyuda was one of the most impacted areas of Cabo Rojo, when Hurricane María struck Puerto Rico on September 20, 2017.

The Ana G. Méndez University has a campus in Miradero.

== History ==
Miradero was in Spain's gazetteers until Puerto Rico was ceded by Spain in the aftermath of the Spanish–American War under the terms of the Treaty of Paris of 1898 and became an unincorporated territory of the United States. In 1899, the United States Department of War conducted a census of Puerto Rico finding that the population of Miradero barrio was 2,011.

Historical population
Census	Pop.	Note	%±
1900	2,011		—
1910	2,093		4.1%
1920	2,257		7.8%
1930	2,599		15.2%
1940	2,843		9.4%
1950	4,156		46.2%
1960	3,766		−9.4%
1970	0		−100.0%
1980	8,799		—
1990	10,757		22.3%
2000	14,358		33.5%
2010	15,521		8.1%
U.S. Decennial Census; 1899 (shown as 1900) 1910-1930; 1930-1950 1980-2000 2010

== Gallery ==
Places in Miradero:

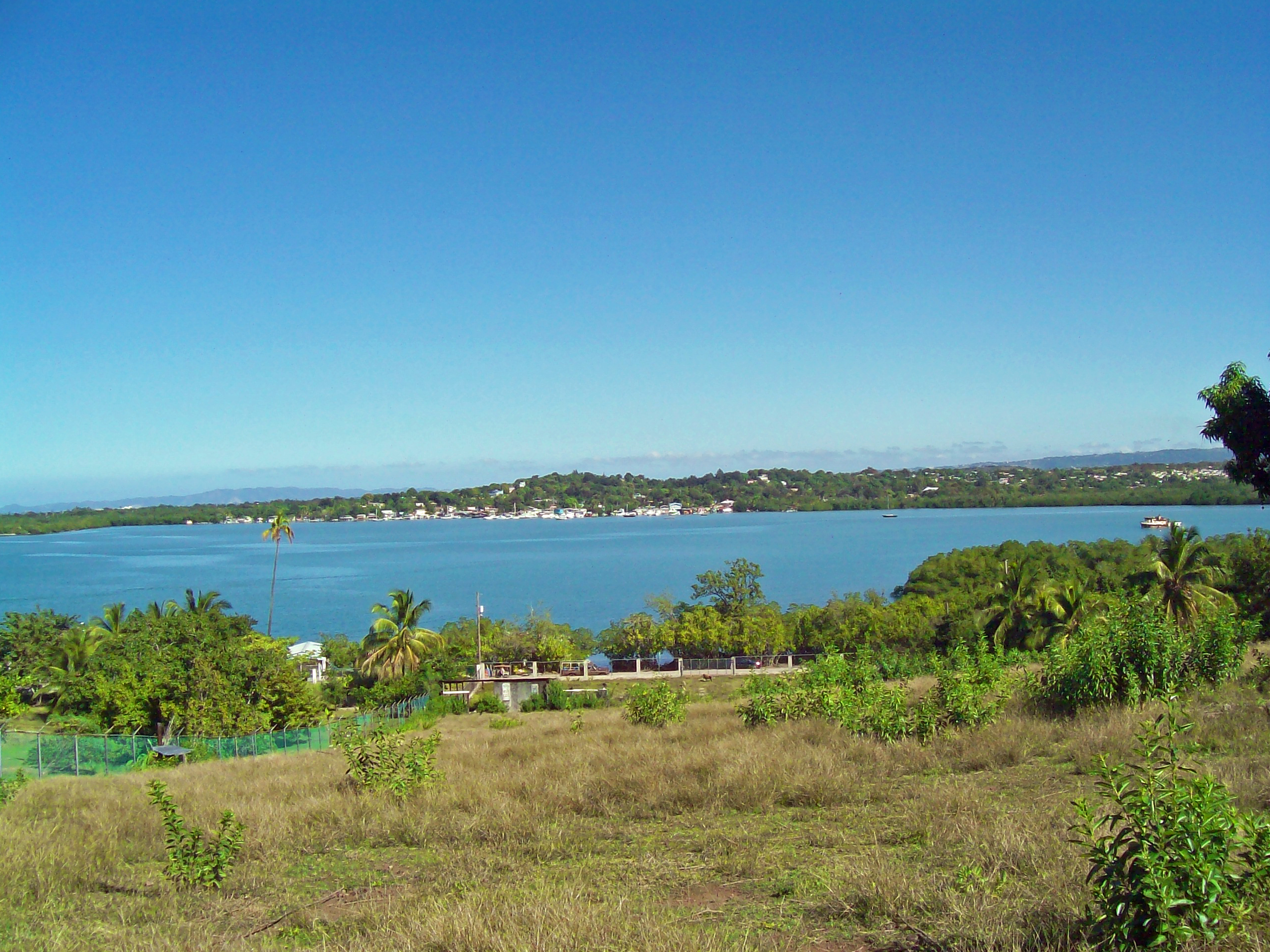
Puerto Real Bay in Miradero

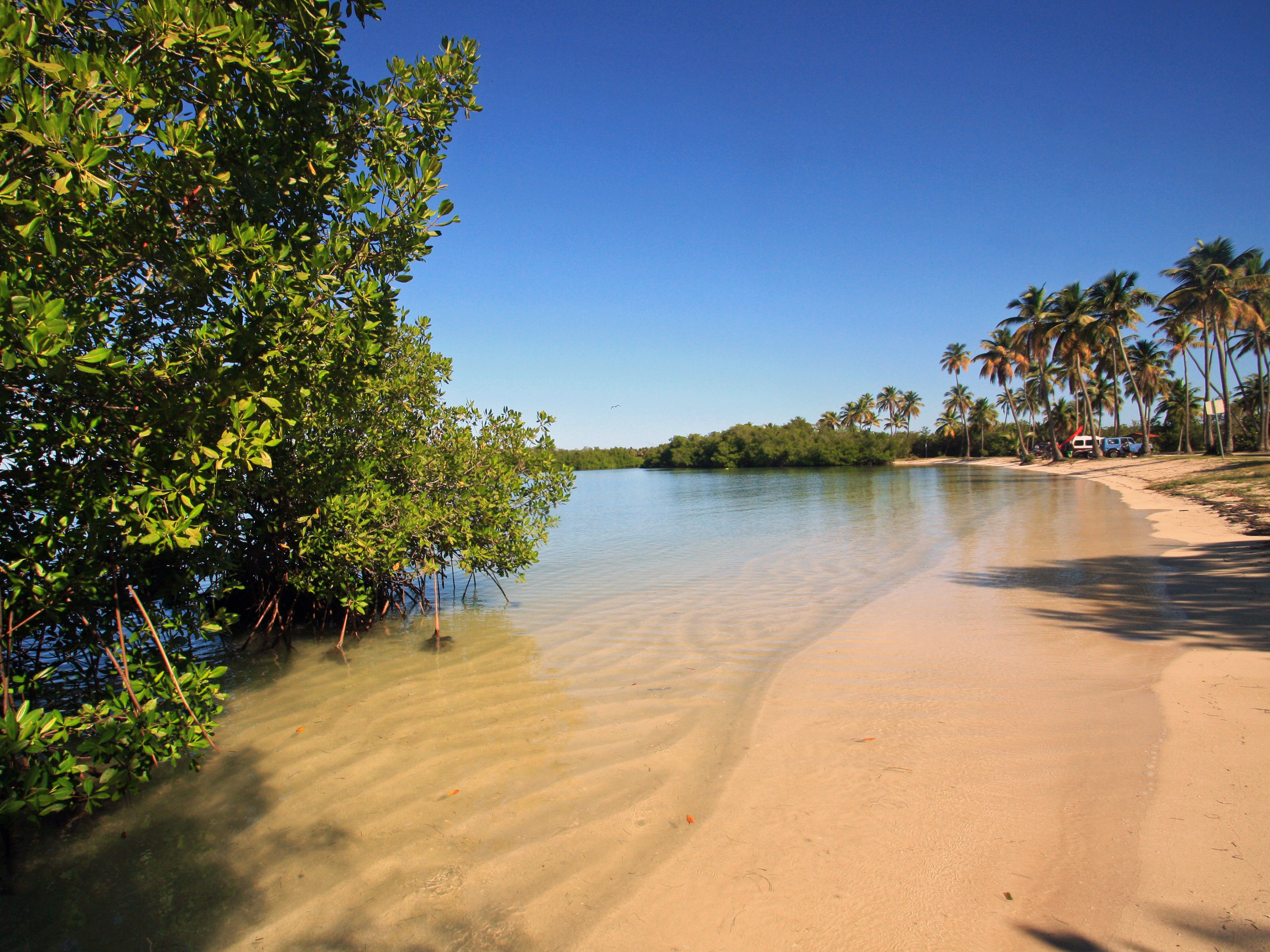
La Playita in Puerto Real

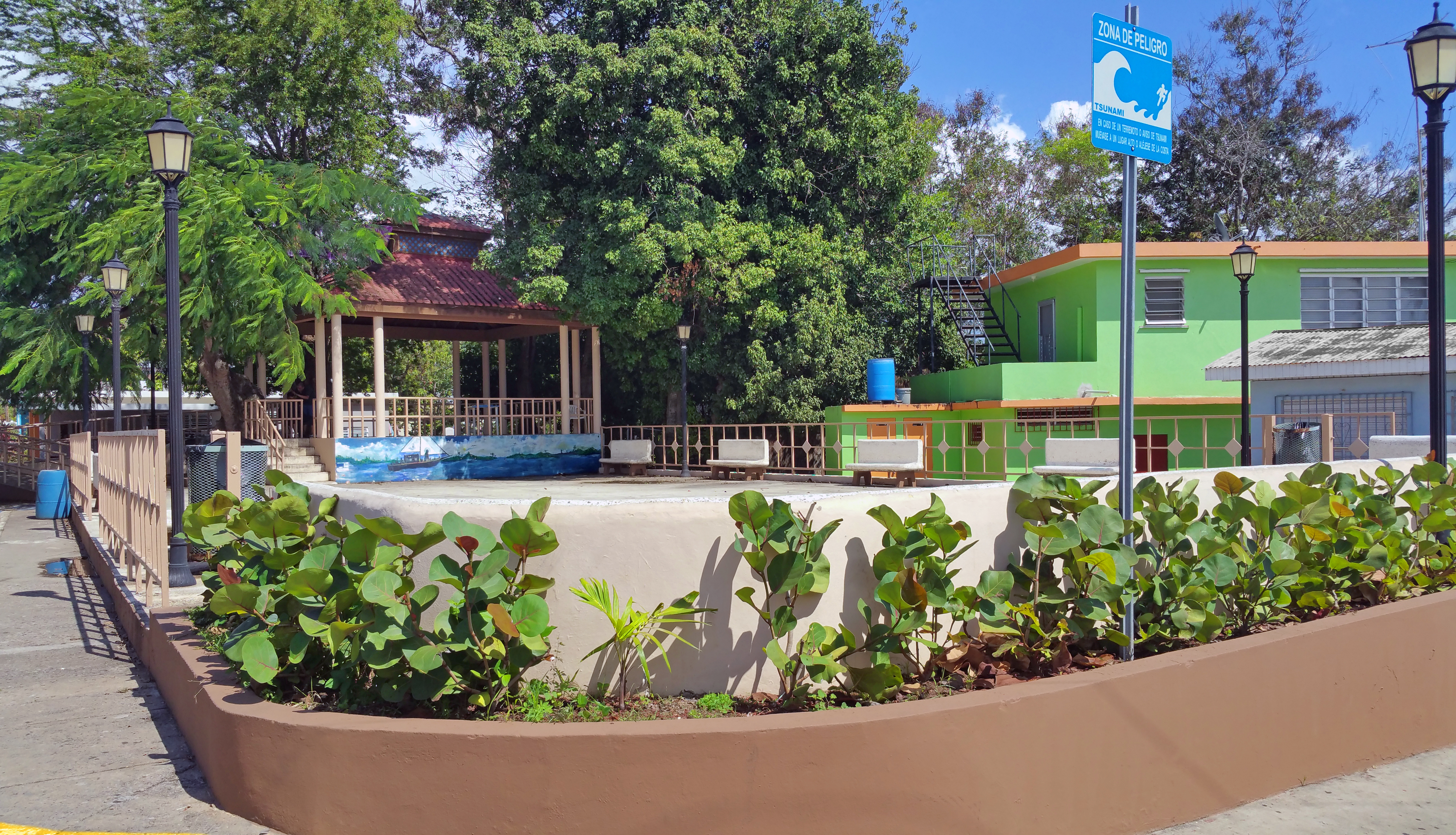
Plaza del Pescador

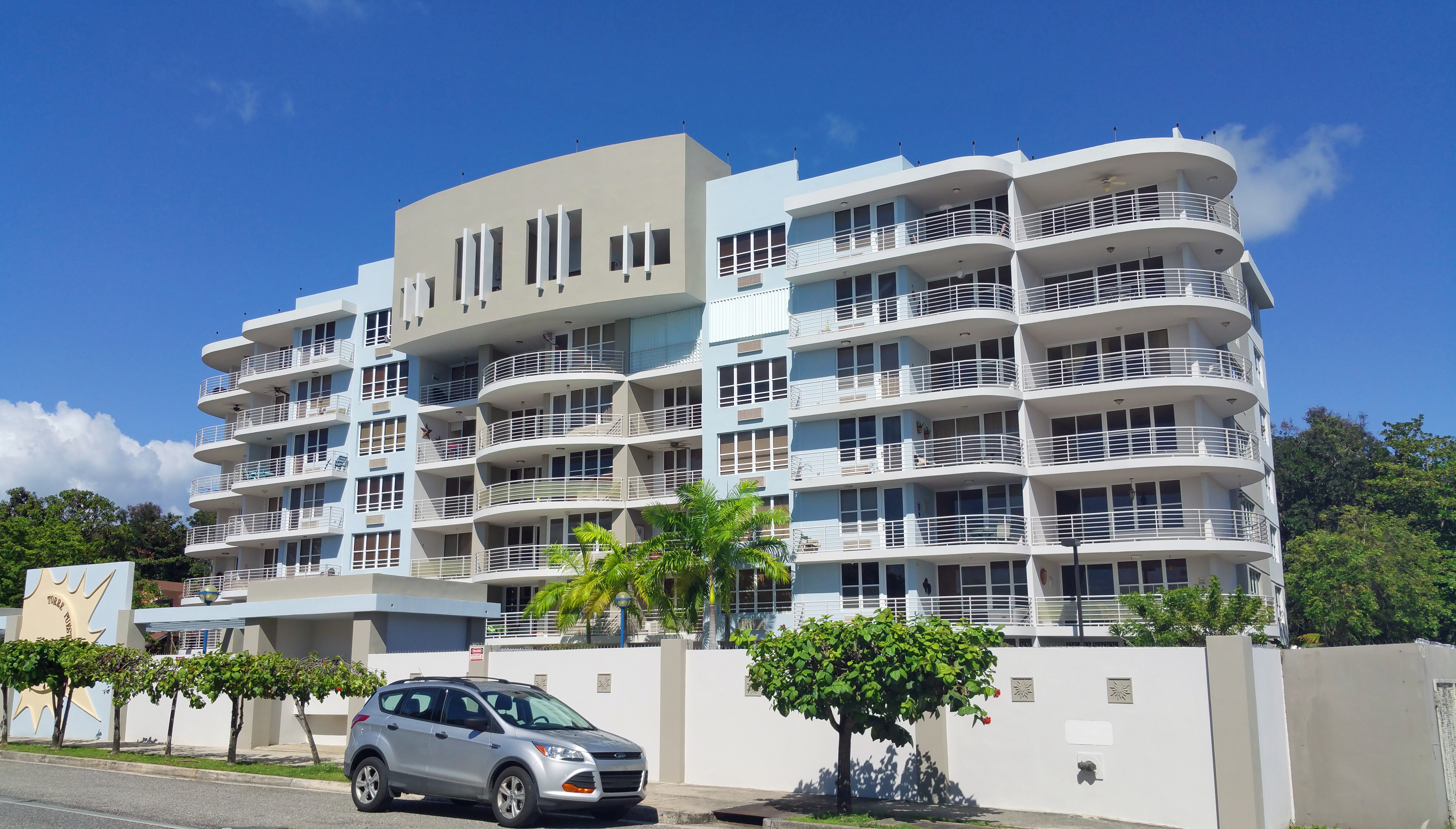
Building in Joyuda

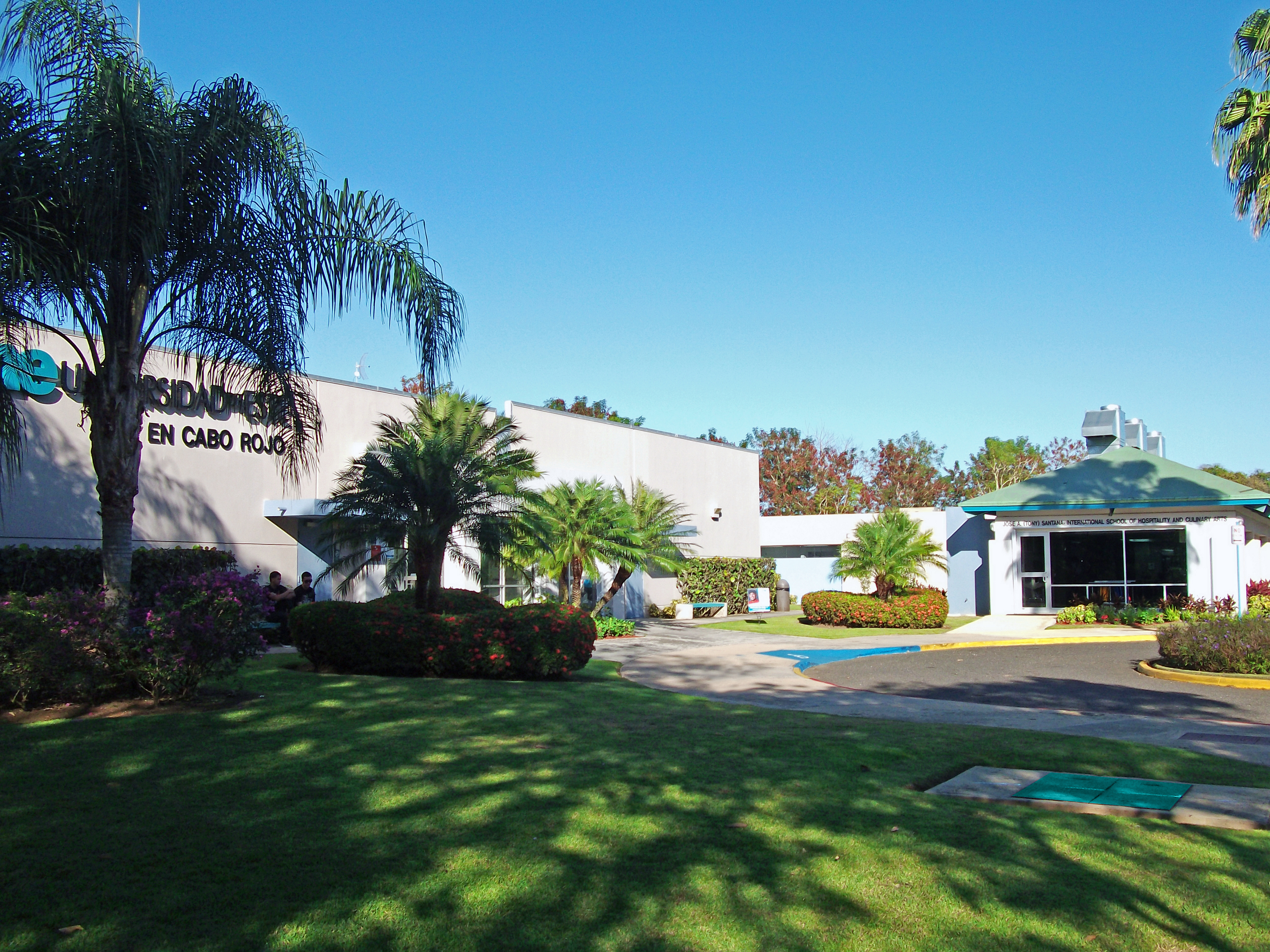
The Ana G. Méndez University, Cabo Rojo campus

== See also ==
- List of communities in Puerto Rico
