= Minillas, San Germán, Puerto Rico =

Barrio of Puerto Rico

Minillas
- Barrio
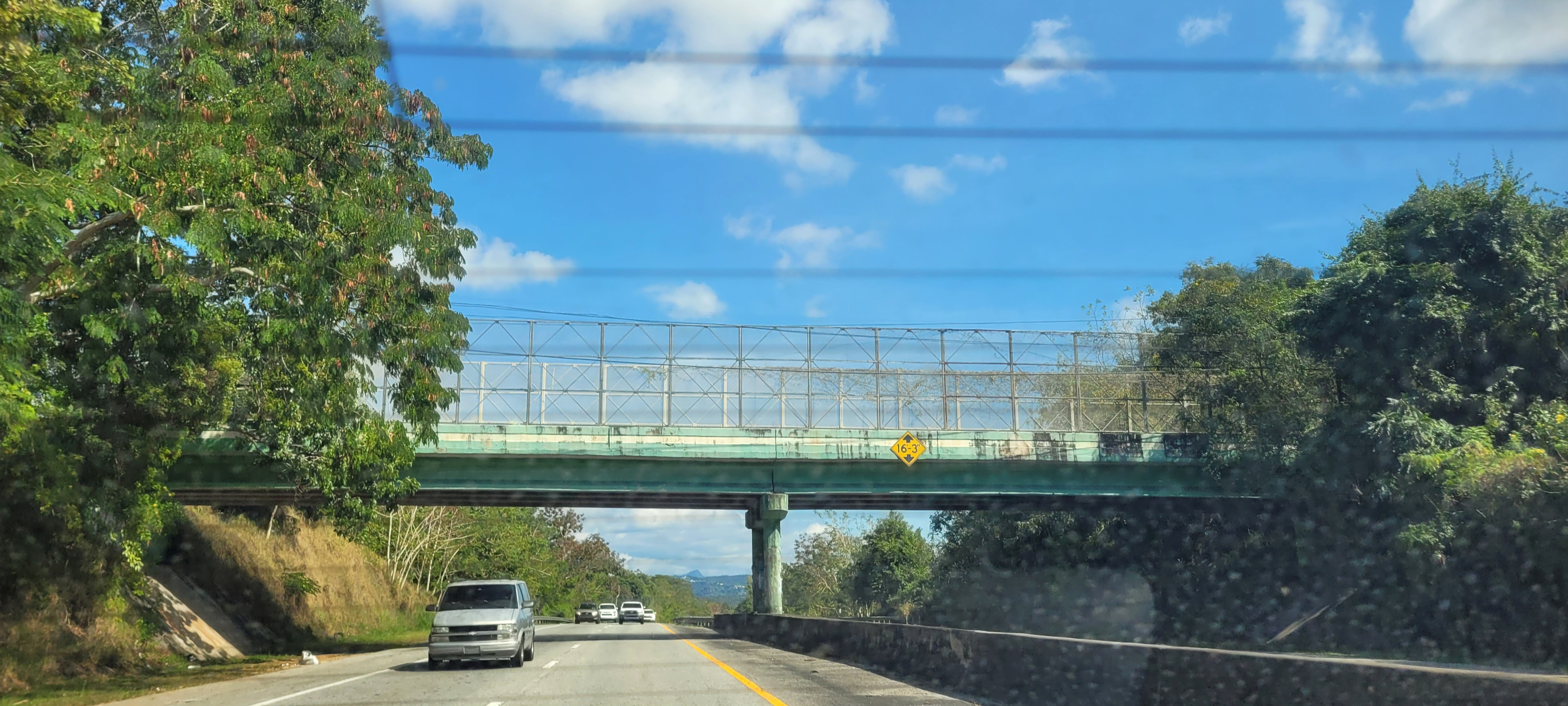
- Puerto Rico Highway 2 in Minillas

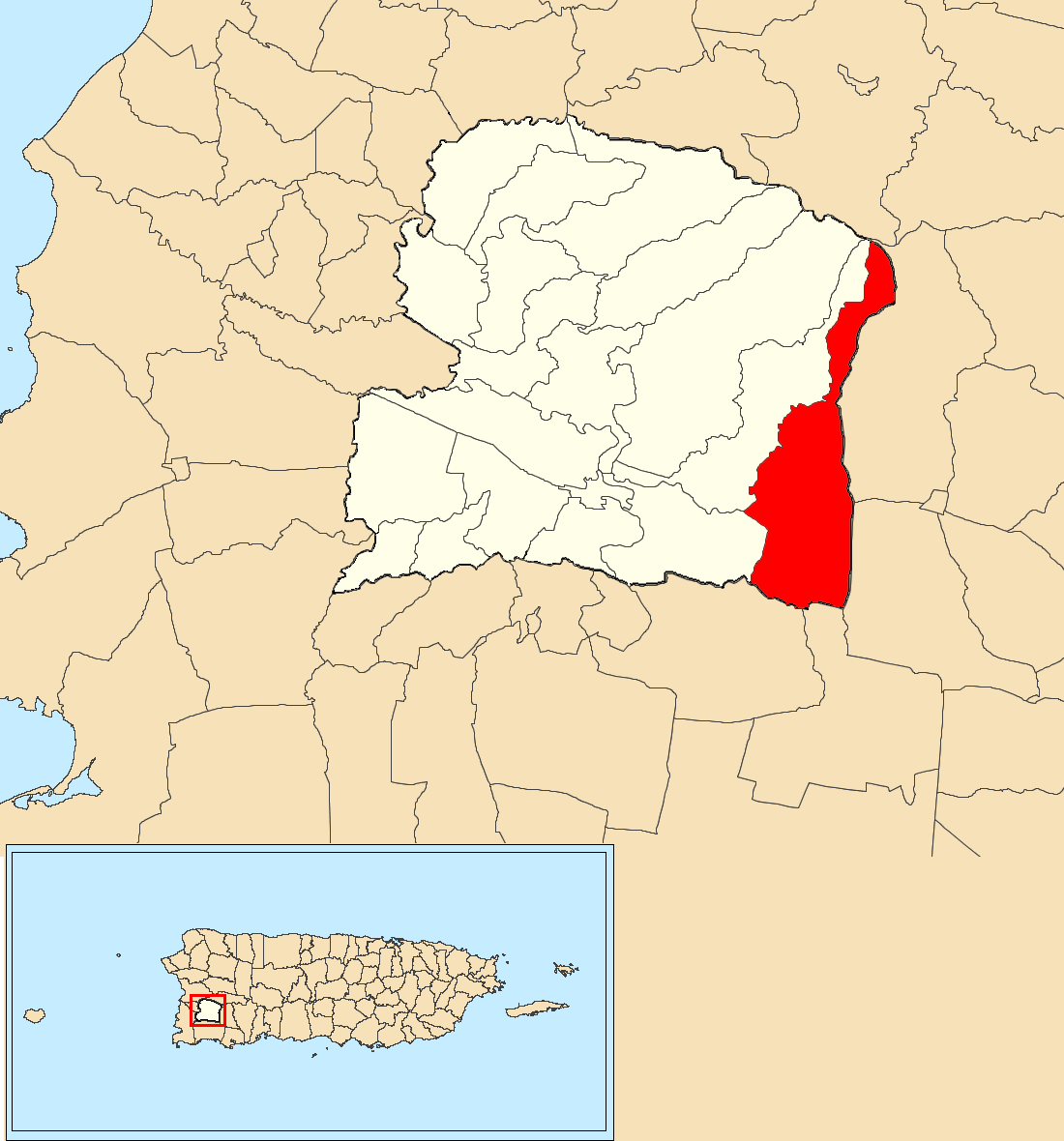
- Location of Minillas within the municipality of San Germán shown in red

- Location of Puerto Rico
- Coordinates: 18°05′14″N 66°59′19″W
- Commonwealth: Puerto Rico
- Municipality: San Germán

Area
  - Total: 5.74 sq mi (14.9 km^{2})
  - Land: 5.74 sq mi (14.9 km^{2})
  - Water: 0 sq mi (0 km^{2})
- Elevation: 341 ft (104 m)

Population (2010)
  - Total: 3,377
  - Density: 588.3/sq mi (227.1/km^{2})
- Source: 2010 Census
- Time zone: UTC−4 (AST)

Minillas is a barrio in the municipality of San Germán, Puerto Rico. Its population in 2010 was 3,377.

== History ==
Minillas was in Spain's gazetteers until Puerto Rico was ceded by Spain in the aftermath of the Spanish–American War under the terms of the Treaty of Paris of 1898 and became an unincorporated territory of the United States. In 1899, the United States Department of War conducted a census of Puerto Rico finding that the population of Minillas barrio was 1,657.

Historical population
Census	Pop.	Note	%±
1900	1,657		—
1910	2,013		21.5%
1920	2,183		8.4%
1930	1,977		−9.4%
1940	2,160		9.3%
1950	2,315		7.2%
1960	2,466		6.5%
1970	2,408		−2.4%
1980	2,727		13.2%
1990	2,931		7.5%
2000	3,484		18.9%
2010	3,377		−3.1%
U.S. Decennial Census; 1899 (shown as 1900) 1910-1930; 1930-1950 1980-2000 2010

== See also ==
- List of communities in Puerto Rico
