= Guamá, San Germán, Puerto Rico =

Barrio of Puerto Rico

Guamá
- Barrio
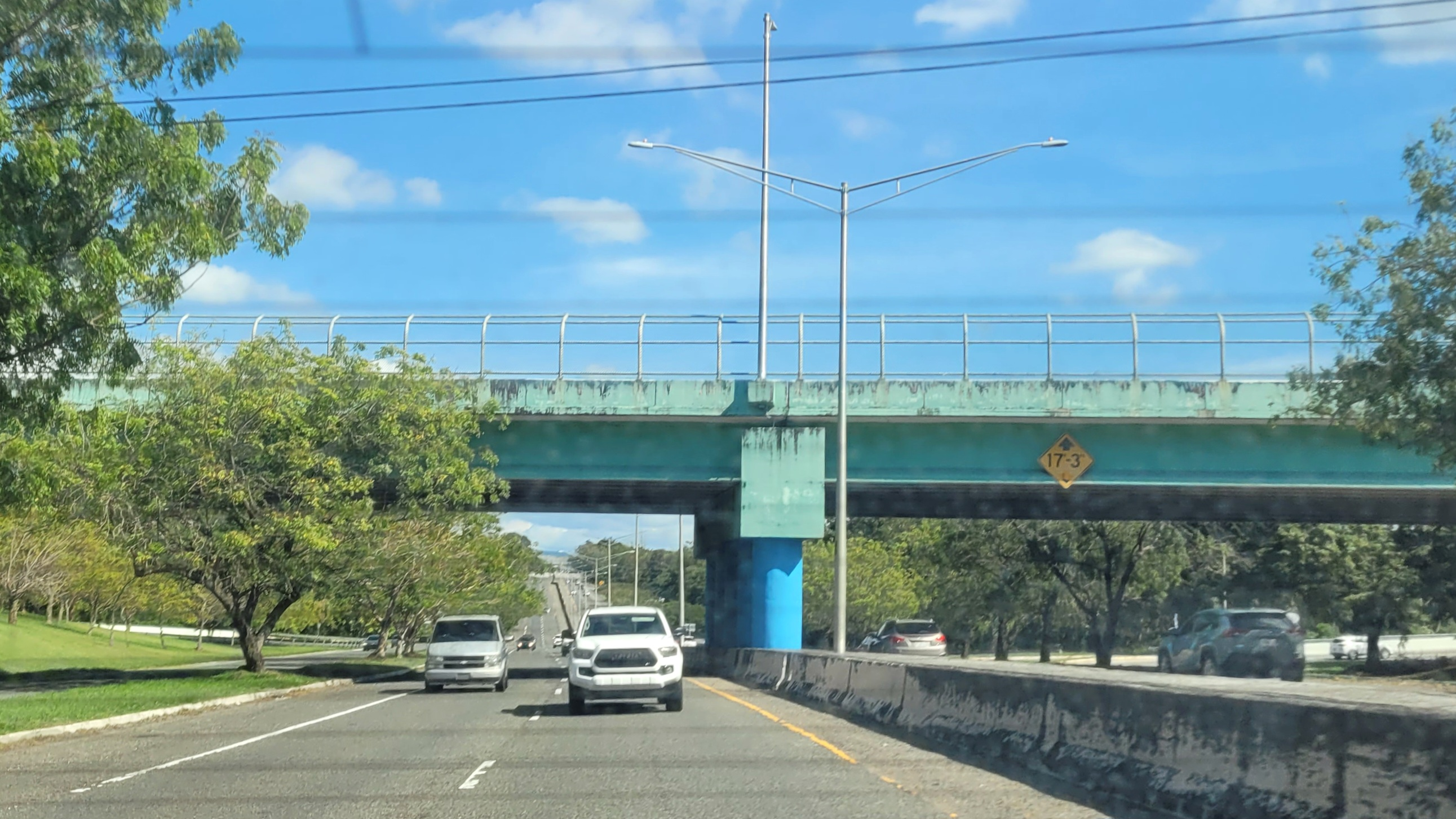
- Puerto Rico Highway 2 in Guamá

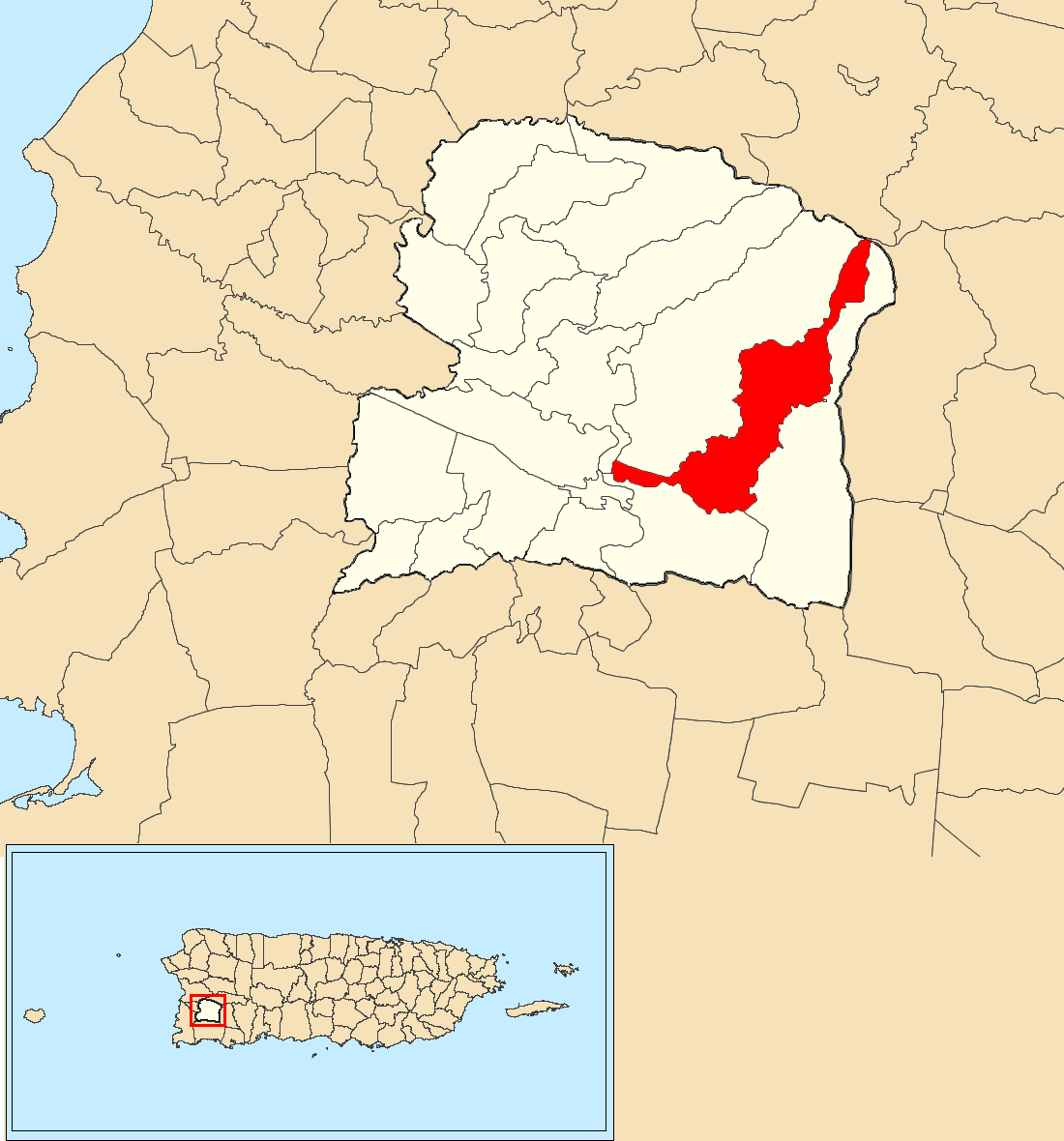
- Location of Guamá within the municipality of San Germán shown in red

- Location of Puerto Rico
- Coordinates: 18°06′07″N 67°00′12″W
- Commonwealth: Puerto Rico
- Municipality: San Germán

Area
  - Total: 4.07 sq mi (10.5 km^{2})
  - Land: 4.07 sq mi (10.5 km^{2})
  - Water: 0 sq mi (0 km^{2})
- Elevation: 486 ft (148 m)

Population (2010)
  - Total: 2,126
  - Density: 522.4/sq mi (201.7/km^{2})
- Source: 2010 Census
- Time zone: UTC−4 (AST)

Guamá is a barrio in the municipality of San Germán, Puerto Rico. Its population in 2010 was 2,126.

== History ==
Guamá was in Spain's gazetteers until Puerto Rico was ceded by Spain in the aftermath of the Spanish–American War under the terms of the Treaty of Paris of 1898 and became an unincorporated territory of the United States. In 1899, the United States Department of War conducted a census of Puerto Rico finding that the population of Guamá barrio was 1,188.

Historical population
Census	Pop.	Note	%±
1900	1,188		—
1910	1,203		1.3%
1920	1,205		0.2%
1930	1,234		2.4%
1940	1,317		6.7%
1950	880		−33.2%
1960	793		−9.9%
1970	0		−100.0%
1980	1,315		—
1990	1,971		49.9%
2000	2,099		6.5%
2010	2,126		1.3%
U.S. Decennial Census; 1899 (shown as 1900) 1910-1930; 1930-1950 1980-2000 2010

== See also ==
- List of communities in Puerto Rico
