= Sábalos, Mayagüez, Puerto Rico =

Barrio of Puerto Rico

Sábalos
- Barrio
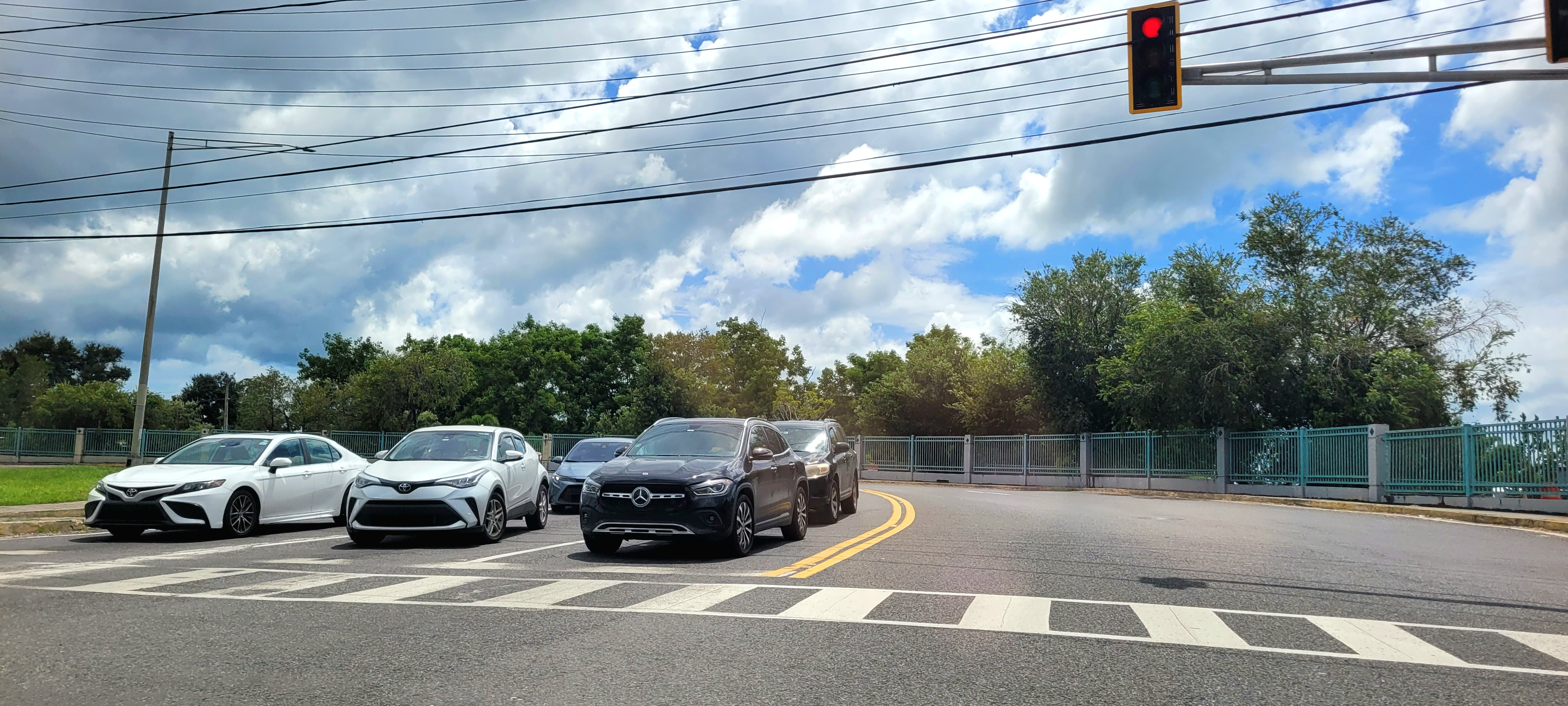
- Puerto Rico Highway 114 in Sábalos

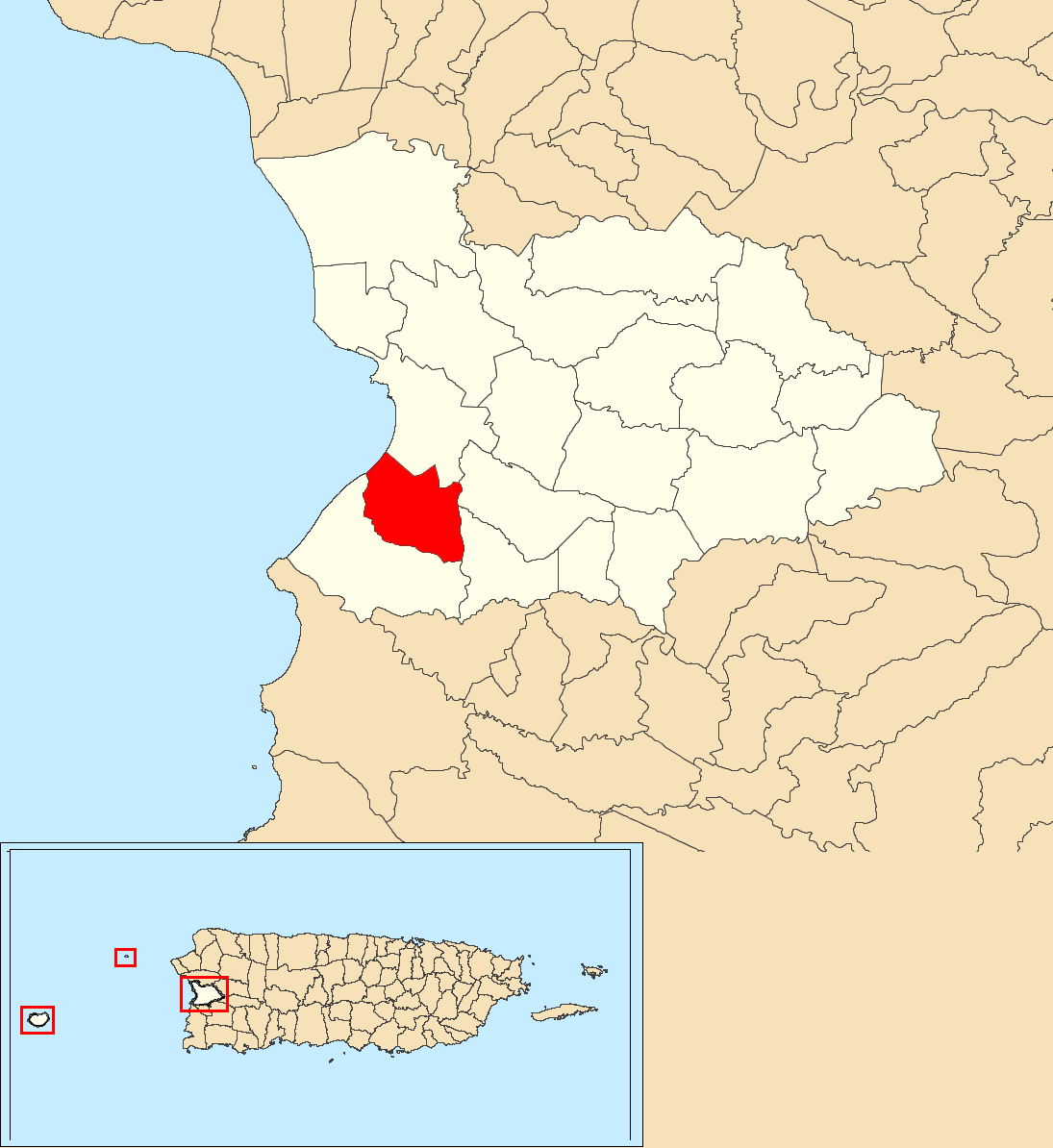
- Location of Sábalos within the municipality of Mayagüez shown in red

- Location of Puerto Rico
- Coordinates: 18°10′47″N 67°08′59″W
- Commonwealth: Puerto Rico
- Municipality: Mayagüez

Area
  - Total: 2.11 sq mi (5.5 km^{2})
  - Land: 1.99 sq mi (5.2 km^{2})
  - Water: 0.12 sq mi (0.31 km^{2})
- Elevation: 36 ft (11 m)

Population (2010)
  - Total: 10,741
  - Density: 5,397.5/sq mi (2,084.0/km^{2})
- Source: 2010 Census
- Time zone: UTC−4 (AST)

Sábalos is a barrio in the municipality of Mayagüez, Puerto Rico. Its population in 2010 was 10,741.

== History ==
Sábalos was in Spain's gazetteers until Puerto Rico was ceded by Spain in the aftermath of the Spanish–American War under the terms of the Treaty of Paris of 1898 and became an unincorporated territory of the United States. In 1899, the United States Department of War conducted a census of Puerto Rico finding that the population of Sábalos barrio was 2,365.

Sábalos is a rural, coastal town named after the Atlantic tarpon, (Spanish: Sábalo Real), which were fished by Christopher Columbus at this location in and around November 19, 1493.

Historical population
Census	Pop.	Note	%±
1900	2,365		—
1910	3,400		43.8%
1920	4,358		28.2%
1930	3,536		−18.9%
1940	4,574		29.4%
1950	3,578		−21.8%
1960	4,608		28.8%
1970	8,179		77.5%
1980	9,787		19.7%
1990	11,683		19.4%
2000	10,271		−12.1%
2010	10,741		4.6%
U.S. Decennial Census; 1899 (shown as 1900) 1910-1930; 1930-1950 1980-2000 2010

== See also ==
- List of communities in Puerto Rico
