= Sabana Grande Abajo =

Barrio in San Germán, Puerto Rico

- Barrio
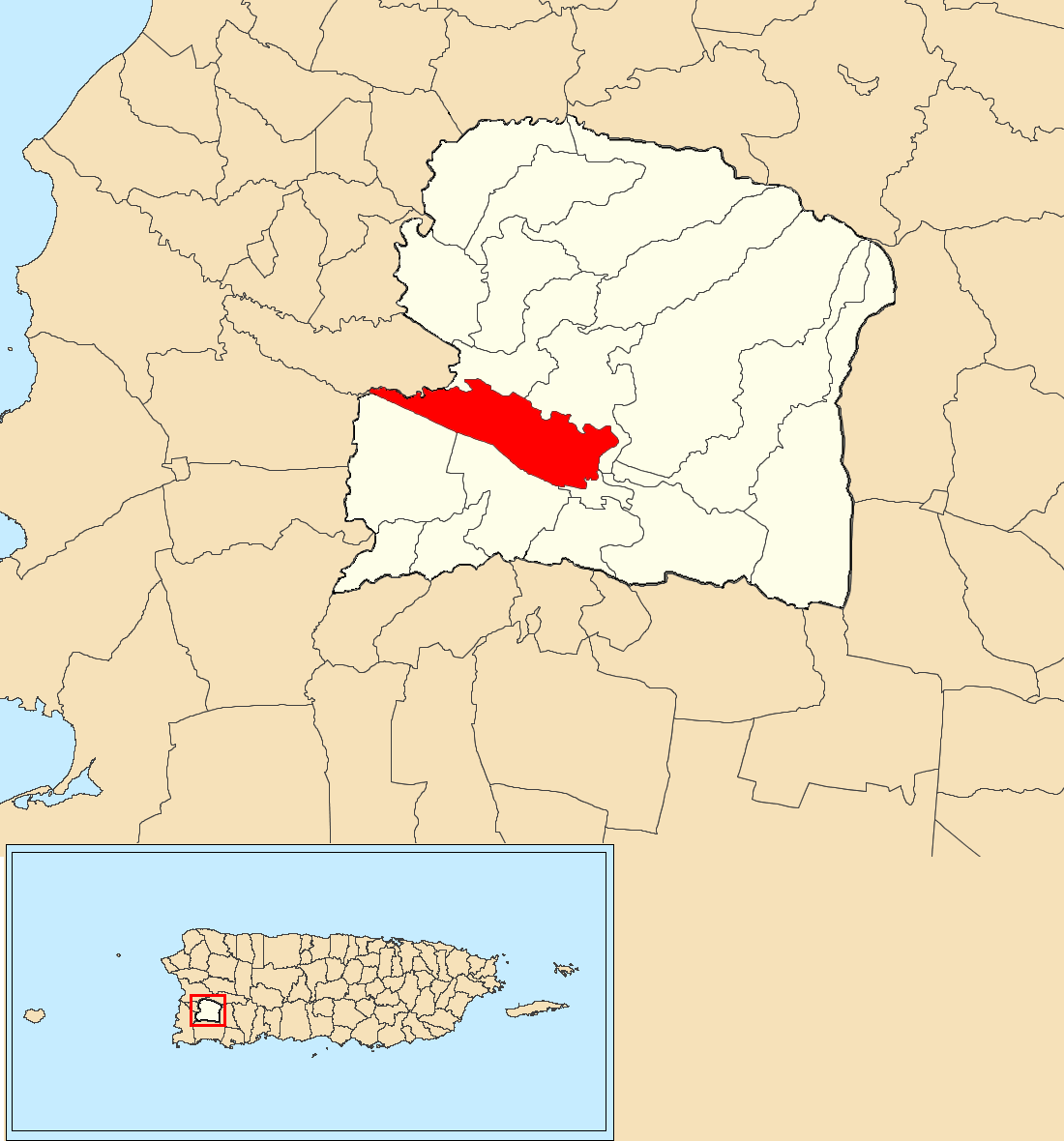
- Location of Sabana Grande Abajo within the municipality of San Germán shown in red

- Location of Puerto Rico
- Coordinates: 18°05′43″N 67°03′47″W
- Commonwealth: Puerto Rico
- Municipality: San Germán

Area
  - Total: 3.02 sq mi (7.8 km^{2})
  - Land: 3.02 sq mi (7.8 km^{2})
  - Water: 0 sq mi (0 km^{2})
- Elevation: 85 ft (26 m)

Population (2010)
  - Total: 2,712
  - Density: 898/sq mi (347/km^{2})
- Source: 2010 Census
- Time zone: UTC−4 (AST)

Sabana Grande Abajo is a barrio in the municipality of San Germán, Puerto Rico. Its population in 2010 was 2,712.

== History ==
Sabana Grande Abajo was in Spain's gazetteers until Puerto Rico was ceded by Spain in the aftermath of the Spanish–American War under the terms of the Treaty of Paris of 1898 and became an unincorporated territory of the United States. In 1899, the United States Department of War conducted a census of Puerto Rico finding that the population of Sabana Grande Abajo barrio was 1,021.

Historical population
Census	Pop.	Note	%±
1900	1,021		—
1910	1,175		15.1%
1920	1,607		36.8%
1930	1,792		11.5%
1940	1,762		−1.7%
1950	1,894		7.5%
1960	1,380		−27.1%
1970	0		−100.0%
1980	2,626		—
1990	3,029		15.3%
2000	2,603		−14.1%
2010	2,712		4.2%
U.S. Decennial Census; 1899 (shown as 1900) 1910-1930; 1930-1950 1980-2000 2010

== See also ==
- List of communities in Puerto Rico
