= Seagull intersection =

Type of three-way road intersection

Sketch in right-hand traffic layout

A seagull intersection or continuous green T-intersection (also called a turbo-T (in Florida) or High-T intersection (in Nevada and Utah)) is a type of three-way road intersection, typically used on high traffic volume roads and dual carriageways. This form of intersection is popular in Australia and New Zealand, and sometimes used in the United States and other countries.

== Design ==
Seagull intersections get their name from the pattern that the two cross-traffic turn lanes make when looking down at them from the air.

In a seagull intersection, one or more lanes of traffic on the arterial road, on the carriageway opposite the intersecting side road, are free flowing, meaning one direction of traffic on the arterial is allowed to travel straight through without stopping. The free-flowing lane(s) are called "continuous green through lane(s)" (CGTL). For the free-flowing through lanes, access into and out of the side road is provided via turn lanes separated from the through lanes in a configuration similar to exit and entrance ramps at an interchange. However, the turn lanes are at the same grade as both carriageways of the arterial and are located on the same side as the oncoming traffic.

Those wishing to turn across traffic into the side road at the intersection drive into the turn lane, which forms one "wing" of the seagull. Here, they meet the opposite carriageway and the side road. Traffic wishing to turn across traffic out of the side road cross the intersecting carriageway, drive up the other "wing" of the seagull, and merge onto the other carriageway.

For the arterial carriageway adjacent to the side road, access into and out of the side road is ordinarily handled like a conventional T intersection. However, some seagull intersections may have a second, smaller "seagull" formed by two left turning lanes into and out of the side road.

Road sign used in Florida when a continuous green through lane is ahead.

Different methods are used to control traffic where two right-turning movements and the through movement meet. Most intersections use traffic lights, while others use give way (yield) and stop signs, and sometimes roundabouts.

This design type has been proven to provide sustainable benefits when compared to the traditional T-intersection design. By reducing delay through the intersection, automobiles use less fuel on average passing through the intersection, and thus emissions are reduced across the intersection. The savings per vehicle may not seem very high, but when scaled to account for all automobiles passing through the intersection, the total emission savings are significant. Additionally, there are economic and social benefits to reducing delay time and letting drivers pass through the intersection more quickly. In the Netherlands, this type of intersection occurs by default when a T-junction has a bicycle path on the continuing road, and is not intersected by a roadway for motorized vehicles. The bicycle path may ignore red lights, but turning cyclists must wait for them.

== History ==
An experiment was done in Illinois, United States to allow going straight on red (following rules analogous to those used for turns on red) when approaching a T junction on the main road, with the intersecting road on the left; it was a failure. However, at some T junctions where the main road includes at least two lanes on the side away from the intersecting road, the furthest (rightmost, in areas where traffic drives to the right) lane is given the right of way to proceed straight through the intersection at all times, denoted by a "green arrow" signal if a traffic light is installed at the intersection. In such cases, that lane is often specially delimited with pavement markings or other lane separation devices, to keep left-turning traffic on the intersecting road from colliding with traffic proceeding through the intersection on the main road. The seagull intersection was developed as a safer variation of this.
