= Puerto Rico Highway 344 =

Highway in Puerto Rico

Highway 344
- Ruta 344

Route information
- Maintained by Puerto Rico DTPW
- Length: 6.5 km (4.0 mi)
- Existed: 1953–present

Major junctions
- South end: PR-345 in Hormigueros barrio-pueblo
- PR-3344 in Hormigueros; PR-338 in Jagüitas
- North end: PR-348 in Rosario

Location
- Country: United States
- Territory: Puerto Rico
- Municipalities: Hormigueros, Mayagüez

Highway system
- Roads in Puerto Rico; List
← PR-339	→ PR-365
← PR-3342	PR-3344	→ PR-4010

Puerto Rico Highway 344 (PR-344) is a rural road in Hormigueros, Puerto Rico, beginning from near the municipality's small downtown and ending at PR-348 near the border with San Germán in barrio Rosario. It has narrow lanes, and after about five kilometers becomes one of the most dangerous highways in Puerto Rico, as it goes near a precipice with little or no safety barriers. It serves as a route to Mayagüez via PR-348 which ends in Puerto Rico Alt Route 2 (Calle Ramón Emeterio Betances, or locally Calle Post).

== Major intersections ==
Municipality	Location	km	mi	Destinations	Notes
Hormigueros	Hormigueros barrio-pueblo	0.0	0.0	PR-345 (Calle Julio Pérez Irizarry) – Hormigueros	Southern terminus of PR-344
Hormigueros	Hormigueros	1.0	0.62	PR-3344 (Avenida Primero de Abril) – Hormigueros	
Hormigueros	Jagüitas	5.1– 5.2	3.2– 3.2	PR-338 – Lavadero	
Mayagüez	Rosario	6.5	4.0	PR-348 – Mayagüez, Rosario	Northern terminus of PR-344
1.000 mi = 1.609 km; 1.000 km = 0.621 mi

== Related route ==
Highway 3344
- Location: Hormigueros
- Length: 1.3 km (0.81 mi)

Puerto Rico Highway 3344 (PR-3344) is a spur route located in Hormigueros. It begins at PR-344 north of downtown and ends at its junction with PR-309 near PR-2. The entire route is located in Hormigueros.

Location	km	mi	Destinations	Notes
Hormigueros barrio-pueblo	1.3	0.81	PR-309 to PR-2 (Expreso Eugenio María de Hostos) / PR-319 – Hormigueros, Mayagüez, San Germán	Southern terminus of PR-3344
Hormigueros barrio-pueblo–Hormigueros line	0.8	0.50	PR-345 (Calle Julio Pérez Irizarry) – Hormigueros	
Hormigueros	0.0	0.0	PR-344 – Hormigueros, Rosario	Northern terminus of PR-3344
1.000 mi = 1.609 km; 1.000 km = 0.621 mi

== See also ==
- 1953 Puerto Rico highway renumbering
