= Basilica of Our Lady of Montserrat =

Historic church in Hormigueros, Puerto Rico

Basilica of Our Lady of Monserrat
- Minor Basilica of the Black Virgin of Monserrat
- Basilica de la Virgen Negra del Monserrate
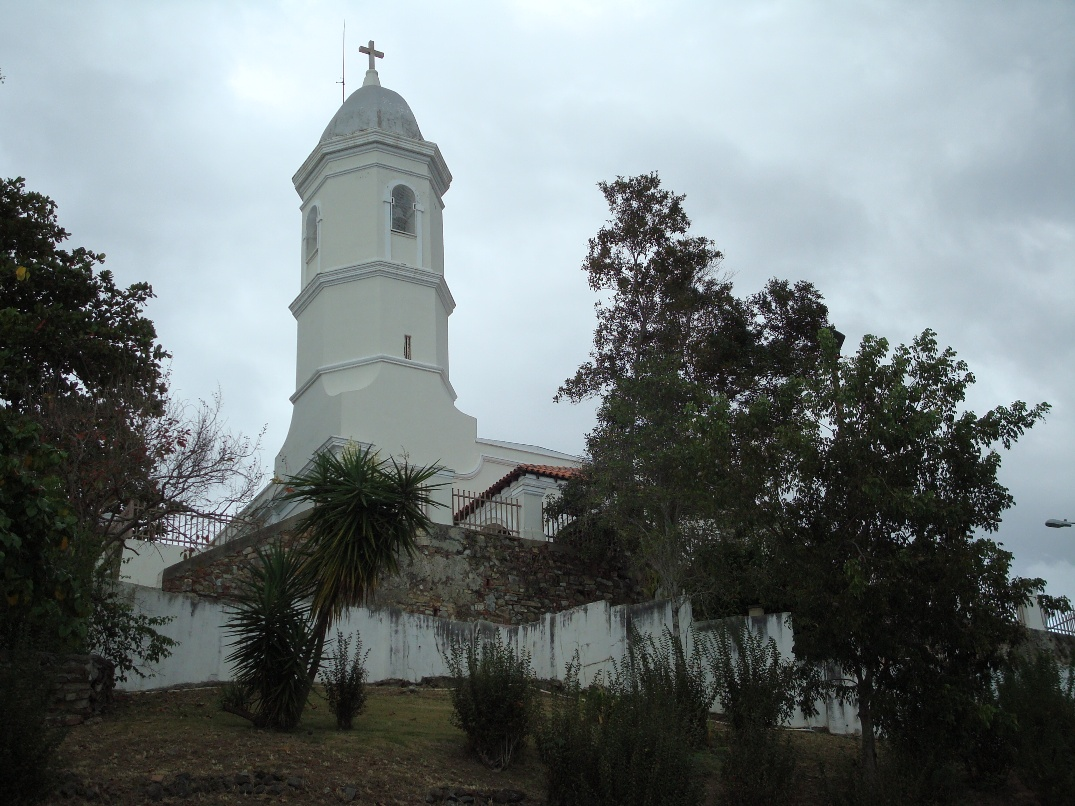
- View of the basilica shrine in 2008

- Location in Puerto Rico
- 18°08′26″N 67°07′38″W
- Location: Hormigueros, Hormigueros, Puerto Rico
- Address: 1 Calle Peregrinos, Hormigueros, Puerto Rico
- Country: Puerto Rico
- Denomination: Roman Catholic Church
- Website: diocesisdemayaguez.org/basilica-nuestra-senora-de-la-monserrate

History
- Status: Minor basilica
- Founded: 1570
- Dedication: Virgin of Montserrat
- Dedicated: February 12, 1995
- Earlier dedication: July 18, 1994

Architecture
- Functional status: Parish church
- Heritage designation: NRHP
- Designated: 1975
- Architectural type: Neoclassical Spanish Revival
- Style: Mozarabic
- Years built: 1750-1799
- Groundbreaking: 1590

Administration
- Diocese: Mayagüez
- Santuario de la Monserate de Hormigueros and Casa de Peregrinos
- U.S. National Register of Historic Places
- Built: 19th-century
- NRHP reference No.: 75002134
- Added to NRHP: April 17, 1975

The Basilica of Our Lady of Montserrat of Hormigueros or Basilica of the Black Virgin of Monserrat (Spanish: Basilica de la Virgen Negra del Monserrate) is a historic Roman Catholic parish church, shrine and minor basilica built in the town of Hormigueros, Puerto Rico, dedicated to the Blessed Virgin Mary as a Black Madonna under the Marian title of “Virgin of Montserrat”.

Pope John Paul II granted a pontifical decree of canonical coronation titled Omnibus Manifestum towards its venerated Marian image on July 18, 1994. The former Archbishop of San Juan, Cardinal Luis Aponte Martínez, executed the rite of coronation on February 12, 1995. The same Pontiff issued a decree titled Celeberrimum in Civitate that raised the sanctuary to the status of a minor basilica on May 19, 1998.

== History ==
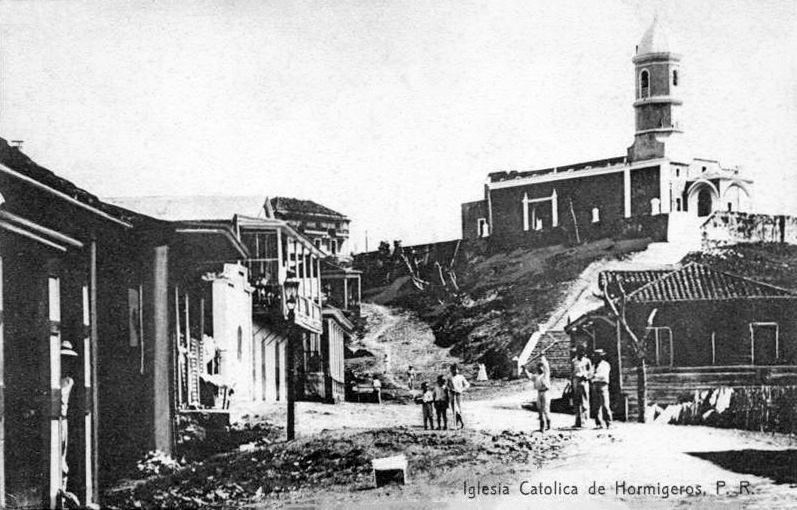
The church in 1905

The foundation of the basilica is on the site of a rural chapel built by the Catalan estate owner Don Gerardo González, who was the owner of the valleys of the region. Although the specific date when the original chapel was constructed is not known, some records date it as far as 1590. Also, radiocarbon dating tests done to pieces of wood from a coffin found in the basilica point to the existence of the chapel as far back as 1570.

The structure combines romantic elements and styles in its architecture, including a bell tower with Mozarabic elements.

In 1696, the chapel acquired a guest house called Casa de Peregrinos (Pilgrims House). In 1814, Juan Alejo de Arizmendi, the first native Puerto Rican bishop, fell ill in this house after traveling around the island in his second pastoral visit. He desired to be buried in his beloved chapel. He died in Arecibo the following October 12, but his wishes were not followed, burial instead taking place in his cathedral. The house is now the rectory of the basilica.

The basilica and its rectory were listed on the National Register of Historic Places in 1975 as the Santuario de la Monserate de Hormigueros and Casa de Peregrinos. It was also added to the Puerto Rico Register of Historic Sites and Zones in 2000.

On 19 May 1998, Pope John Paul II issued a pontifical decree that raised the status of the structure to a minor basilica, a distinction held previously on the island only by the Cathedral of San Juan Bautista in the capital.

On 24 October 1999, the Archbishop of San Juan, Roberto González Nieves, Roberto González Nieves read the papal decree before the public in commemoration of the shrine's 400th centennial anniversary.

== Folklore ==
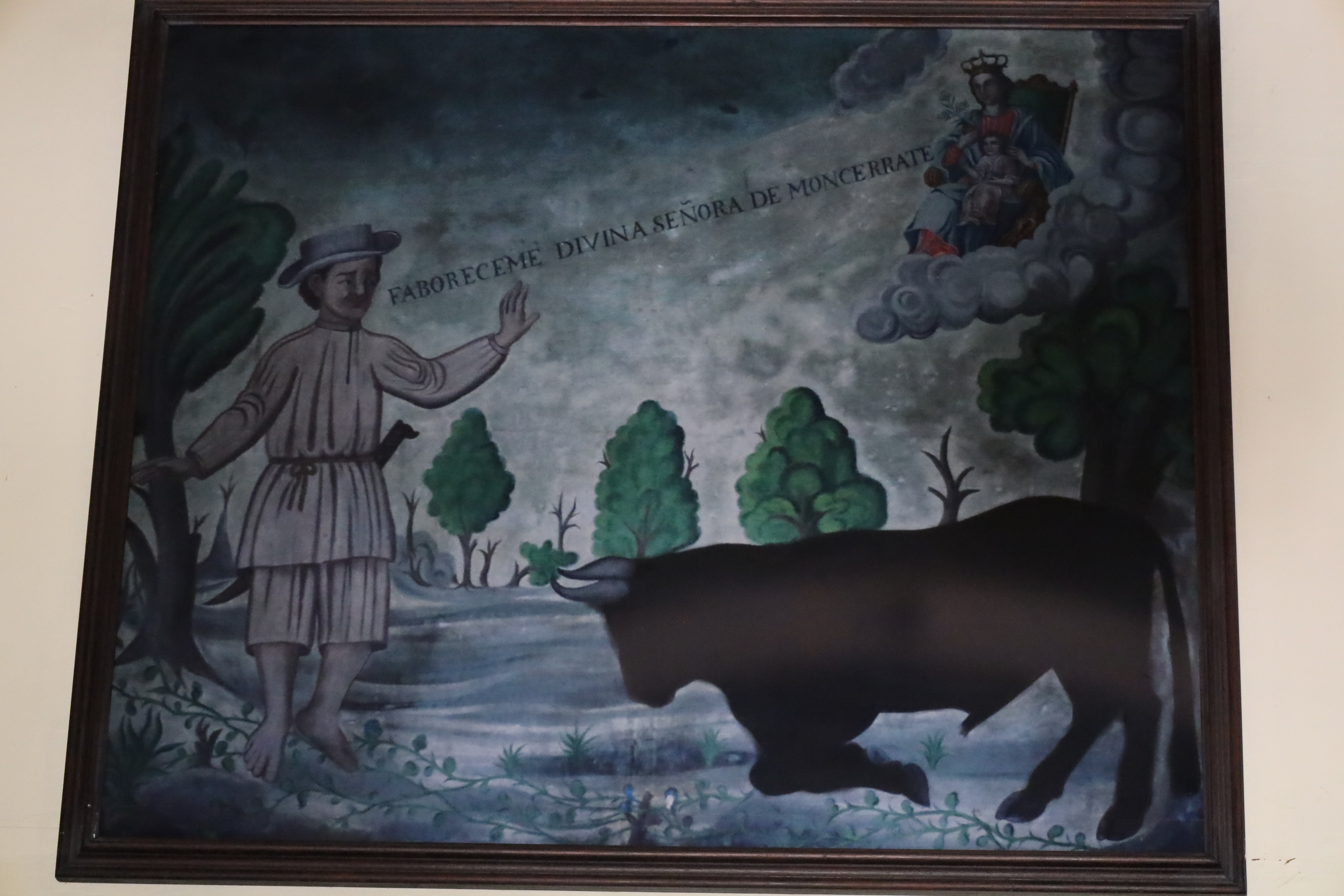
Painting depicting the Marian apparition

There is folklore about the town's founder, an explanation of why the church in the town, Basílica Menor de la Virgen de Monserrate, became so important.

The legend has to do with the townspeople aiding Geraldo in finding his eight-year-old daughter, "with eyes as blue as the turquoise skies", when she disappeared. When his daughter was found 15 days later she was unharmed, not hungry, and unafraid and happily explained that a beautiful, black woman had helped her, caressed her face and given her fruit. Geraldo reported it was the Virgin of Montserrat and Geraldo said that for having helped his daughter she would be venerated for all ages. Many people heard of the tale but it had not been the first tale from Geraldo. The first and more popular tale from Geraldo had been that a savage bull was going to attack him and when he prayed, the bull bent its knees, bowed its head to the ground, and didn't attack. Some versions of the story state the bull's legs actually broke rendering the bull immobile and unable to charge at him. Since then, many Catholics perform penitence by walking the steps to the church on their knees. Many pilgrimages have been made to the church, even as early as in the 17th century.

== Gallery ==
Exterior

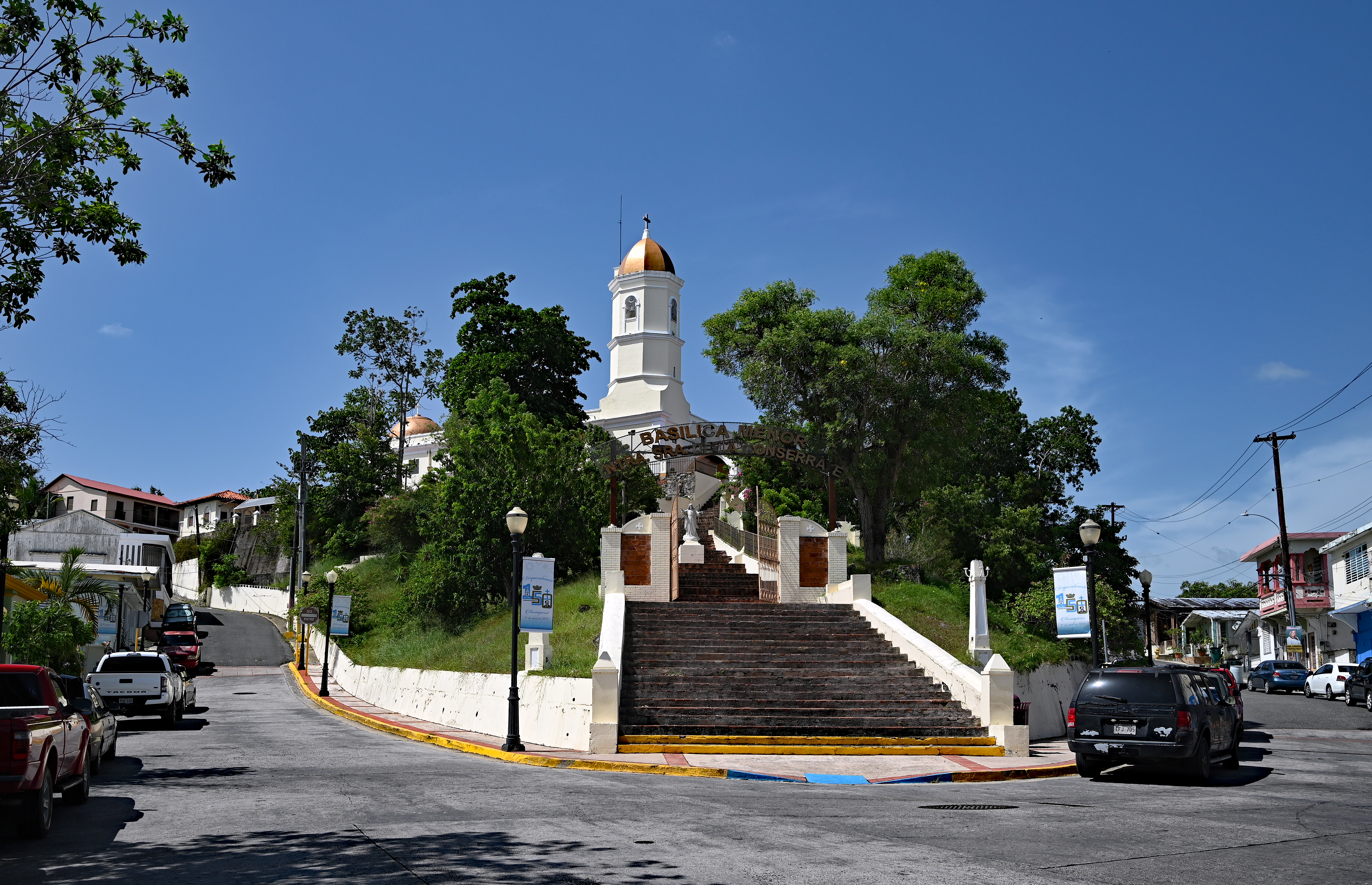
Church and hill in 2024

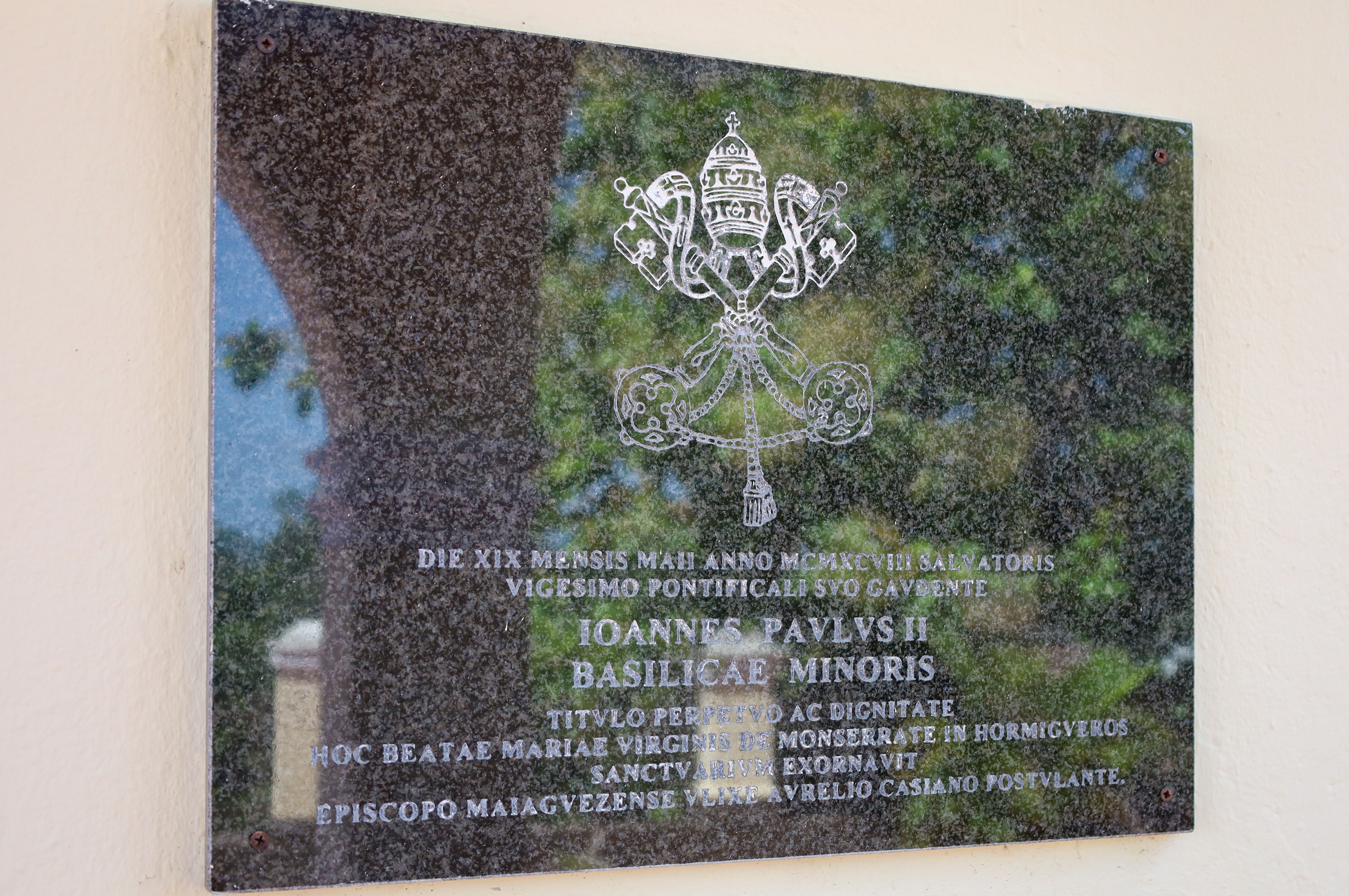
Celeberrimum in Civitate decree

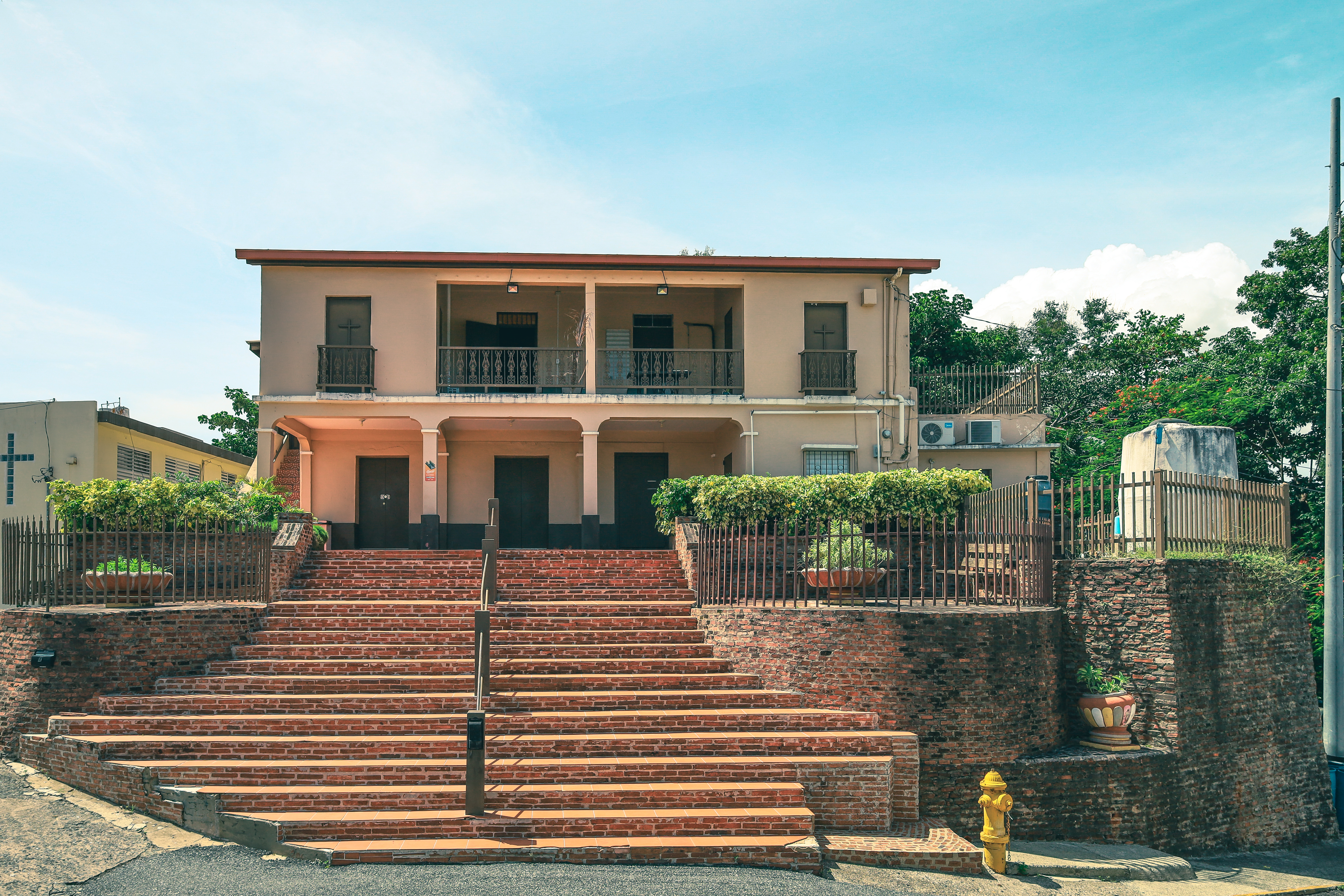
Pilgrimage house, now the parish rectory

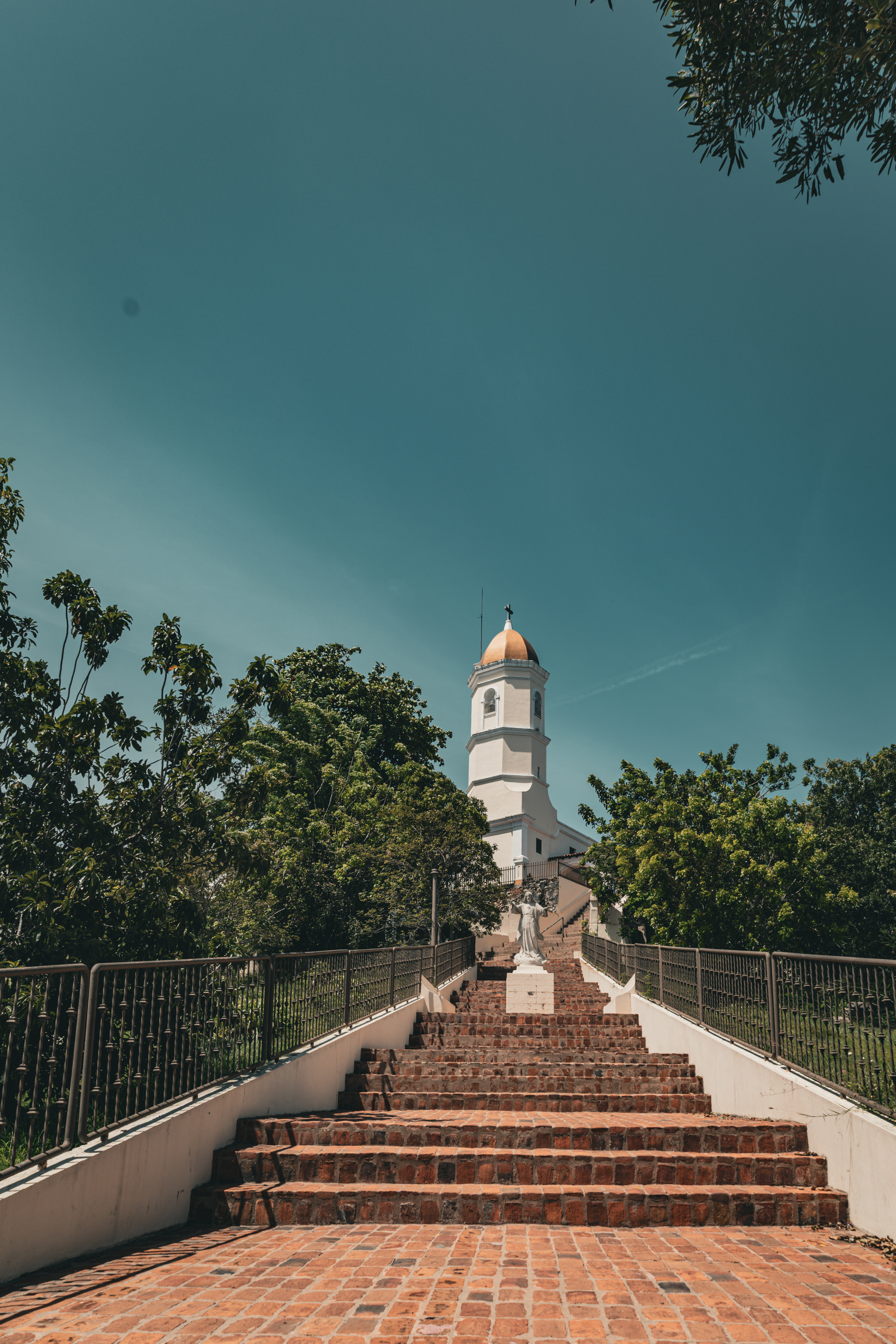
Pilgrimage stairway in 2024

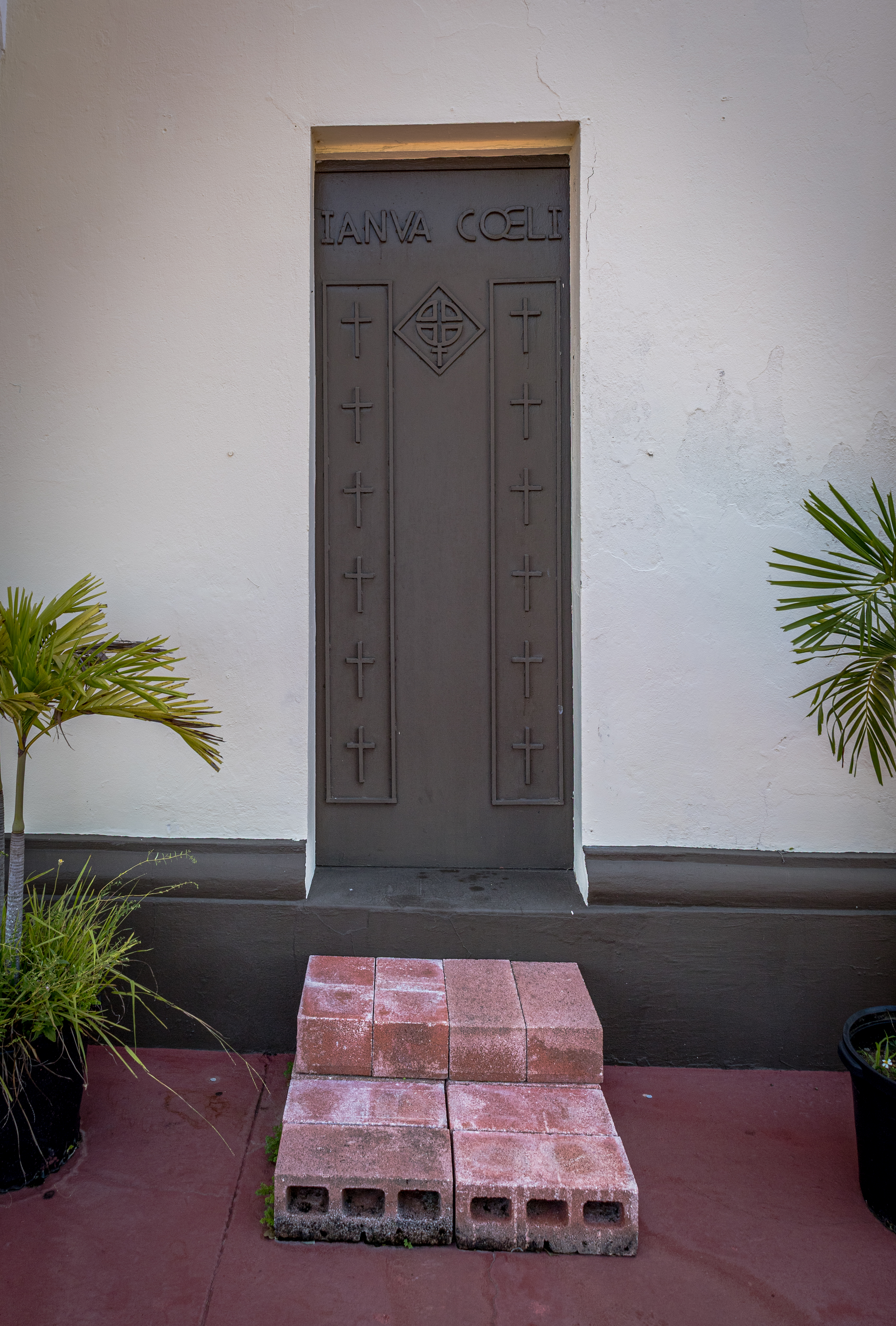
Heaven doorway
Interior

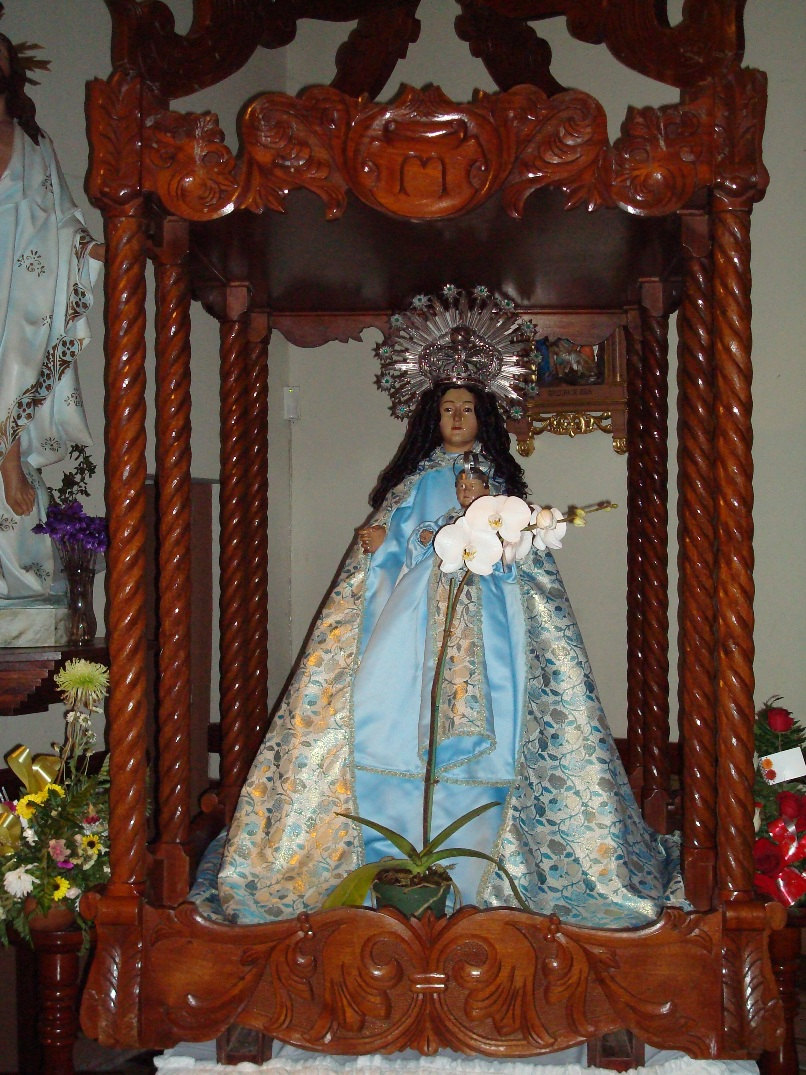
1740 vested image of “Virgin of Monserrate” which was granted a formal decree of Canonical coronation by Pope John Paul II in 1994

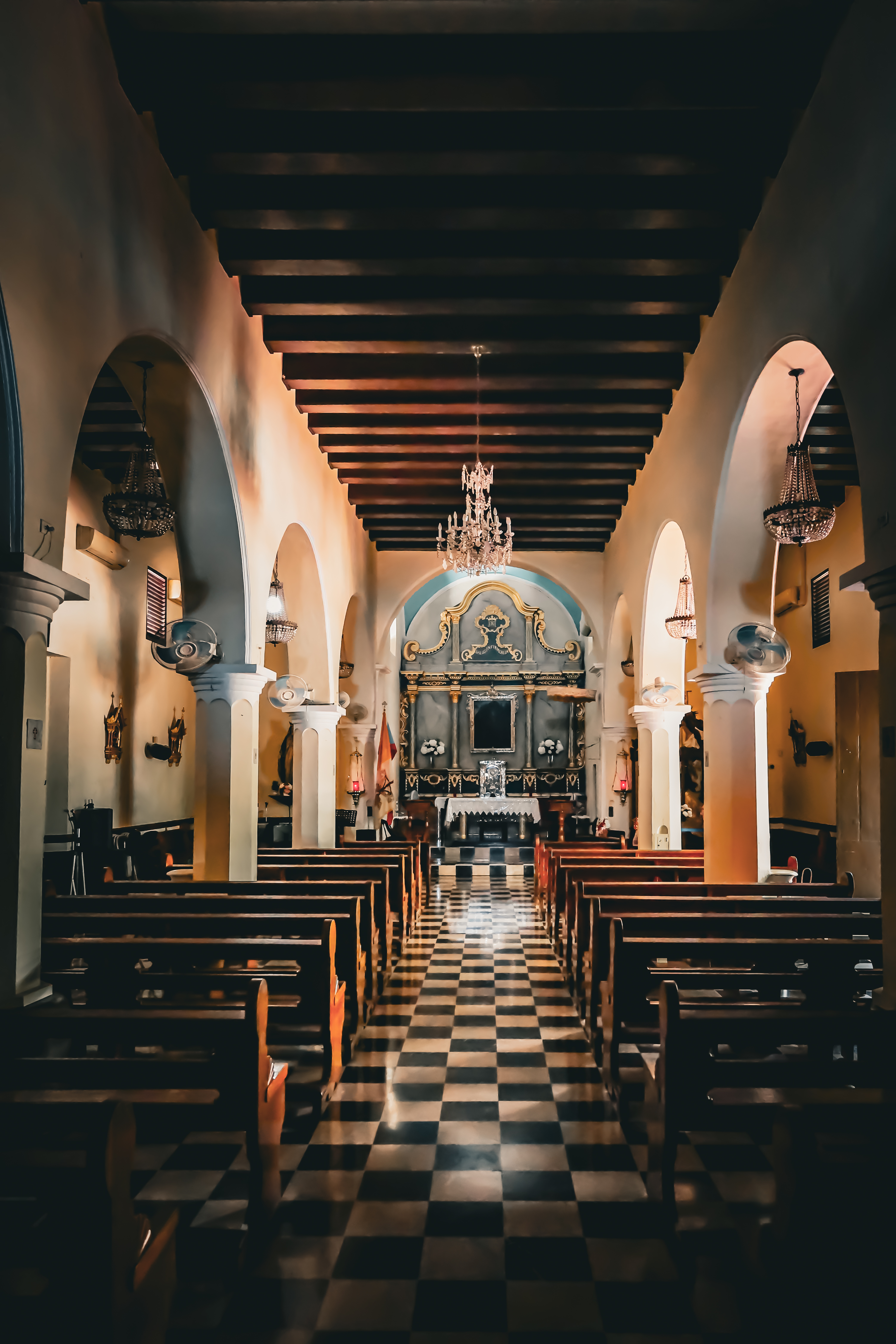
Central nave

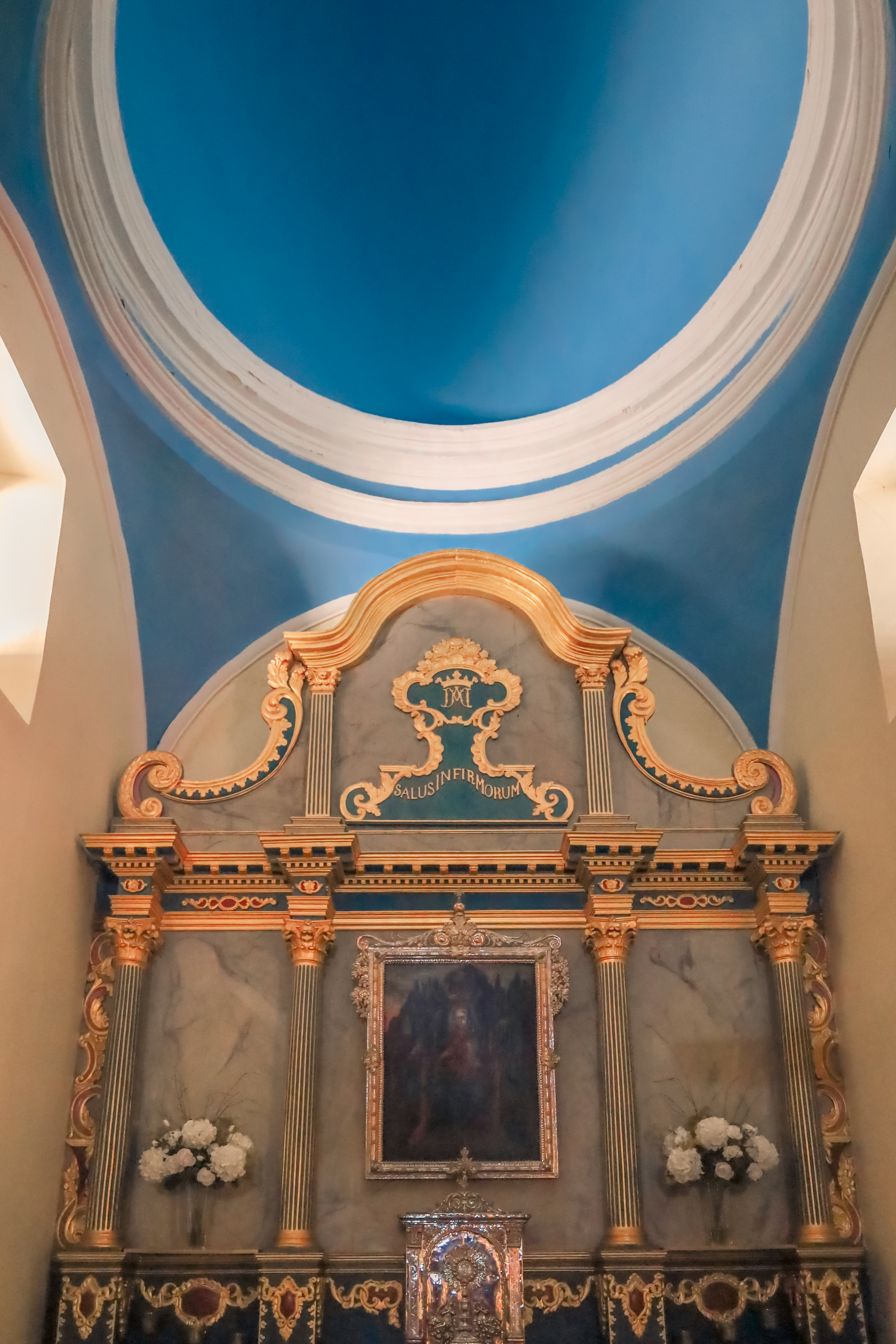
Main altarpiece

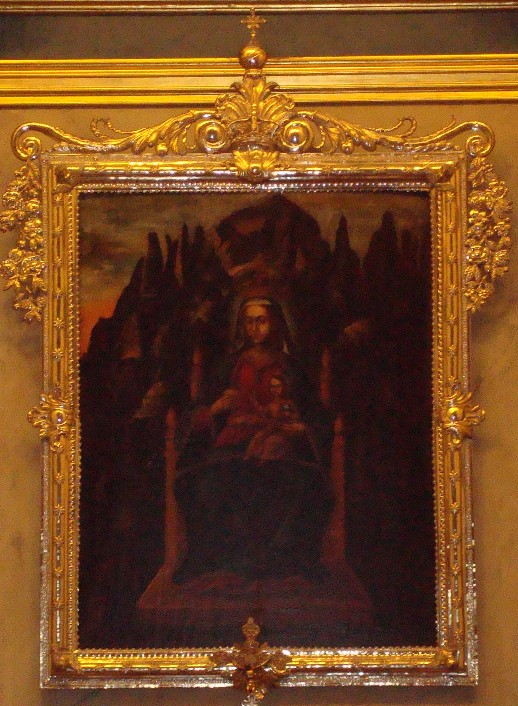
Virgin of Montserrat icon

== See also ==
- Roman Catholic Diocese of Mayagüez
- National Register of Historic Places in Hormigueros, Puerto Rico
- Latin American miracles
- List of the oldest buildings in Puerto Rico
- Votive offering
