= List of barrios and sectors of Hormigueros, Puerto Rico =

Like all municipalities of Puerto Rico, Hormigueros is subdivided into administrative units called barrios, which are, in contemporary times, roughly comparable to minor civil divisions, (and means wards or boroughs or neighborhoods in English). The barrios and subbarrios, in turn, are further subdivided into smaller local populated place areas/units called sectores (sectors in English). The types of sectores may vary, from normally sector to urbanización to reparto to barriada to residencial, among others. Some sectors appear in two barrios.

Hormigueros map based on 2010 US Census map showing barrios, some sectors, highways and roads in Hormigueros

== List of sectors by barrio ==
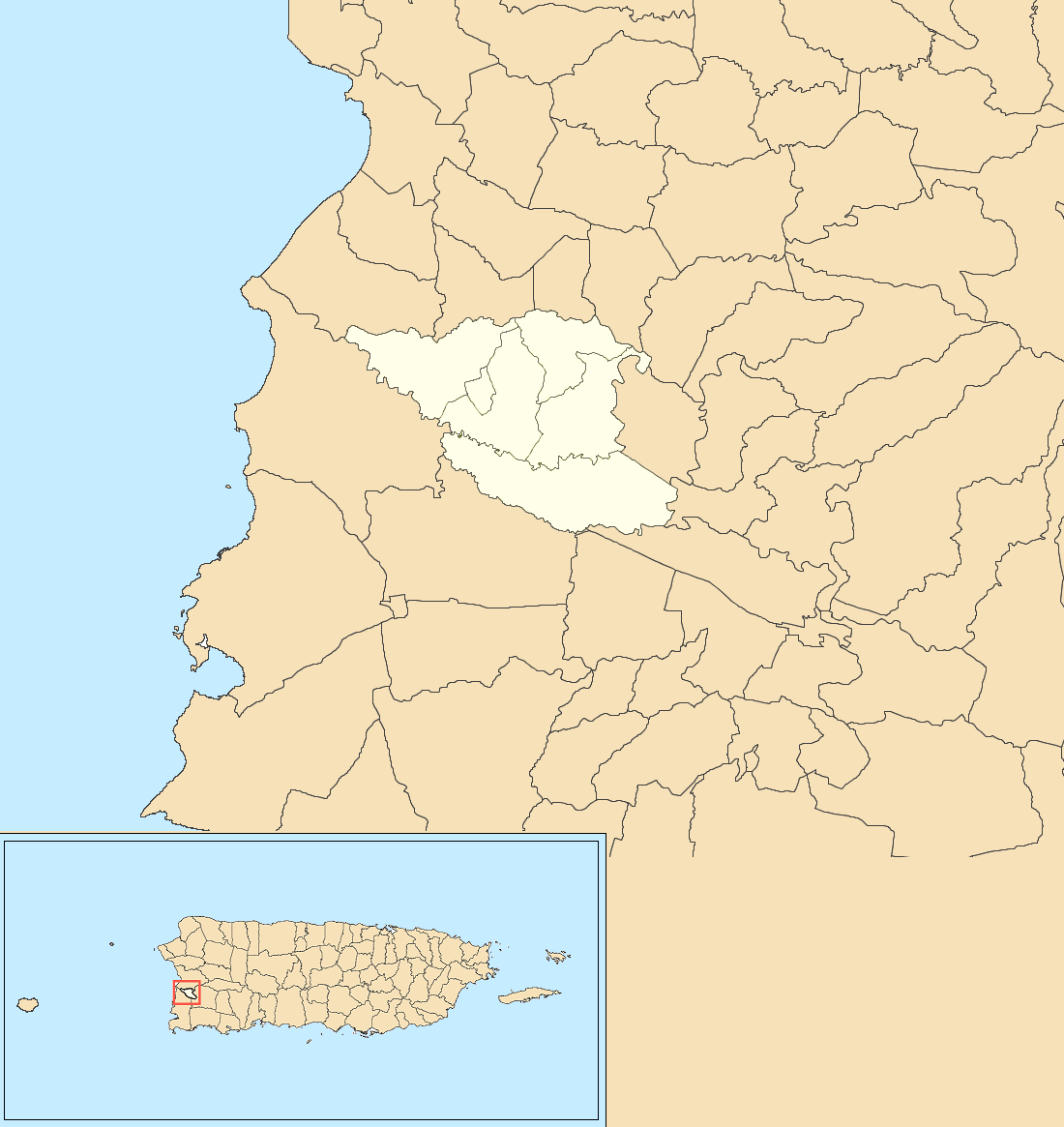
Hormigueros map with barrio subdivisions

=== Benavente ===
- Sector Eureka

=== Guanajibo ===
- Calle La Ceiba
- Camino Cachito
- Camino Fian Toro
- Camino Justo Colón
- Camino Los Barbosa
- Carretera 343 (until km 2.3)
- Égida Presbiteriana del Ángel
- Hogar Eterno Paraíso de Amor
- Hogar San José
- Parcelas San Romualdo
- Reparto Santa Ana
- Sector Higinia Vázquez
- Sector Hoya Grande
- Sector Las Plumas
- Sector Los Quiles
- Sector Los Santana
- Sector Punto Cubano
- Urbanización Buenaventura
- Urbanización Paseo Loma Linda
- Urbanización Monte Bello
- Urbanización Valle Hermoso
- Urbanización Villa Zoraida

=== Hormigueros ===
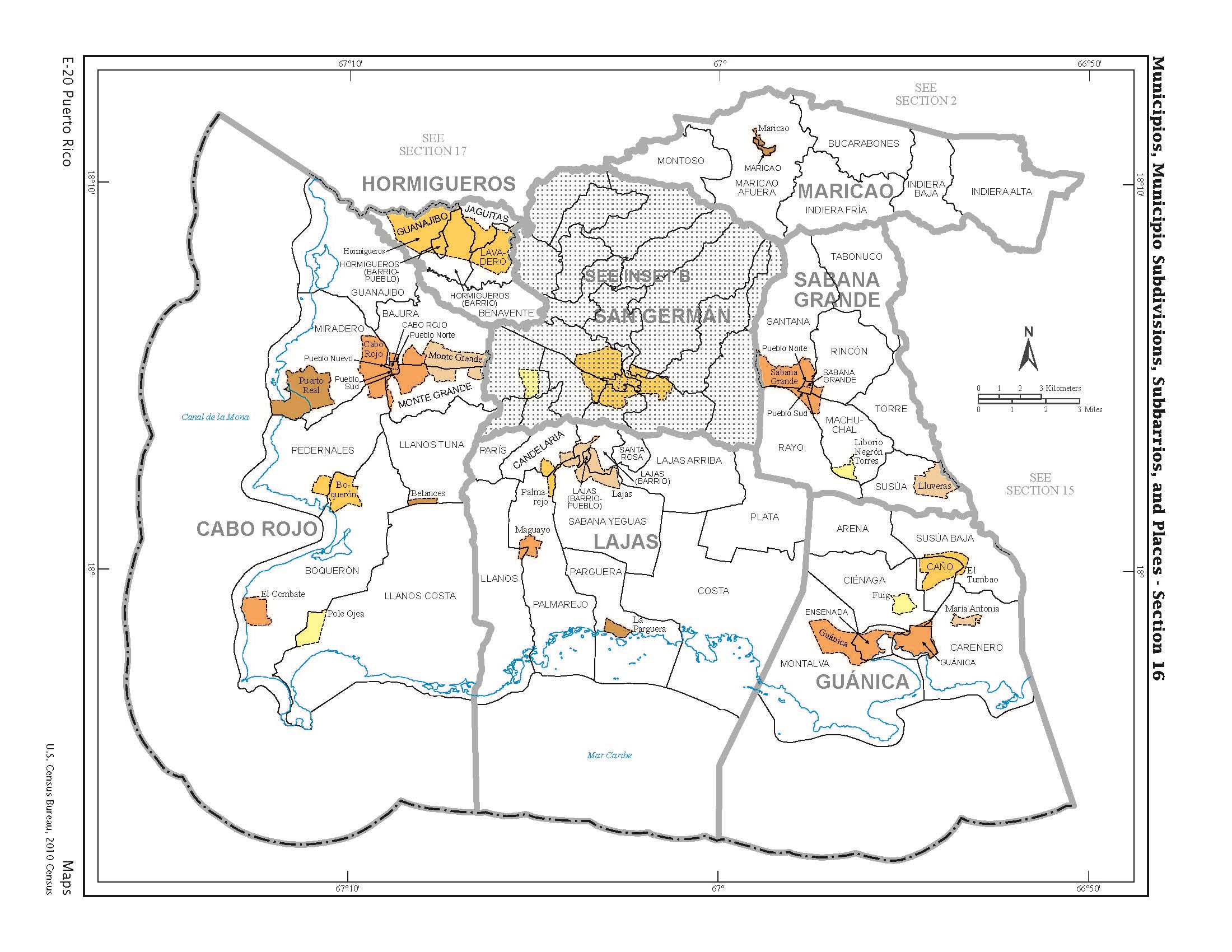
US 2010 Census map showing Hormigueros and its southern and eastern neighboring municipios

- Apartamentos Balcones de Casa Blanca
- Calle Gandules
- Carretera 346 (km 2.0)
- Condominio Monserrate Eldely Apartments
- Hormigueros Apartments
- Reparto Las Delicias
- Sector Cuqui Cabrera
- Sector Monte Cristo
- Urbanización Colinas del Oeste
- Urbanización Estancias del Río
- Urbanización Jardines San Francisco
- Urbanización La Monserrate
- Urbanización Mansiones La Monserrate
- Urbanización Verdún
- Urbanización Verdún II

=== Hormigueros barrio-pueblo ===
- Apartamentos Monserrate Court
- Camino Waldemar Rivera
- Residencial Gabriel Soler
- Sector Los Barros

=== Jagüitas ===
- Camino Francisco Cruz
- Camino Julio Minguela
- Reparto Vista Hermosa
- Sector Bracero (from km 2.4 of Carretera 344 onwards)
- Sector Cuchilla
- Sector El Caracol
- Sector Fondo del Saco
- Sector Los Ayala
- Sector Plan Bonito
- Sector Quintana
- Urbanización Paseo Los Peregrinos

=== Lavadero ===
- Camino Guarema
- Camino Los Espolas
- Haciendas Constancia
- Reparto Brisas de Lavadero
- Reparto Loma Linda
- Reparto San Gabriel
- Sector Campo Alegre
- Sector Coloso Medina
- Sector El Hoyo
- Sector La Loma
- Urbanización Jardines de la Casona
- Urbanización Paseo La Ceiba
- Urbanización San José
- Urbanización Villas de Lavadero

== See also ==
- List of communities in Puerto Rico
