= Guanajibo, Hormigueros, Puerto Rico =

Barrio of Puerto Rico

Guanajibo
- Barrio
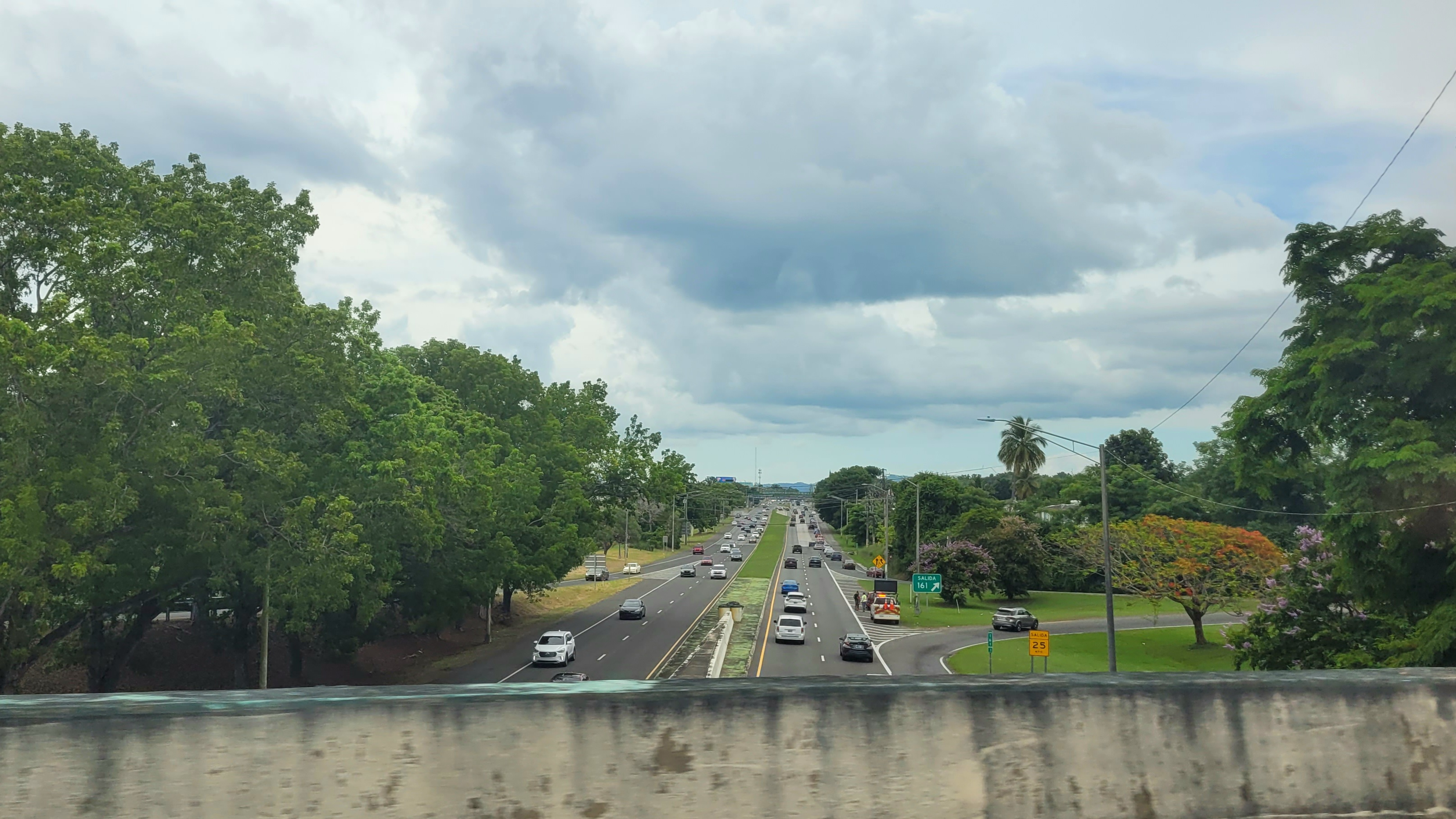
- Puerto Rico Highway 2 in Guanajibo

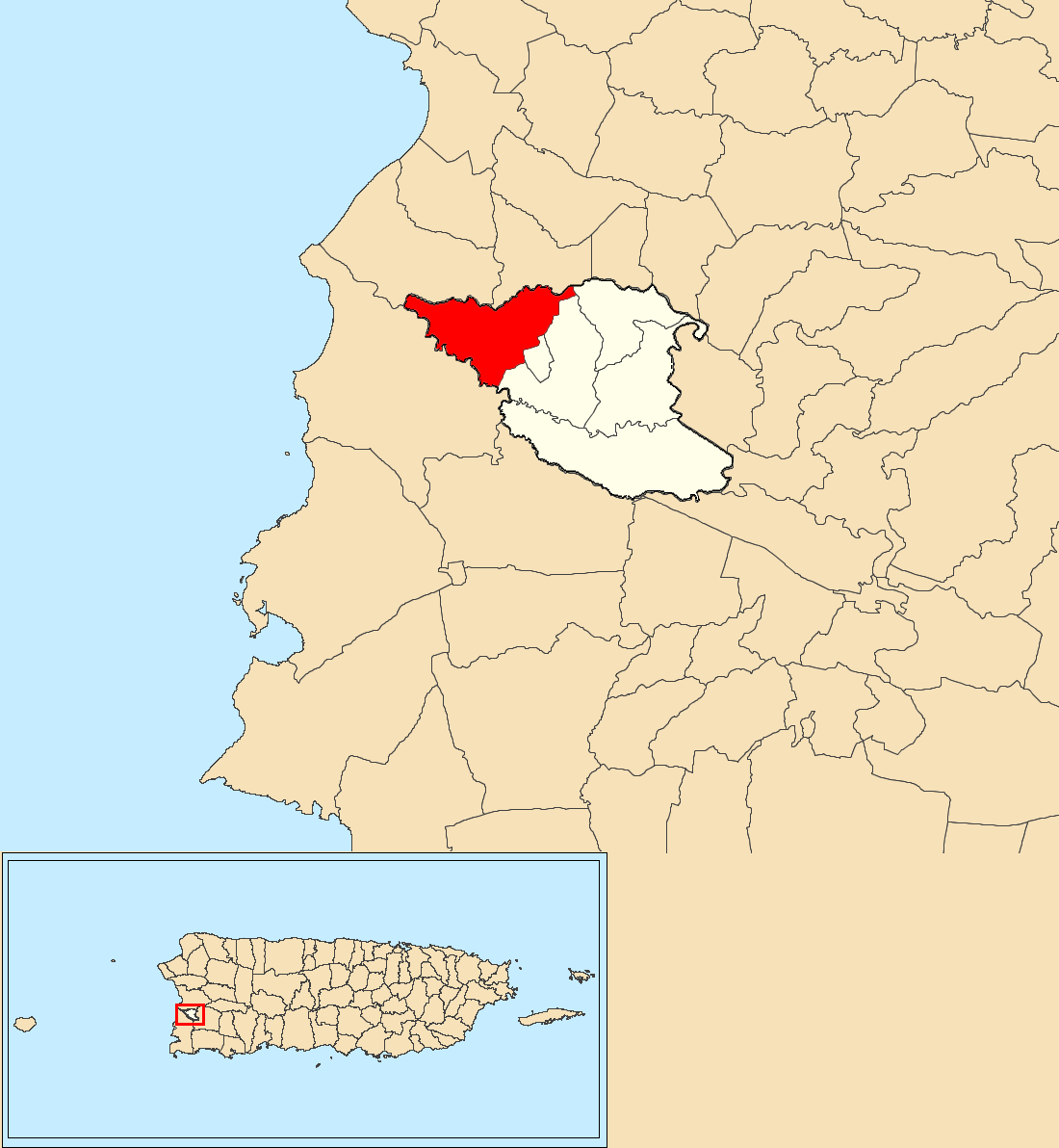
- Location of Guanajibo within the municipality of Hormigueros shown in red

- Location of Puerto Rico
- Coordinates: 18°08′47″N 67°08′13″W
- Commonwealth: Puerto Rico
- Municipality: Hormigueros

Area
  - Total: 2.33 sq mi (6.0 km^{2})
  - Land: 2.33 sq mi (6.0 km^{2})
  - Water: 0 sq mi (0 km^{2})
- Elevation: 151 ft (46 m)

Population (2010)
  - Total: 5,959
  - Density: 2,557.5/sq mi (987.5/km^{2})
- Source: 2010 Census
- Time zone: UTC−4 (AST)
- ZIP Code: 00660

Guanajibo is a barrio in the municipality of Hormigueros, Puerto Rico. Its population in 2010 was 5,959.

== History ==
Guanajibo was in Spain's gazetteers until Puerto Rico was ceded by Spain in the aftermath of the Spanish–American War under the terms of the Treaty of Paris of 1898 and became an unincorporated territory of the United States. In 1899, the United States Department of War conducted a census of Puerto Rico finding that the combined population of Guanajibo and Pueblo barrios was 1,203.

Historical population
Census	Pop.	Note	%±
1910	896		—
1920	1,004		12.1%
1930	1,050		4.6%
1940	1,329		26.6%
1950	1,729		30.1%
1960	1,977		14.3%
1970	0		−100.0%
1980	6,103		—
1990	6,244		2.3%
2000	6,437		3.1%
2010	5,959		−7.4%
U.S. Decennial Census; 1900 (N/A) 1910-1930; 1930-1950 1980-2000 2010

== Sectors ==
Barrios (which are, in contemporary times, roughly comparable to minor civil divisions) in turn are further subdivided into smaller local populated place areas/units called sectores (sectors in English). The types of sectores may vary, from normally sector to urbanización to reparto to barriada to residencial, among others.

The following sectors are in Guanajibo barrio:

Calle La Ceiba, Camino Cachito, Camino Fian Toro, Camino Justo Colón, Camino Los Barbosa, Carretera 343 (until km 2.3), Égida Presbiteriana del Ángel, Hogar Eterno Paraíso de Amor, Hogar San José, Parcelas San Romualdo, Reparto Santa Ana, Sector Higinia Vázquez, Sector Hoya Grande, Sector Las Plumas, Sector Los Quiles, Sector Los Santana (both sides), Sector Punto Cubano, Urbanización Buenaventura, Urbanización Paseo Loma Linda, Urbanización Monte Bello, Urbanización Valle Hermoso, and Urbanización Villa Zoraida.

== See also ==
- List of communities in Puerto Rico
- List of barrios and sectors of Hormigueros, Puerto Rico
