= Benavente, Hormigueros, Puerto Rico =

Barrio of Puerto Rico

Benavente
- Barrio
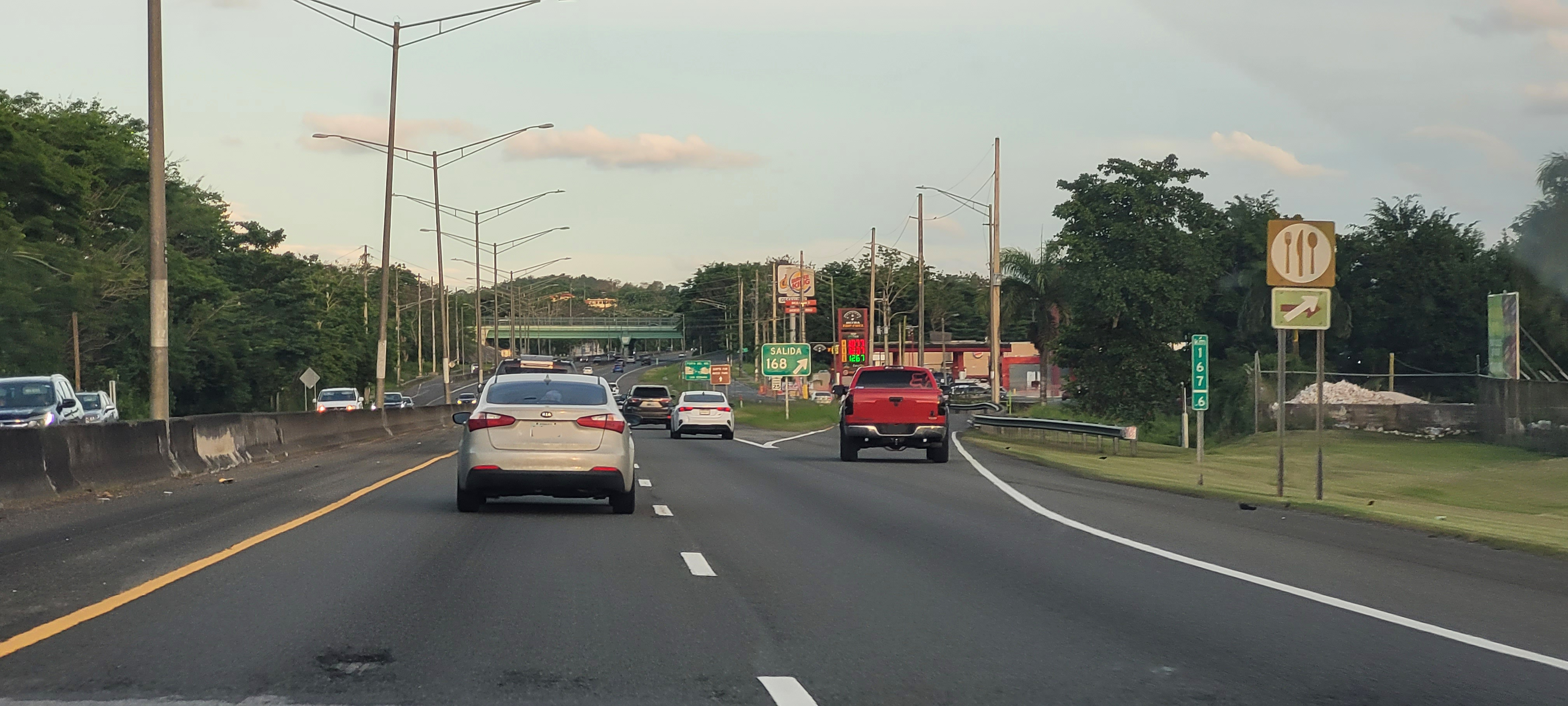
- Puerto Rico Highway 2 between Benavente and Duey Bajo

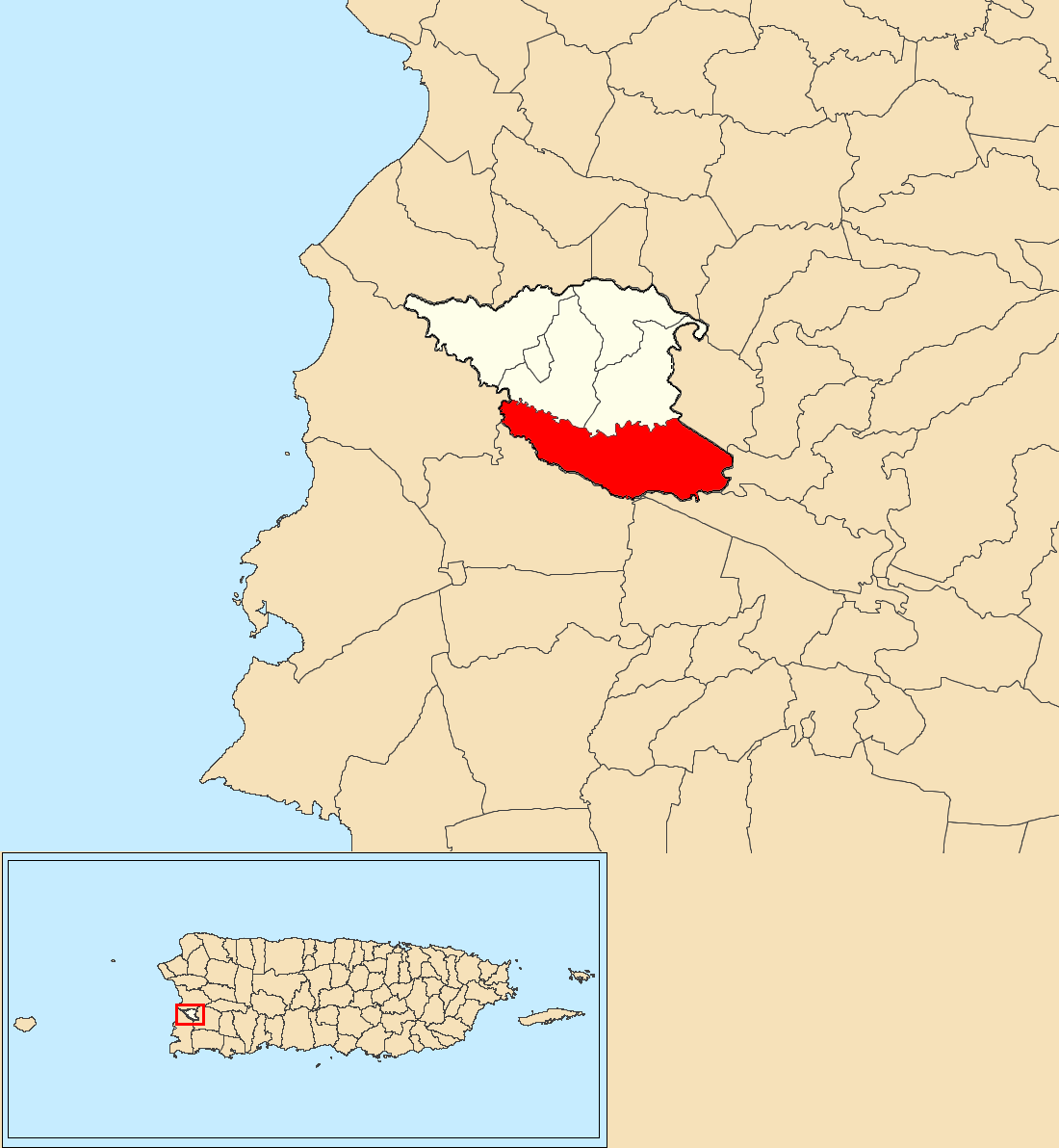
- Location of Benavente within the municipality of Hormigueros shown in red

- Location of Puerto Rico
- Coordinates: 18°06′59″N 67°06′17″W
- Commonwealth: Puerto Rico
- Municipality: Hormigueros

Area
  - Total: 3.49 sq mi (9.0 km^{2})
  - Land: 3.49 sq mi (9.0 km^{2})
  - Water: 0 sq mi (0 km^{2})
- Elevation: 52 ft (16 m)

Population (2010)
  - Total: 40
  - Density: 11.4/sq mi (4.4/km^{2})
- Source: 2010 Census
- Time zone: UTC−4 (AST)
- Zip code: 00660

Benavente is a barrio in the municipality of Hormigueros, Puerto Rico. Its population in 2010 was 40.

== History ==
Benavente was in Spain's gazetteers until Puerto Rico was ceded by Spain in the aftermath of the Spanish–American War under the terms of the Treaty of Paris of 1898 and became an unincorporated territory of the United States. In 1899, the United States Department of War conducted a census of Puerto Rico finding that the combined population of Benavente and Lavadero barrios was 1,047.

Historical population
Census	Pop.	Note	%±
1910	500		—
1920	528		5.6%
1930	741		40.3%
1940	727		−1.9%
1950	682		−6.2%
1960	674		−1.2%
1970	380		−43.6%
1980	117		−69.2%
1990	86		−26.5%
2000	298		246.5%
2010	40		−86.6%
U.S. Decennial Census; 1900 (N/A) 1910-1930; 1930-1950 1980-2000 2010

== Sectors ==
Barrios (which are, in contemporary times, roughly comparable to minor civil divisions) in turn are further subdivided into smaller local populated place areas/units called sectores (sectors in English). The types of sectores may vary, from normally sector to urbanización to reparto to barriada to residencial, among others.

The following sectors are in Benavente barrio:

Sector Eureka.

== See also ==
- List of communities in Puerto Rico
- List of barrios and sectors of Hormigueros, Puerto Rico
