= Jagüitas =

Barrio of Hormigueros, Puerto Rico

- Barrio
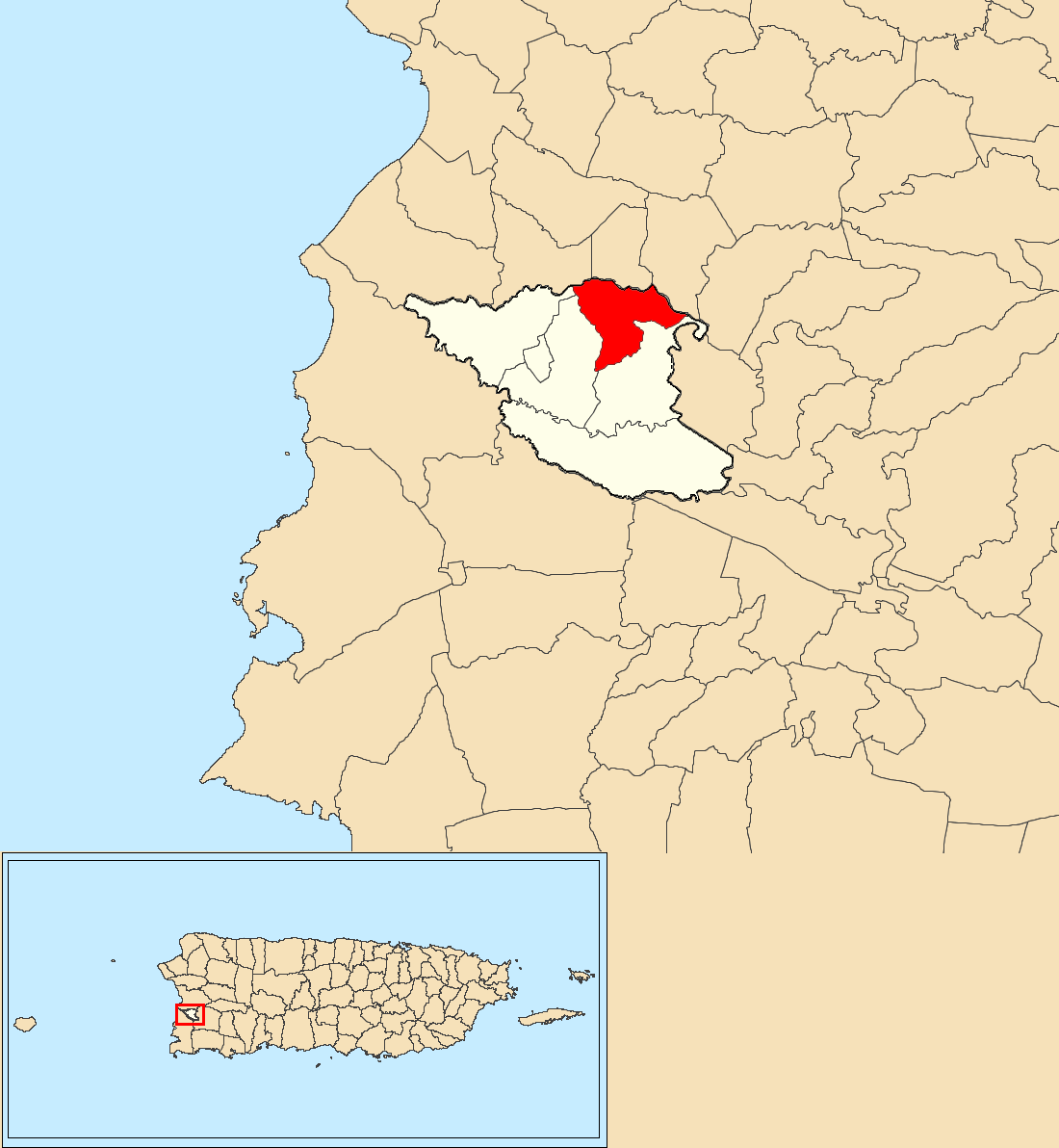
- Location of Jagüitas within the municipality of Hormigueros shown in red

- Location of Puerto Rico
- Coordinates: 18°09′03″N 67°06′20″W
- Commonwealth: Puerto Rico
- Municipality: Hormigueros

Area
  - Total: 1.42 sq mi (3.7 km^{2})
  - Land: 1.42 sq mi (3.7 km^{2})
  - Water: 0 sq mi (0 km^{2})
- Elevation: 230 ft (70 m)

Population (2010)
  - Total: 1,384
  - Density: 974.6/sq mi (376.3/km^{2})
- Source: 2010 Census
- Time zone: UTC−4 (AST)
- ZIP Code: 00660

Jagüitas is a barrio in the municipality of Hormigueros, Puerto Rico. Its population in 2010 was 1,384.

== History ==
Jagüitas was in Spain's gazetteers until Puerto Rico was ceded by Spain in the aftermath of the Spanish–American War under the terms of the Treaty of Paris of 1898 and became an unincorporated territory of the United States. In 1899, the United States Department of War conducted a census of Puerto Rico finding that the combined population of Jagüitas and Hormigueros barrios was 965.

Historical population
Census	Pop.	Note	%±
1910	649		—
1920	787		21.3%
1930	729		−7.4%
1940	735		0.8%
1950	797		8.4%
1960	875		9.8%
1970	761		−13.0%
1980	1,293		69.9%
1990	1,517		17.3%
2000	1,658		9.3%
2010	1,384		−16.5%
U.S. Decennial Census; 1900 (N/A) 1910-1930; 1930-1950 1980-2000 2010

== Sectors ==
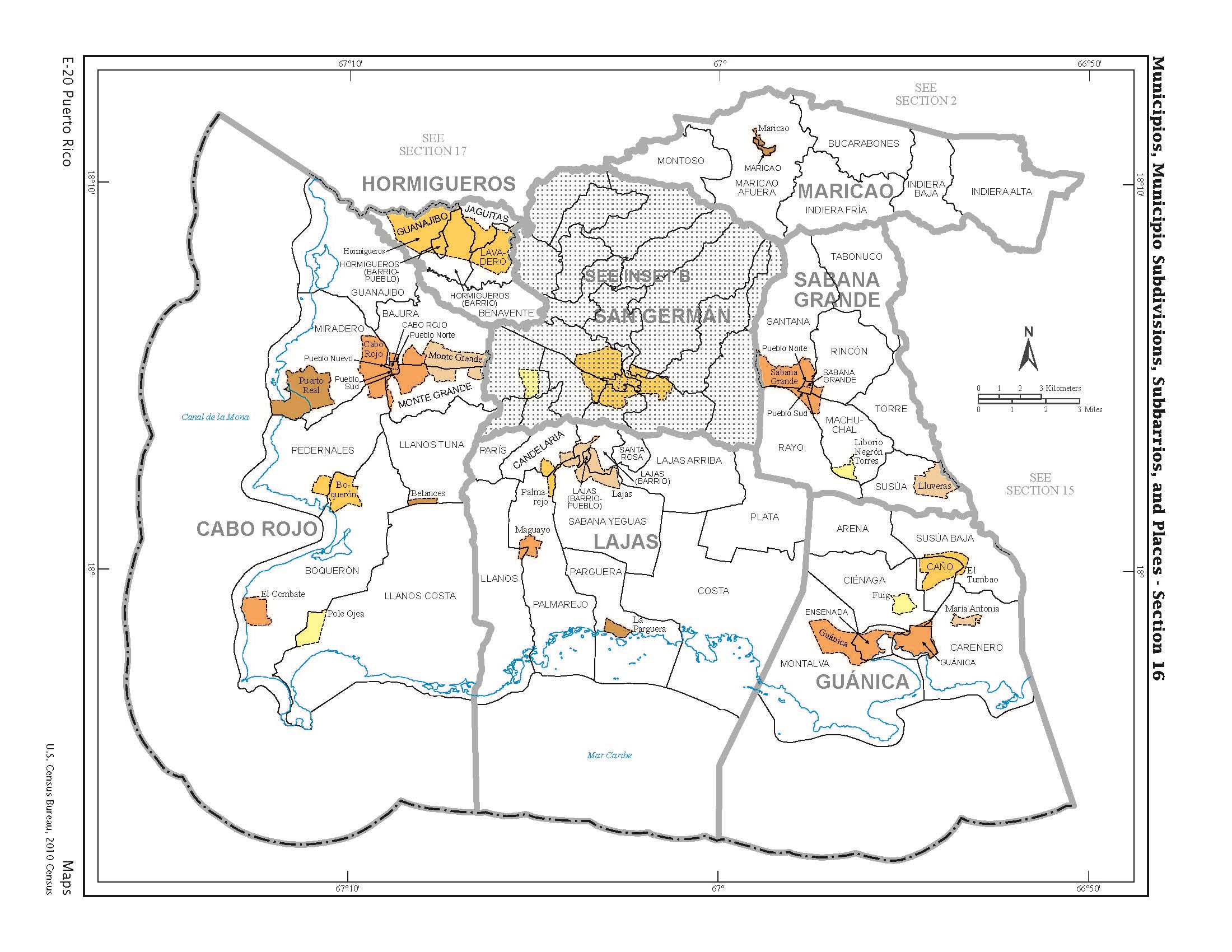
Jagüitas is in the northeastern region of Hormigueros

Barrios (which are, in contemporary times, roughly comparable to minor civil divisions) in turn are further subdivided into smaller local populated place areas/units called sectores (sectors in English). The types of sectores vary from sector to urbanización to reparto to barriada to residencial, among others.

The following sectors are in Jagüitas barrio:

Camino Francisco Cruz, Camino Julio Minguela, Reparto Vista Hermosa, Sector Bracero (from km 2.4 of Carretera 344 onwards), Sector Cuchilla, Sector El Caracol, Sector Fondo del Saco, Sector Los Ayala, Sector Plan Bonito, Sector Quintana, and Urbanización Paseo Los Peregrinos.

== See also ==
- List of communities in Puerto Rico
- List of barrios and sectors of Hormigueros, Puerto Rico
