= Rosario, Mayagüez, Puerto Rico =

Barrio of Puerto Rico

Rosario
- Barrio
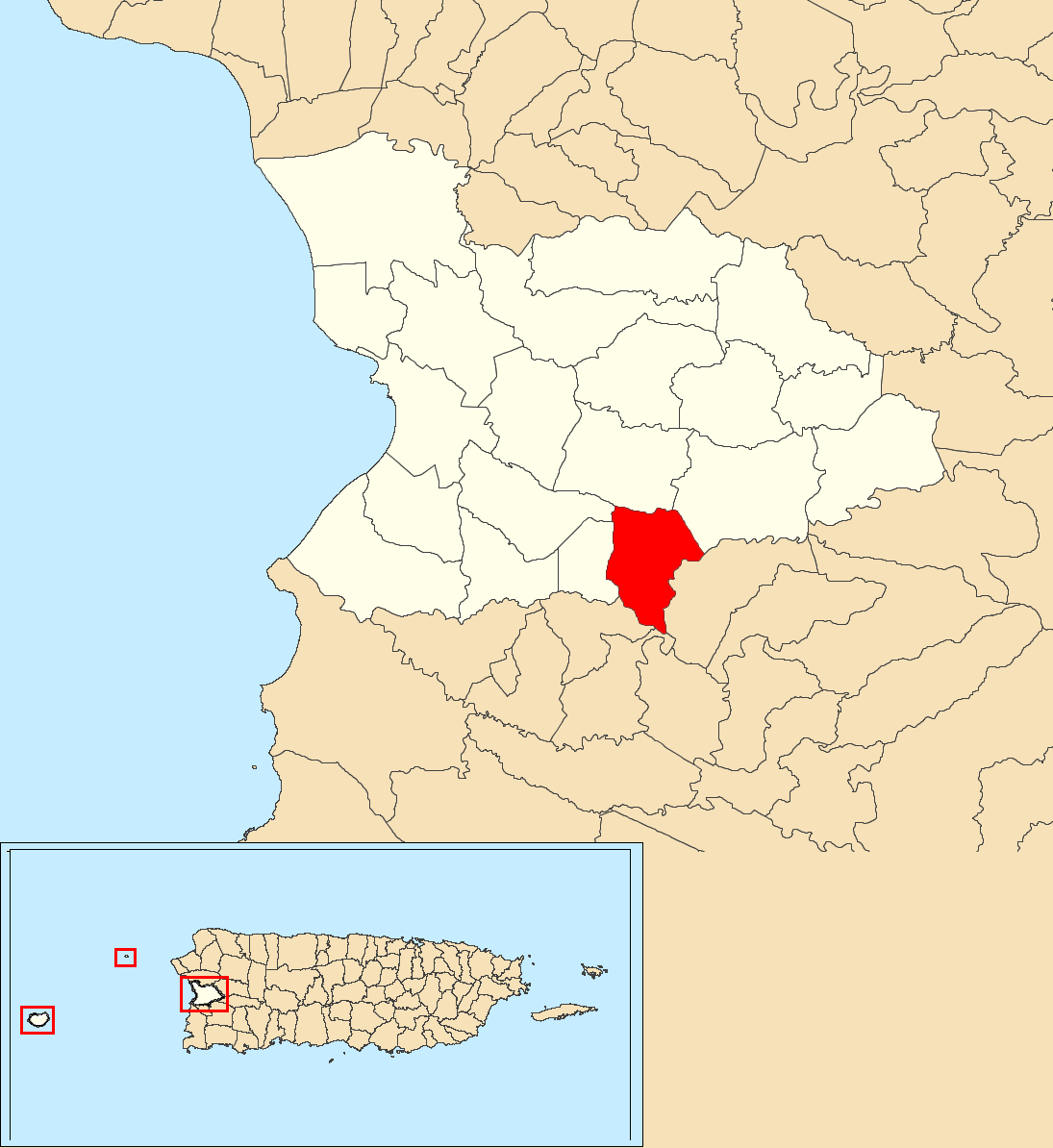
- Location of Rosario within the municipality of Mayagüez shown in red

- Location of Puerto Rico
- Coordinates: 18°10′04″N 67°05′26″W
- Commonwealth: Puerto Rico
- Municipality: Mayagüez

Area
  - Total: 2.01 sq mi (5.2 km^{2})
  - Land: 2.01 sq mi (5.2 km^{2})
  - Water: 0 sq mi (0 km^{2})
- Elevation: 650 ft (200 m)

Population (2020)
  - Total: 1,289
  - Density: 698/sq mi (269/km^{2})
- Source: 2020 Census
- Time zone: UTC−4 (AST)

Rosario is a barrio located between the municipalities of San Germán, Puerto Rico and Mayagüez, Puerto Rico. Its population in 2020 United States Census was 1,289.

== History ==
Rosario was in Spain's gazetteers until Puerto Rico was ceded by Spain in the aftermath of the Spanish–American War under the terms of the Treaty of Paris of 1898 and became an unincorporated territory of the United States. In 1899, the United States Department of War conducted a census of Puerto Rico finding that the population of Rosario barrio was 852.

Historical population
Census	Pop.	Note	%±
1900	852		—
1910	864		1.4%
1920	905		4.7%
1930	900		−0.6%
1940	1,090		21.1%
1950	688		−36.9%
1960	715		3.9%
1970	640		−10.5%
1980	753		17.7%
1990	1,483		96.9%
2000	1,630		9.9%
2010	1,403		−13.9%
2020	1,289		−8.1%
U.S. Decennial Census; 1899 (shown as 1900) 1910-1930; 1930-1950 1980-2000 2010

== Geography ==
Rosario is located in the Cerro Las Mesas, and borders the barrios of Juan Alonso and Limón in Mayagüez, and barrio Montoso of Las Marías, Puerto Rico on the north side. On the south side, it borders the barrios of Duey Bajo, Duey Alto, and Oconuco Bajo in San Germán. To the east, it is also adjacent to the barrio Montoso of Las Marías and Oconuco Alto in San Germán. To the west, it is bordered by the barrios of Quebrada Grande and Malezas, and the barrio Jagüitas in Hormigueros.

Rosario covers an area of approximately 7,672 acres of land, which is equivalent to 11.64 square miles. It is mainly a mountainous region, with rugged topography accounting for 75% of its surface. Another 17% of its surface is classified as moderate, while the remaining 8% is classified as flat terrain. The northern border of el Rosario is formed by the Rosario River, which originates in the mountains of Maricao and divides the western sector of Rosario on the Mayagüez side. To the south, Rosario is bordered by the Nueve Pasos River and the Duey River.

== Sectors ==
Rosario is divided into three main sectors: Rosario Alto in Mayagüez, Rosario Bajo, and Rosario Peñón in San Germán.

== See also ==
- List of communities in Puerto Rico
