= Hormigueros, Puerto Rico =

Town and municipality in Puerto Rico

Hormigueros Municipio Autónomo de Hormigueros
- Town and Municipality
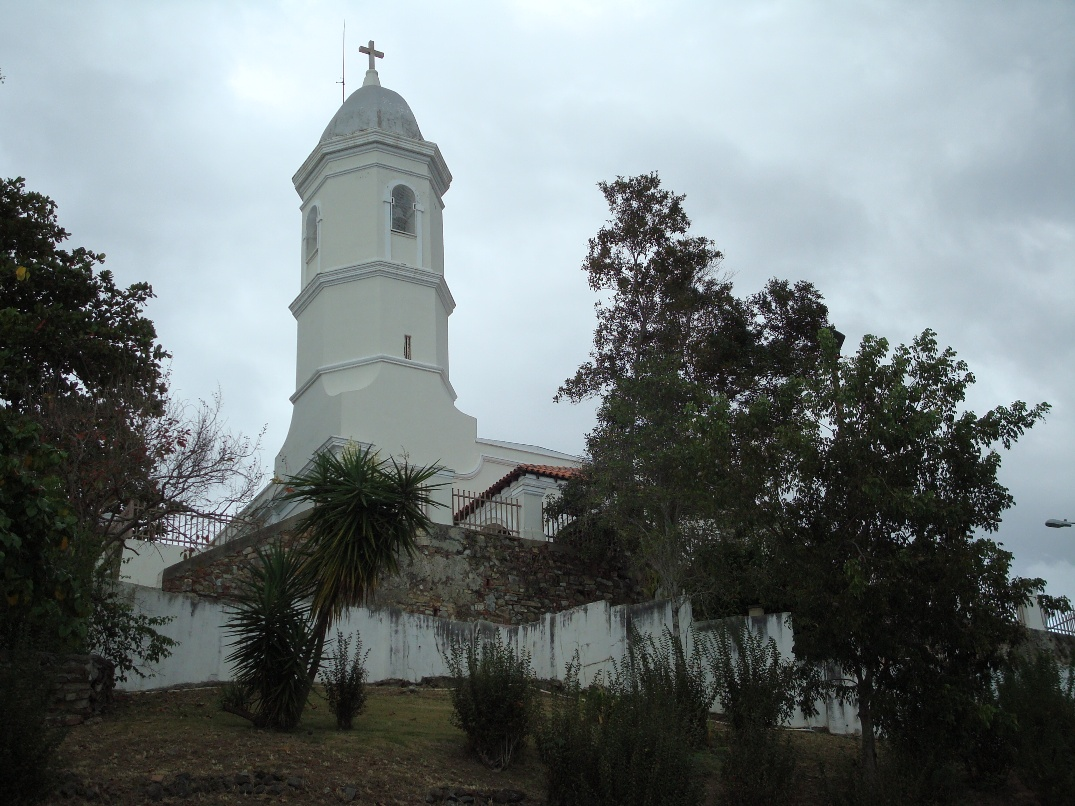
- Basilica of Our Lady of Montserrat

- Flag Coat of arms
- Nicknames: "El Pueblo de Nuestra Señora de la Monserrate", "El Pueblo del Milagro", "Los Peregrinos", "Corazón del Oeste"
- Anthem: "Sobre un verde valle de mi linda Borinquén"
- Map of Puerto Rico highlighting Hormigueros Municipality
- Coordinates: 18°08′23″N 67°07′39″W
- Sovereign state: United States
- Commonwealth: Puerto Rico
- Indigenous settlement: 820 BC
- European settlement: 16th century
- Established: 1692
- Founded: April 1, 1874
- Founder: Giraldo González de la Renta
- Seat: Edificio Modesta Díaz Segarra
- Barrios: 6 barrios: Benavente; Guanajibo; Hormigueros; Hormigueros barrio-pueblo; Jagüitas; Lavadero

Government
  - Mayor: Pedro García Figueroa (Partido Popular Democrático)
  - Senatorial dist.: 4 – Mayagüez
  - Representative dist.: 20

Area
  - Total: 11 sq mi (29 km^{2})
  - Land: 11 sq mi (29 km^{2})
  - Water: 0 sq mi (0 km^{2})

Population (2020)
  - Total: 15,654
  - Estimate (2025): 15,222 ▼
  - Rank: 68th in Puerto Rico
  - Density: 1,400/sq mi (540/km^{2})
- Demonym: Hormiguereños
- Time zone: UTC−4 (AST)
- ZIP Code: 00660
- Area code: 787/939
- Website: www.municipiohormiguerospr.com

Hormigueros (Spanish pronunciation: [oɾmiˈɣeɾos], locally [oɭmiˈɣeɾoʔ]) is a town and municipality of Puerto Rico located in the western region of the island, northeast of Cabo Rojo; northwest of San Germán; and south of Mayagüez. Hormigueros is spread over 5 barrios and Hormigueros Pueblo (the downtown area and the administrative center). It is part of the Mayagüez Metropolitan Statistical Area.

== History ==
The region of what is now Hormigueros belonged to the Guaynia region, located on the southwest portion of Puerto Rico. Archaeological findings have established that there were tribes already settled in the region around 820 BC.

During the Spanish colonization at the beginning of the 16th century, European colonizers settled in the area. A coffin found underground the basilica was tested in laboratories and was dated prior to 1600. Historians also mention the Horomico River as one of the main sources of gold during the rush of the era. In 1692, the settlement that would become the town of Hormigueros was first established as a village of San Germán. It was founded by Giraldo González de la Renta (sometimes spelled Geraldo).

After its initial establishment, Hormigueros belonged to the municipality of San Germán. From 1863 to 1873, residents of Hormigueros made formal petitions to be separated from San Germán and be declared an independent municipality. They were finally granted their independence as a municipality on April 1, 1874, being its first mayor Narciso Oller Serra.

Puerto Rico was ceded by Spain in the aftermath of the Spanish–American War under the terms of the Treaty of Paris of 1898 and became a territory of the United States. In 1899, the United States Department of War conducted a census of Puerto Rico finding that the population of Hormigueros was 3,215.

After the American invasion of 1898, Hormigueros was annexed this time to the town of Mayagüez. The annexation was ordered by Guy V. Henry, but according to Adolfo de Hostos, it was a town's petition. In 1912, they were granted their independence once again, although there were attempts to annex them again during 1928–29.

On September 20, 2017 Hurricane Maria struck Puerto Rico. In minute Hormigueros, 651 residences were affected. The hurricane triggered landslides in Hormigueros with its wind and rainfall.

=== Folklore ===
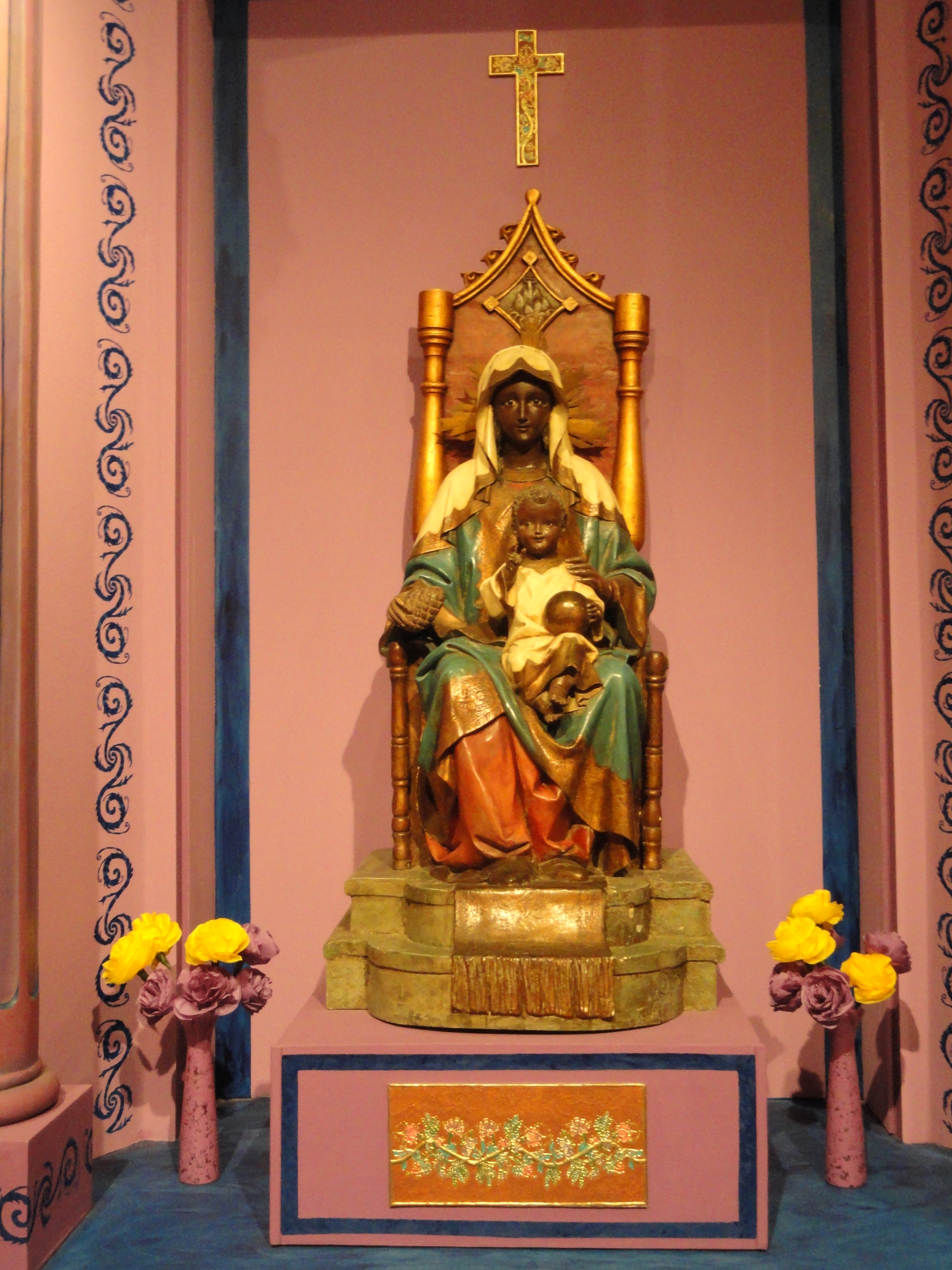
Virgen de La Monserrate at the Museo de las Americas in San Juan, Puerto Rico

There is folklore about the town's founder, an explanation of why the church in the town, Basílica Menor de la Virgen de Monserrate, became so important. The legend has to do with the townspeople aiding Geraldo in finding his eight-year-old daughter, "with eyes as blue as the turquoise skies", when she disappeared. When his daughter was found 15 days later she was unharmed, not hungry, and unafraid and happily explained that a black woman had helped her. Geraldo and the townspeople imagined it was the Virgin of Montserrat and Geraldo said that for having helped his daughter she would be venerated for all ages. Many people heard of the tale and began praying for miracles at the place. Many pilgrimages have been made to the church, even as early as in the 17th century. It had not been the first time Geraldo had experienced a miracle at the location where the church would be built. The first miracle was when a savage bull was going to attack him but when he prayed the bull bent its knees, bowed its head to the ground, and didn't attack. Some versions of the story of the bull that would kill Geraldo state the bull's legs actually broke and thus was unable to charge at him. Since then, many Catholics perform penitence by walking the steps to the church on their knees.

== Geography ==
The municipality of Hormigueros can be divided in three areas: the northern mountainous region that covers one fourth of the town, with hills of relative height; a semi-mountainous region that extends from east to west covering downtown Hormigueros; and the flat, valley region that extends to the south covering 5.6 square miles.

=== Climate ===
The climate conditions of Hormigueros are hot and humid. The average temperature is 72 to 79 °F (22 to 26 °C).

=== Barrios ===
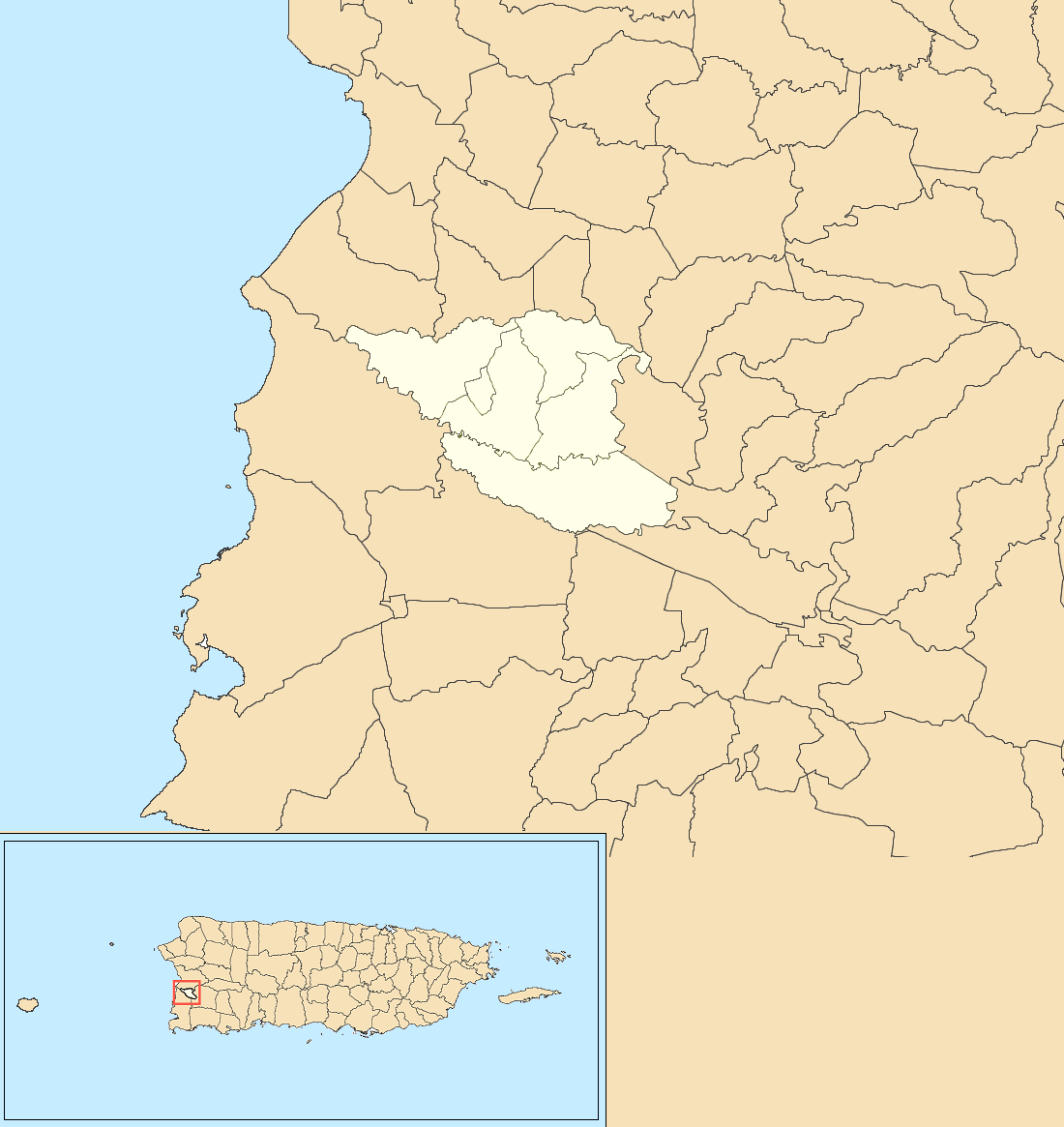
Subdivisions of Hormigueros.

Like all municipalities of Puerto Rico, Hormigueros is subdivided into barrios. The municipal buildings, central square and large Catholic church are located in a small barrio referred to as "el pueblo".

1. Benavente
2. Guanajibo
3. Hormigueros
4. Hormigueros barrio-pueblo
5. Jagüitas
6. Lavadero

These residential areas are located outside Hormigueros downtown:

1. Buenaventura
2. San Romualdo Norte
3. San Romualdo Sur
4. Valle Hermoso Norte
5. Valle Hermoso Sur

=== Sectors ===
Barrios (which are like minor civil divisions) are further subdivided into smaller areas called sectores (sectors in English). The types of sectores may vary, from normally sector to urbanización to reparto to barriada to residencial, among others.

=== Special Communities ===
Comunidades Especiales de Puerto Rico (Special Communities of Puerto Rico) are marginalized communities whose citizens are experiencing a certain amount of social exclusion. A map shows these communities occur in nearly every municipality of the commonwealth. Of the 742 places that were on the list in 2014, the following barrios, communities, sectors, or neighborhoods were in Hormigueros: Sector El Hoyo in Jagüitas, Lavadero, Salsipuedes and San Romualdo.

== Culture ==
=== Festivals and events ===
Hormigueros celebrates its patron saint festival in September. The Fiestas Patronales Virgen de la Monserrate is a religious and cultural celebration that generally features parades, games, artisans, amusement rides, regional food, and live entertainment.

Other festivals and events celebrated in Hormigueros include:

- Three Kings' Day Festival – January
- Evening of poetry and music dedicated to love and friendship – February
- Cultural Meet – March
- Town Anniversary – April
- Celebration honoring Ruiz Belvis – May
- Evening of poetry and music dedicated to mothers – May
- Evening of poetry and music dedicated to fathers – June
- Youth Festival – July
- Patron Saint's Festival queen selection – August
- Segundo Ruiz Belvis Marathon – September
- Puerto Rican Culture Day – November
- Lighting of the Christmas tree – The first Saturday after Thanksgiving
- Caroling (Aguinaldos) – December

== Tourism ==
To stimulate local tourism, the Puerto Rico Tourism Company launched the Voy Turistiendo ("I'm Touring") campaign, with a passport book and website. The Hormigueros page lists Basílica Menor de La Virgen de Monserrate, Casa de los Pelegrinos, and restaurants in Hormigueros, as places of interest.

Despite its small size, Hormigueros does have several attractions for visitors including:

- Birán Recreational Farm
- Central Eureka (Eureka Sugar Refinery)
- Basilica Menor de la Virgen de Monserrate

== Economy ==
The economy of Hormigueros is still developing. In the 1980s and 90s Allergan, Inc. had a subsidiary established in town boosting the economic development of Hormigueros. However, after Allergan left no other private industry has opened operations in the municipality. On the other hand, Hormigueros does provide abundant land, talent and accessibility for an economic development and expansion. Not far away there are two regional airports: Eugenio María de Hostos Airport at Mayagüez and Mercedita Airport at Ponce. In addition, there is the Rafael Hernández International Airport at Aguadilla. All three airports lie within 30 miles approximately.

== Demographics ==
Historical population
Census	Pop.	Note	%±
1900	3,215		—
1910	3,887		20.9%
1920	4,584		17.9%
1930	4,872		6.3%
1940	6,098		25.2%
1950	6,916		13.4%
1960	7,153		3.4%
1970	10,827		51.4%
1980	14,030		29.6%
1990	15,212		8.4%
2000	16,614		9.2%
2010	17,250		3.8%
2020	15,654		−9.3%
2025 (est.)	15,222	▼	−2.8%
U.S. Decennial Census; 1899 (shown as 1900) 1910–1930; 1930–1950 1960–2000 2010 2020

Race – Hormigueros, Puerto Rico – 2000 Census
Race	Population	% of Total
White	14,283	86.0%
Black/African American	811	4.9%
American Indian and Alaska Native	31	0.2%
Asian	21	0.1%
Native Hawaiian/Pacific Islander	4	0.0%
Some other race	1,063	6.4%
Two or more races	401	2.4%

Hormigueros is one of the least populated municipalities. The population, according to the 2000 census, was 16,614 with a population density of 1,510.3 people per square mile (580.9/km^{2}). Since the 1950s, the population has more than doubled.

Statistics taken from the 2000 census shows that 86.0% of Hormiguereños self-identify as Spanish or white origin, 4.9% as black, 0.2% as indigenous or other.

== Government ==
The city belongs to the Puerto Rico Senatorial district IV, which is represented by two senators. In 2012, Gilberto Rodríguez and María Teresa González were elected as district senators.

== Symbols ==
The municipio has an official flag and coat of arms.

=== Flag ===
The town's flag is based on the towns shield. It consists of a blue cloth with a horizontal white rhombus. Superposed on the white rhombus is another blue rhombus with a white globe outlined in blue with a cross. The globe with the cross symbolises royalty and represents Christ's domain over the world. This symbol is a traditional attribute to the Virgin of Montserrat.

=== Coat of arms ===
The town's shield is formed by a blue rhombus, with silver-plated edge. On the blue bottom there's a green hill which is a representation of Our Lady of Monserrate de Hormigueros Sanctuary, with its silver stairway. The border has symmetrical black dots, on guard. On the top of the shield resides a crown formed by a wall, with three towers that have blue doors and windows. The joints of the stones are filled with blue lines. The shield is surrounded by two chains that begin at the crown and finish under the bottom part of the shield with the last links broken.

=== Name ===
The name of Hormigueros means "anthill" in English. The town possibly derives its name from three concepts. The first one refers to the crowds that gathered at the Basilica Menor on September 8 to honor the Virgin of Montserrat. The second refers to the topographic formation of the town which consists of countless hills resembling "anthills" or mogotes, reason why it was called "Valle del Hormiguero" or "Anthill Valley". Third, it is possible that the name was originated from a Taíno word: Horomico, which means "río de oro" or "river of gold" due to the importance of the rivers in the area during the gold rush of the Spanish colonization.

== Education ==
Hormigueros boasts several public and private schools within its territory. Public education is handled by the Puerto Rico Department of Education, specifically the Mayaguez Local Educational Agency (LEA).

The local schools are:

Elementary schools

- Escuela Elemental Nueva

Middle schools

- Ramon Rodríguez Diaz

High schools

- Segundo Ruiz Belvis

Second unit (elementary and middle)

- Alfredo Dorrington Farinacci

=== Higher education ===
At the same time, most of the population (21–35) has either a bachelor or a higher degree, making the town one of the most talented ones in the Island of Puerto Rico.

== Transportation ==
Puerto Rico Highway 2 provides access to Hormigueros from the nearby city of Mayagüez, or from Ponce. The rest of the roads in the town are mostly rural.

It has a public transportation system consisting of public cars. Taxis are also available around the town.

There are 16 bridges in Hormigueros.

== See also ==
- List of Puerto Ricans
- History of Puerto Rico
- National Register of Historic Places listings in Hormigueros, Puerto Rico
- Did you know-Puerto Rico?
- Latin American miracles
