= Giraldo González de la Renta =

Founder of Hormigueros, a town in Puerto Rico

Giraldo González de la Renta was a farmer that owned a large amount of land in the southwest region of Puerto Rico, close to where today is the town of Hormigueros, which he founded in 1874.
