= Rosario Peñón =

Barrio of San Germán, Puerto Rico

- Barrio
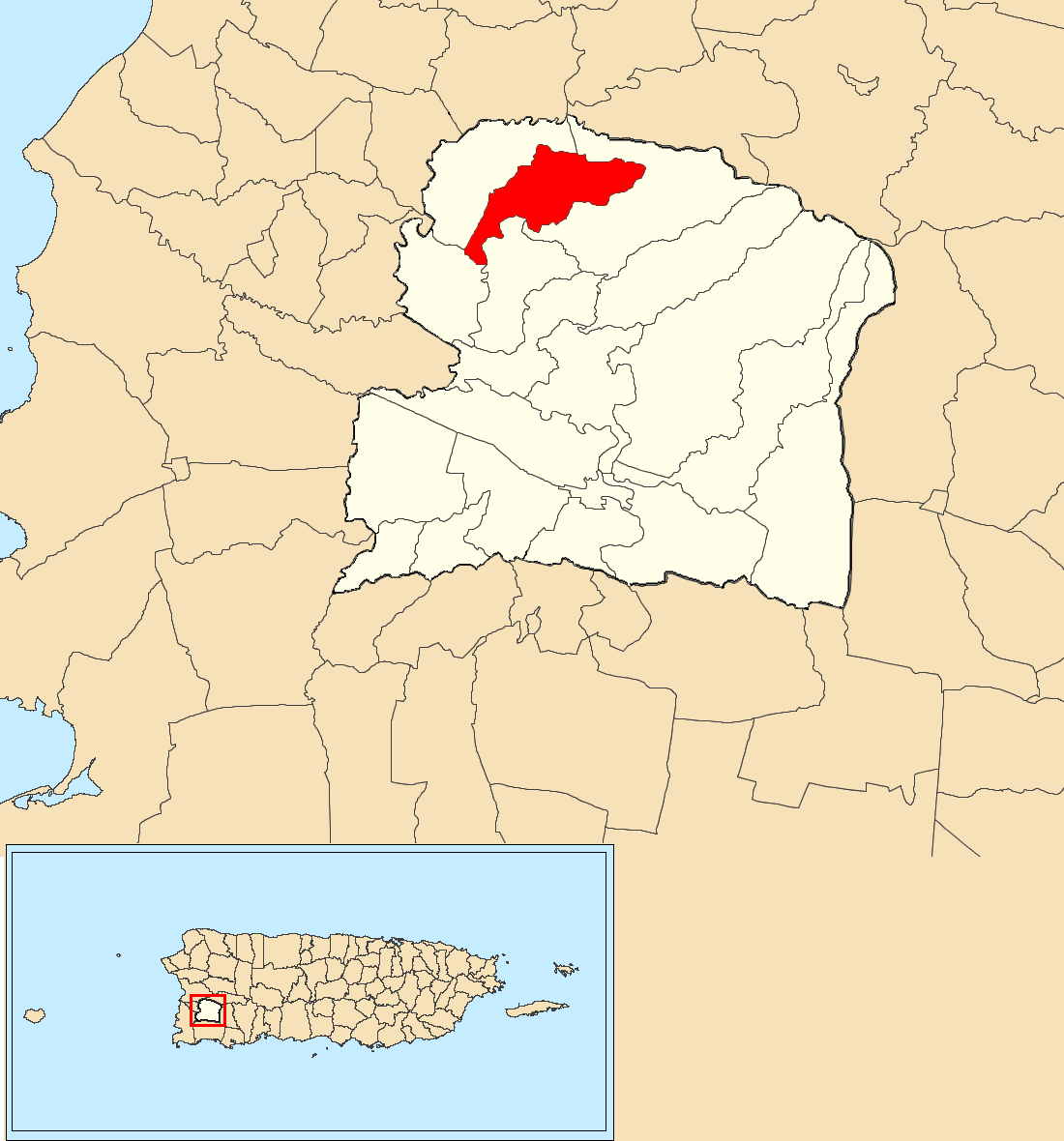
- Location of Rosario Peñon within the municipality of San Germán shown in red

- Location of Puerto Rico
- Coordinates: 18°09′18″N 67°03′18″W
- Commonwealth: Puerto Rico
- Municipality: San Germán

Area
  - Total: 2.19 sq mi (5.7 km^{2})
  - Land: 2.19 sq mi (5.7 km^{2})
  - Water: 0 sq mi (0 km^{2})
- Elevation: 600 ft (180 m)

Population (2010)
  - Total: 805
  - Density: 367.6/sq mi (141.9/km^{2})
- Source: 2010 Census
- Time zone: UTC−4 (AST)

Rosario Peñón is a barrio in the municipality of San Germán, Puerto Rico. Its population in 2010 was 805.

== History ==
Rosario Peñón was in Spain's gazetteers until Puerto Rico was ceded by Spain in the aftermath of the Spanish–American War under the terms of the Treaty of Paris of 1898 and became an unincorporated territory of the United States. In 1899, the United States Department of War conducted a census of Puerto Rico finding that the combined population of Rosario Peñon and Duey Alto barrios was 1,100.

Historical population
Census	Pop.	Note	%±
1910	595		—
1920	724		21.7%
1930	553		−23.6%
1940	558		0.9%
1950	509		−8.8%
1960	405		−20.4%
1970	395		−2.5%
1980	314		−20.5%
1990	344		9.6%
2000	725		110.8%
2010	805		11.0%
U.S. Decennial Census; 1900 (N/A) 1910-1930; 1930-1950 1980-2000 2010

== See also ==
- List of communities in Puerto Rico
