= Lavadero =

Barrio of Hormigueros, Puerto Rico

- Barrio
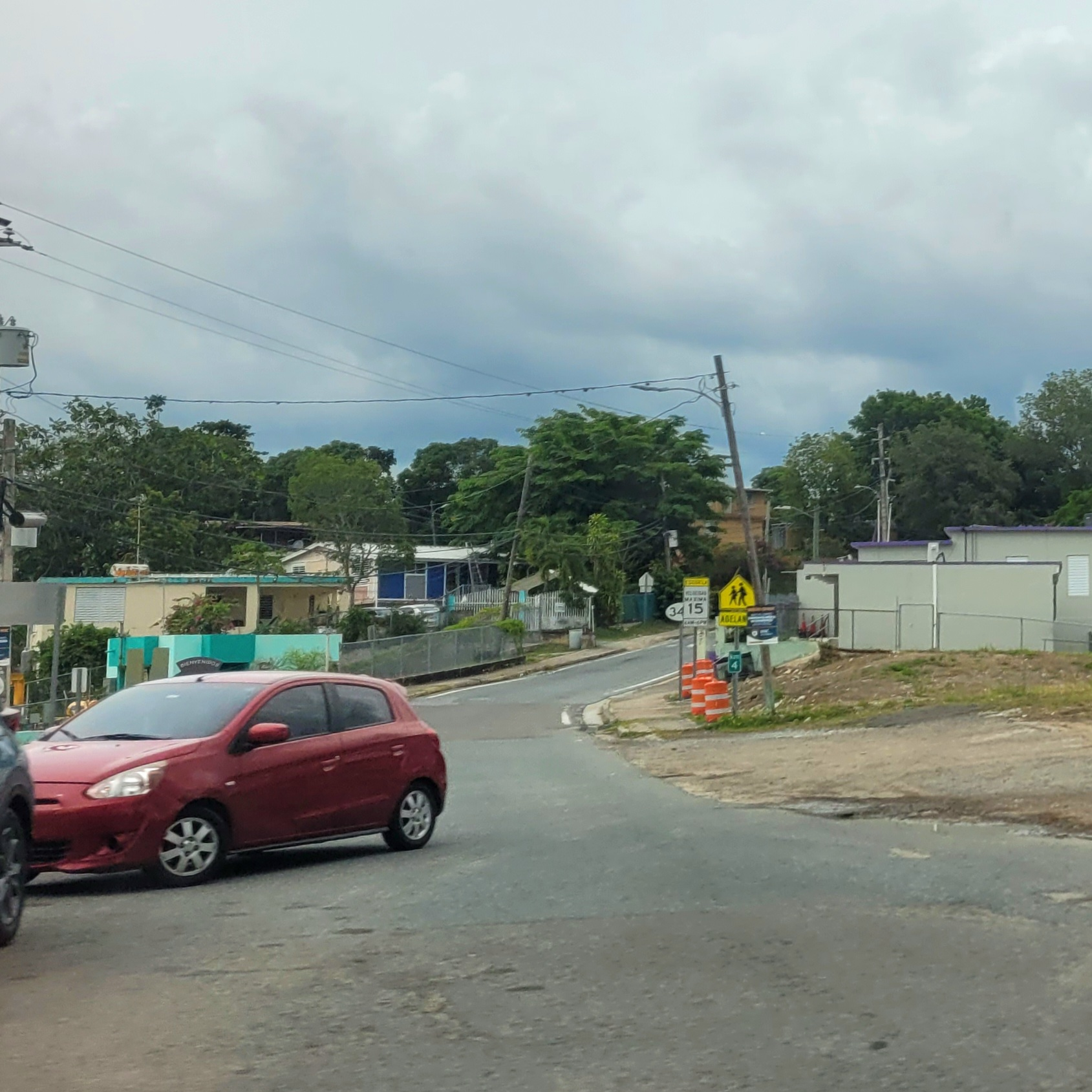
- Puerto Rico Highway 345 in Lavadero

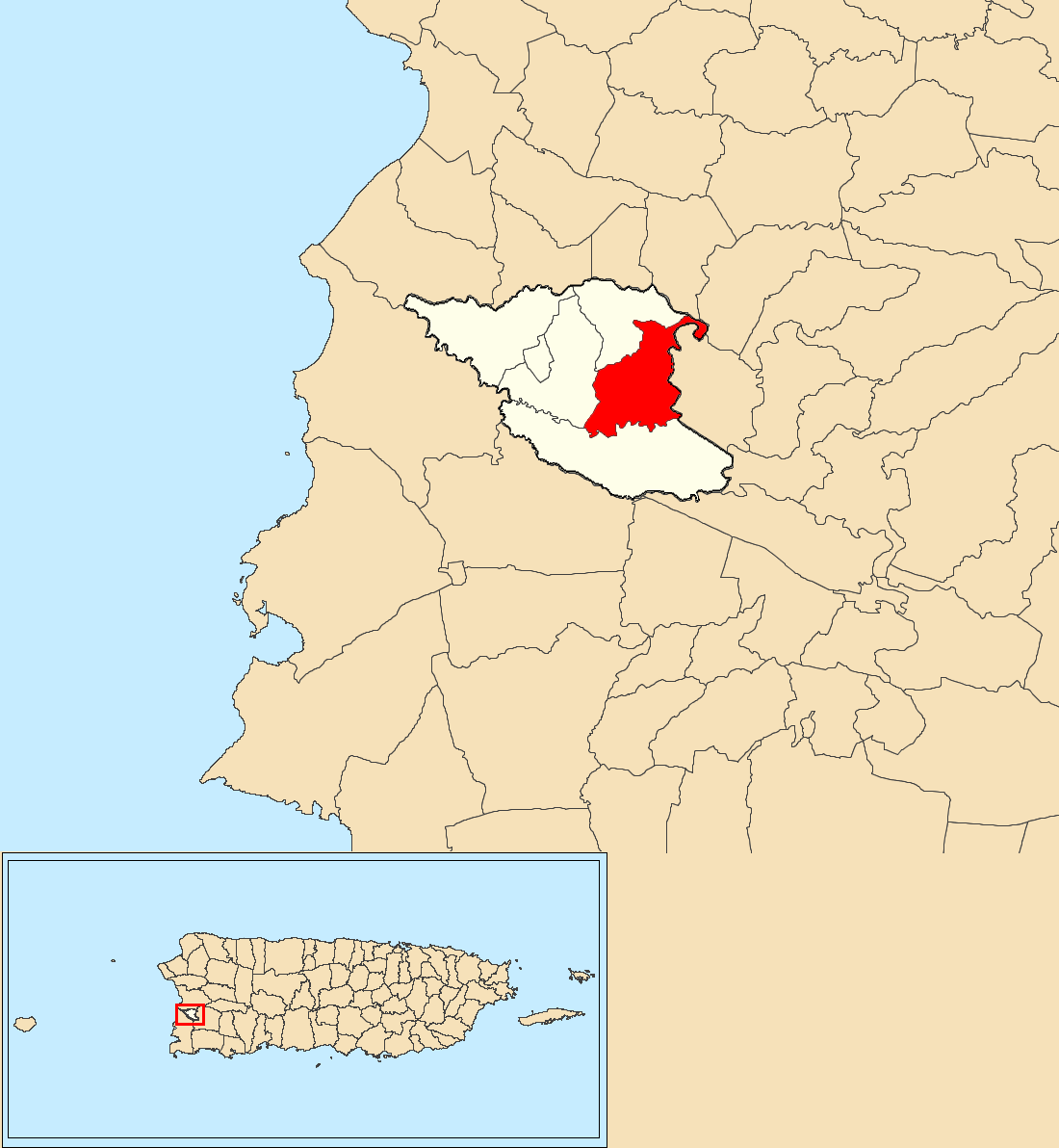
- Location of Lavadero within the municipality of Hormigueros shown in red

- Location of Puerto Rico
- Coordinates: 18°08′04″N 67°06′03″W
- Commonwealth: Puerto Rico
- Municipality: Hormigueros

Area
  - Total: 1.96 sq mi (5.1 km^{2})
  - Land: 1.96 sq mi (5.1 km^{2})
  - Water: 0 sq mi (0 km^{2})
- Elevation: 131 ft (40 m)

Population (2010)
  - Total: 4,305
  - Density: 2,207.7/sq mi (852.4/km^{2})
- Source: 2010 Census
- Time zone: UTC−4 (AST)
- Zip code: 00660

Lavadero is a barrio in the municipality of Hormigueros, Puerto Rico. Its population in 2010 was 4,305.

== History ==
Lavadero was in Spain's gazetteers until Puerto Rico was ceded by Spain in the aftermath of the Spanish–American War under the terms of the Treaty of Paris of 1898 and became an unincorporated territory of the United States. In 1899, the United States Department of War conducted a census of Puerto Rico finding that the combined population of Lavadero and Benavente barrios was 1,047.

Historical population
Census	Pop.	Note	%±
1910	848		—
1920	987		16.4%
1930	940		−4.8%
1940	1,191		26.7%
1950	1,114		−6.5%
1960	1,436		28.9%
1970	1,613		12.3%
1980	2,299		42.5%
1990	3,016		31.2%
2000	4,092		35.7%
2010	4,305		5.2%
U.S. Decennial Census; 1900 (N/A) 1910-1930; 1930-1950 1980-2000 2010

== Sectors ==
Barrios (which are, in contemporary times, roughly comparable to minor civil divisions) in turn are further subdivided into smaller local populated place areas/units called sectores (sectors in English). The types of sectores may vary, from normally sector to urbanización to reparto to barriada to residencial, among others.

The following sectors are in Lavadero barrio:

Camino Guarema, Camino Los Espolas, Haciendas Constancia, Reparto Brisas de Lavadero, Reparto Loma Linda, Reparto San Gabriel, Sector Campo Alegre, Sector Coloso Medina, Sector El Hoyo, Sector La Loma, Urbanización Jardines de la Casona, Urbanización Paseo La Ceiba, Urbanización San José, and Urbanización Villas de Lavadero.

== See also ==
- List of communities in Puerto Rico
- List of barrios and sectors of Hormigueros, Puerto Rico
