= Hormigueros, Hormigueros, Puerto Rico =

Barrio of Puerto Rico

Hormigueros
- Barrio
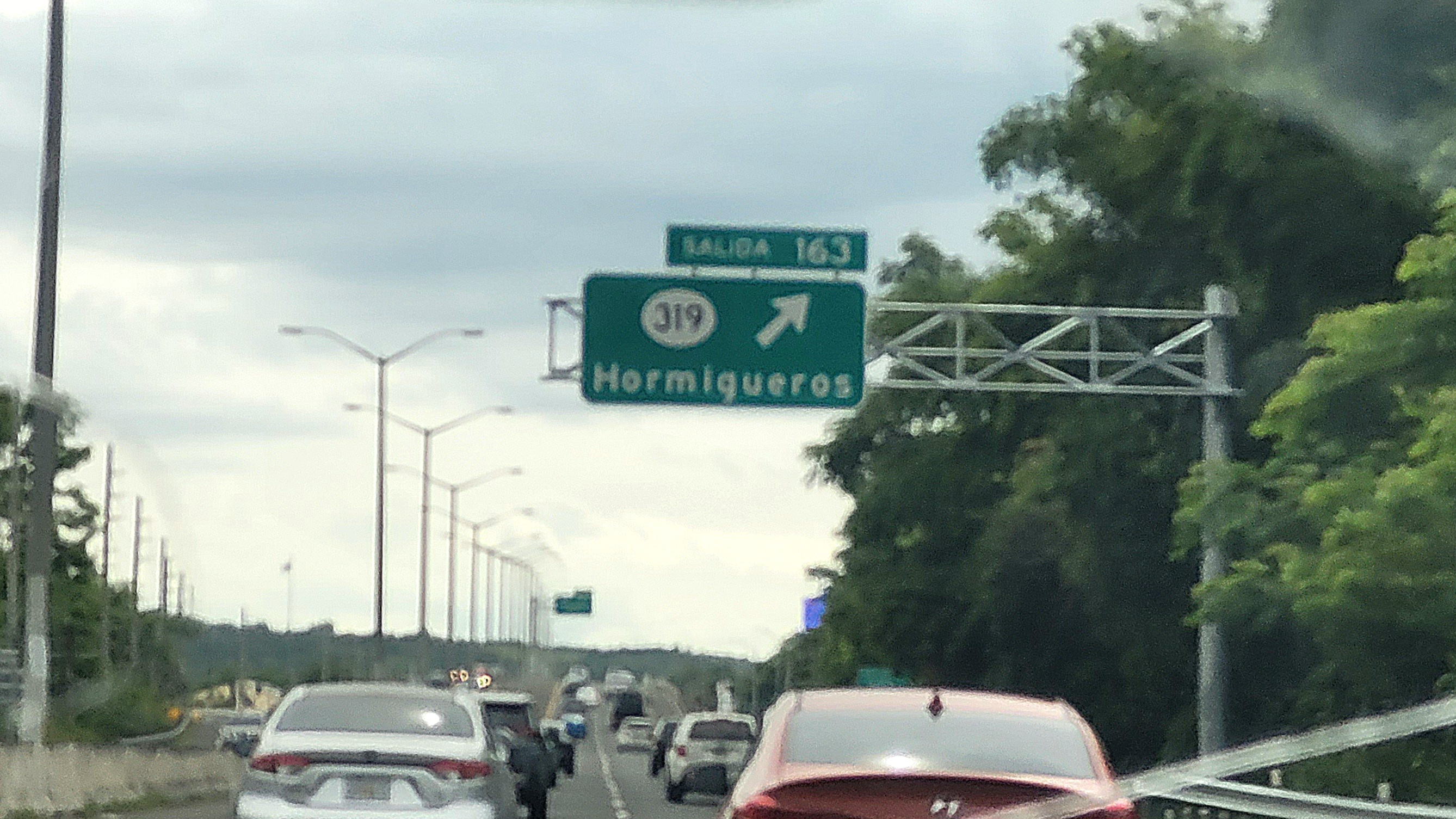
- Puerto Rico Highway 2 in Hormigueros

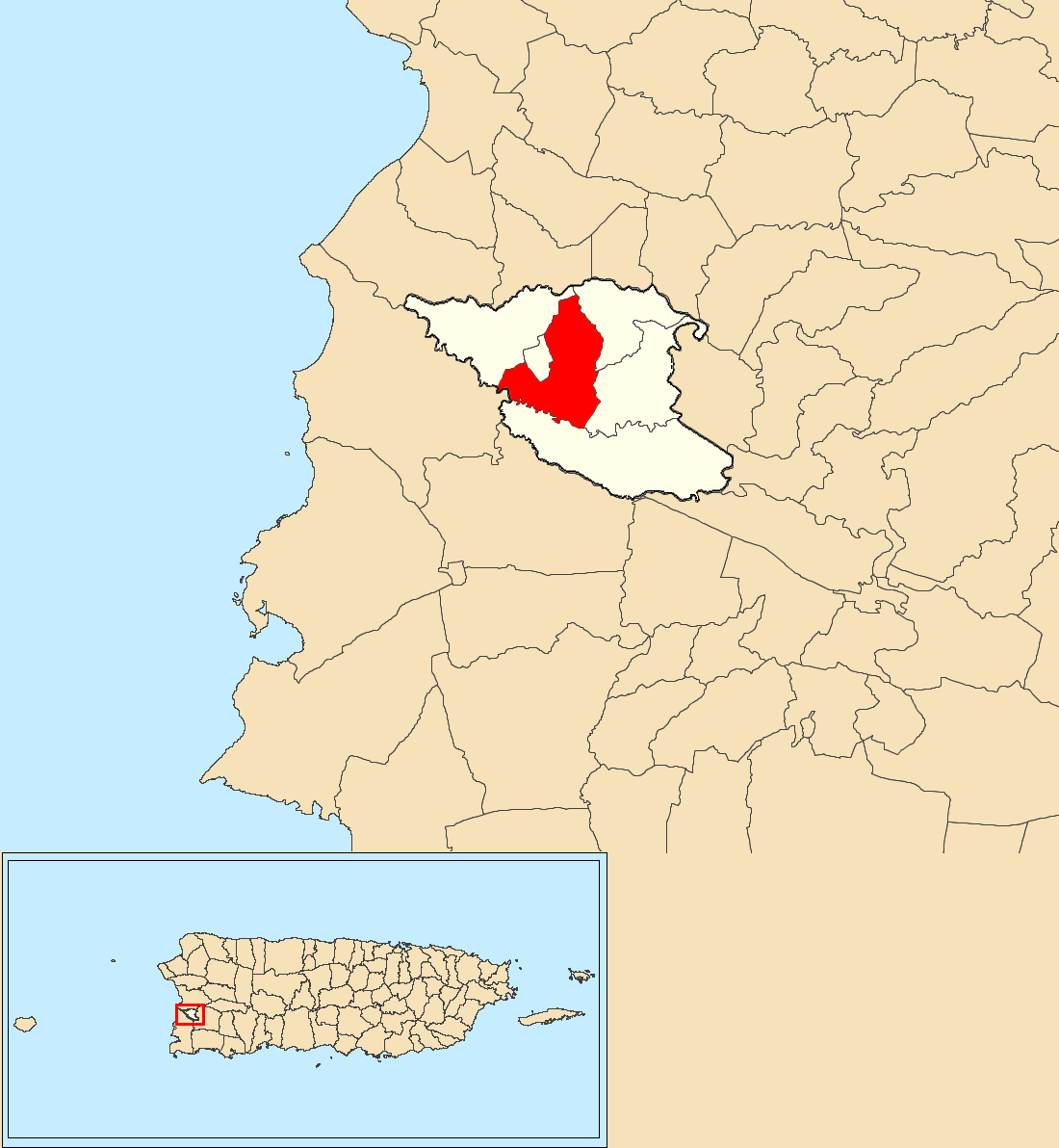
- Location of Hormigueros within the municipality of Hormigueros shown in red

- Location of Puerto Rico
- Coordinates: 18°08′15″N 67°07′13″W
- Commonwealth: Puerto Rico
- Municipality: Hormigueros

Area
  - Total: 1.92 sq mi (5.0 km^{2})
  - Land: 1.92 sq mi (5.0 km^{2})
  - Water: 0 sq mi (0 km^{2})
- Elevation: 52 ft (16 m)

Population (2020)
  - Total: 3,998
- Source: 2020 Census
- Time zone: UTC−4 (AST)
- Zip code: 00660

Hormigueros is a barrio in the municipality of Hormigueros, Puerto Rico. Its population in 2020 was 3,998. There is also a barrio called Hormigueros barrio-pueblo, with the administrative center and seat of this municipality.

== History ==
Hormigueros was in Spain's gazetteers until Puerto Rico was ceded by Spain in the aftermath of the Spanish–American War under the terms of the Treaty of Paris of 1898 and became an unincorporated territory of the United States. In 1899, the United States Department of War conducted a census of Puerto Rico finding that the combined population of Hormigueros and Jagüitas barrios was 965.

Historical population
Census	Pop.	Note	%±
1910	646		—
1920	749		15.9%
1940	1,065		—
1950	818		−23.2%
1960	544		−33.5%
1970	0		−100.0%
1980	2,963		—
1990	3,293		11.1%
2000	3,112		−5.5%
2010	4,358		40.0%
2020	3,998		−8.3%
U.S. Decennial Census; 1900 (N/A) 1910-1930; 1930-1950 1980-2000 2010 2020

== Sectors ==
Barrios (which are, in contemporary times, roughly comparable to minor civil divisions) in turn are further subdivided into smaller local populated place areas/units called sectores (sectors in English). The types of sectores may vary, from normally sector to urbanización to reparto to barriada to residencial, among others.

The following sectors are in Hormigueros barrio:

Apartamentos Balcones de Casa Blanca, Calle Gandules, Carretera 346 (km 2.0), Condominio Monserrate Eldely Apartments, Hormigueros Apartment, Reparto Las Delicias, Sector Cuqui Cabrera, Sector Monte Cristo, Urbanización Colinas del Oeste, Urbanización Estancias del Río, Urbanización Jardines San Francisco, Urbanización La Monserrate, Urbanización Mansiones La Monserrate, Urbanización Verdún, and Urbanización Verdún II.

== See also ==
- List of communities in Puerto Rico
- List of barrios and sectors of Hormigueros, Puerto Rico
