= Latin American miracles =

Historical tradition of belief in miracles in Catholic Latin America

Most of Latin America is predominantly Catholic and miracles have a deep historical tradition in Catholic theology. To some, miracles would be considered fate or a lucky break, but to Catholics "A miracle is a supernaturally (divinely) caused event, an event (ordinarily) different from what would have occurred in the normal ("natural") course of events."

Many Latin American homes pray for Mary’s intercession. On some occasions these requests are granted in the form of miracles or are given as "miraculous gifts".

As Latin America has such a deep rooted belief in Catholic theology, the belief in miracles is still prevalent today. Miracles have been witnessed, in many different forms throughout the world and are one of the mainstays of the Catholic beliefs. Humans have not been able to explain miracles, but firmly believe in them. Latin American Christians pray, worship, and attend church, with the hopes of receiving a blessing or a miracle from God.

== Talismans ==
Milagros is the Spanish word for miracle and in Latin America milagros are small charms, usually in an anatomical shape that "symbolize an afflicted person or body part." In some parts of Latin America people will make pilgrimages to visit the statues of their patron saints and "Leave milagros as tangible symbolic petition or expressions of thanks." Milagros were originally produced for the rich, but are now made out of tin and other base metals for everyone and usually takes the form of "A leg, head, eye, or arms and hearts, feet or hands (Langham, 326)." These icons are believed to hold significant meaning among Catholics because they represent miraculous events.
