= Hormigueros barrio-pueblo =

Historical and administrative center (seat) of Hormigueros, Puerto Rico

Hormigueros barrio-pueblo Pueblo de Hormigueros
- Municipality Seat
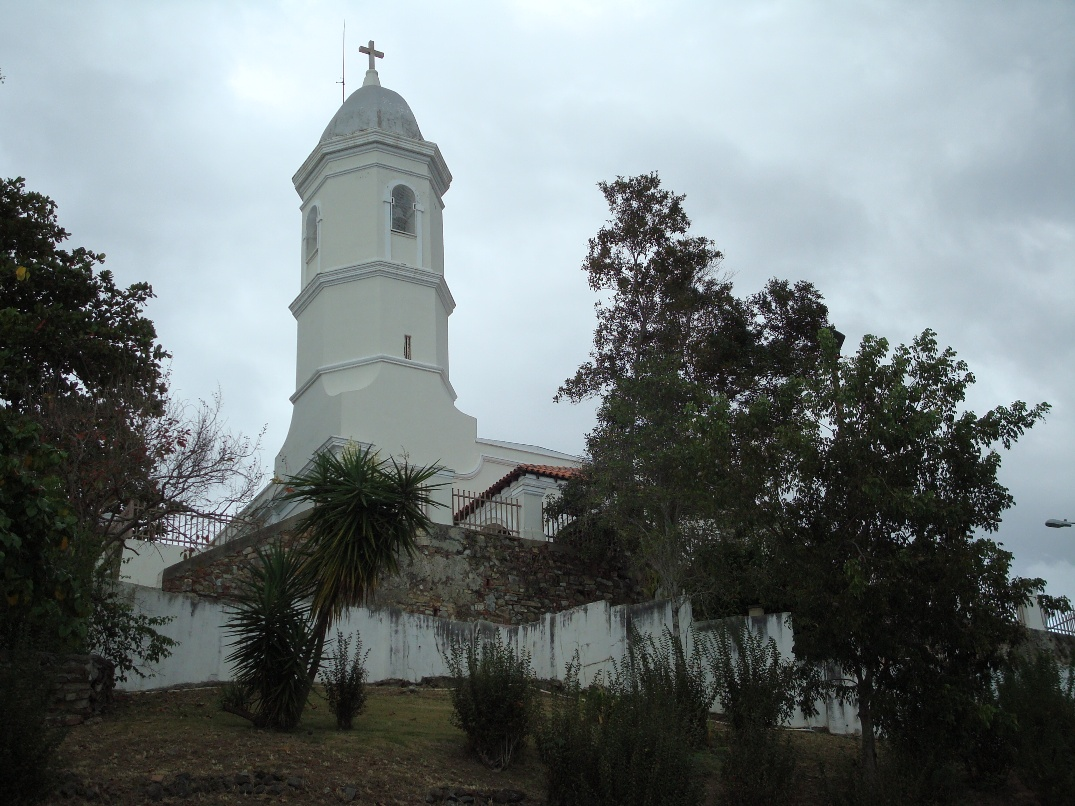
- Basílica Menor de la Virgen de Monserrate

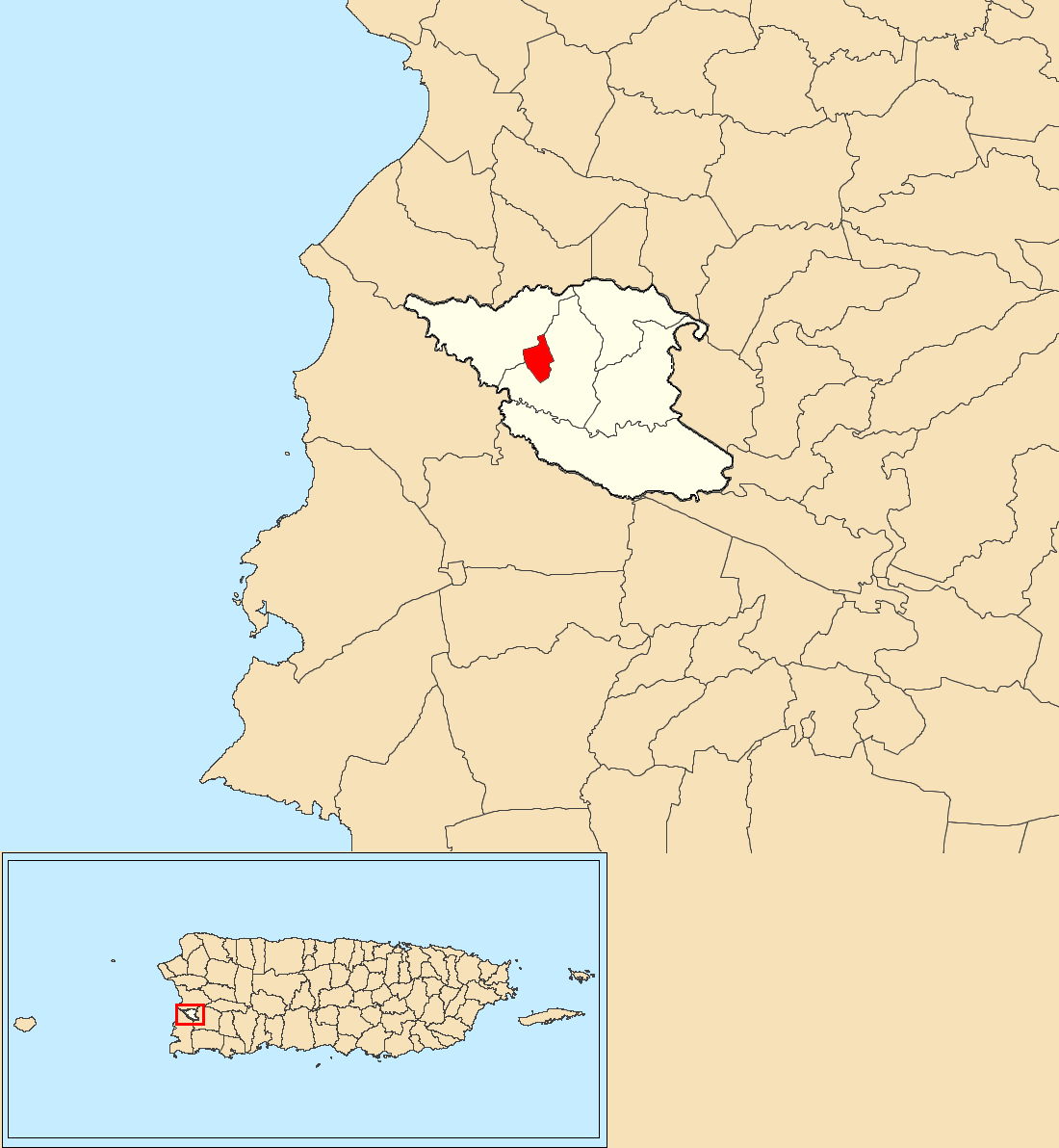
- Location of Hormigueros barrio-pueblo within the municipality of Hormigueros shown in red

- Location of Puerto Rico
- Coordinates: 18°08′23″N 67°07′34″W
- Commonwealth: Puerto Rico
- Municipality: Hormigueros

Area
  - Total: 0.23 sq mi (0.60 km^{2})
  - Land: 0.23 sq mi (0.60 km^{2})
  - Water: 0 sq mi (0 km^{2})
- Elevation: 75 ft (23 m)

Population (2010)
  - Total: 1,204
  - Density: 5,234.8/sq mi (2,021.2/km^{2})
- Source: 2010 Census
- Time zone: UTC−4 (AST)
- Zip code: 00660

Hormigueros barrio-pueblo is a barrio and the administrative center (seat) of Hormigueros, a municipality of Puerto Rico. Its population in 2010 was 1,204. There is also an Hormigueros barrio in this municipality, with a much larger population.

As was customary in Spain, in Puerto Rico, the municipality has a barrio called pueblo which contains a central plaza, the municipal buildings (city hall), and a Catholic church. Fiestas patronales (patron saint festivals) are held in the central plaza every year.

Historical population
Census	Pop.	Note	%±
1910	348		—
1920	538		54.6%
1930	1,412		162.5%
1940	1,051		−25.6%
1950	1,776		69.0%
1960	1,647		−7.3%
1970	0		−100.0%
1980	1,255		—
1990	1,056		−15.9%
2000	1,017		−3.7%
2010	1,204		18.4%
U.S. Decennial Census; 1900 (N/A) 1910-1930; 1930-1950 1980-2000 2010

== The central plaza and its church ==
The central plaza, or square, is a place for official and unofficial recreational events and a place where people can gather and socialize from dusk to dawn. The Laws of the Indies, Spanish law, which regulated life in Puerto Rico in the early 19th century, stated the plaza's purpose was for "the parties" (celebrations, festivities) (Spanish: a propósito para las fiestas), and that the square should be proportionally large enough for the number of neighbors (Spanish: grandeza proporcionada al número de vecinos). These Spanish regulations also stated that the streets nearby should be comfortable portals for passersby, protecting them from the elements: sun and rain.

Located across the central plaza in Hormiqueros barrio-pueblo is the Basílica Menor de la Virgen de Monserrate, a Roman Catholic church.

== History ==
Hormigueros barrio-pueblo was in Spain's gazetteers until Puerto Rico was ceded by Spain in the aftermath of the Spanish–American War under the terms of the Treaty of Paris of 1898 and became an unincorporated territory of the United States. In 1899, the United States Department of War conducted a census of Puerto Rico finding that the combined population of Pueblo and Guanajibo barrios was 1,203.

== Sectors ==
Barrios (which are, in contemporary times, roughly comparable to minor civil divisions) in turn are further subdivided into smaller local populated place areas/units called sectores (sectors in English). The types of sectores may vary, from normally sector to urbanización to reparto to barriada to residencial, among others.

The following sectors are in Hormigueros barrio-pueblo:

Apartamentos Monserrate Court, Camino Waldemar Rivera, Residencial Gabriel Soler, and Sector Los Barros.

== See also ==
- List of communities in Puerto Rico
- List of barrios and sectors of Hormigueros, Puerto Rico
