= Puerto Rico Highway 116 =

Highway in Puerto Rico

Highway 116
- Ruta 116
- Avenida Manuel "Pito" Pagán Ramírez

Route information
- Maintained by Puerto Rico DTPW
- Length: 26.6 km (16.5 mi)
- Existed: 1953–present

Major junctions
- West end: PR-101 in Lajas
- PR-122 in Lajas; PR-315 in Lajas–Sabana Yeguas; PR-304 / PR-305 in Parguera–Costa–Sabana Yeguas; PR-323 in Costa; PR-3116 in Montalva; PR-3116 in Ensenada; PR-4116 in Guánica barrio-pueblo; PR-332 in Ciénaga; PR-333 in Ciénaga; PR-326 in Susúa Baja
- East end: PR-2 in Susúa Baja

Location
- Country: United States
- Territory: Puerto Rico
- Municipalities: Lajas, Guánica

Highway system
- Roads in Puerto Rico; List
← PR-115	→ PR-117
← PR-1111	PR-1116	→ PR-3101
← PR-3108	PR-3116	→ PR-3131
← PR-4111	PR-4116	→ PR-4119

Puerto Rico Highway 116 (PR-116) is a main highway in the southwest region of Puerto Rico, between the municipalities of Guánica and Lajas. This road begins at PR-2 in Susúa Baja and ends at Puerto Rico Highway 101 in Lajas barrio.

== Route description ==
It is the main route to Guánica and Lajas, and grants access to places such as the Dry Forest of Puerto Rico (Bosque Seco), common for its cacti and dry, desert-like climate, and also to beaches like Parguera in Lajas and Playa Santa in Guánica. It is divided, two lane-per-direction in the first 4 kilometers before turning one lane-per direction in the rest of its length. The width of its lanes allows for speed limits above the normal rural roads.

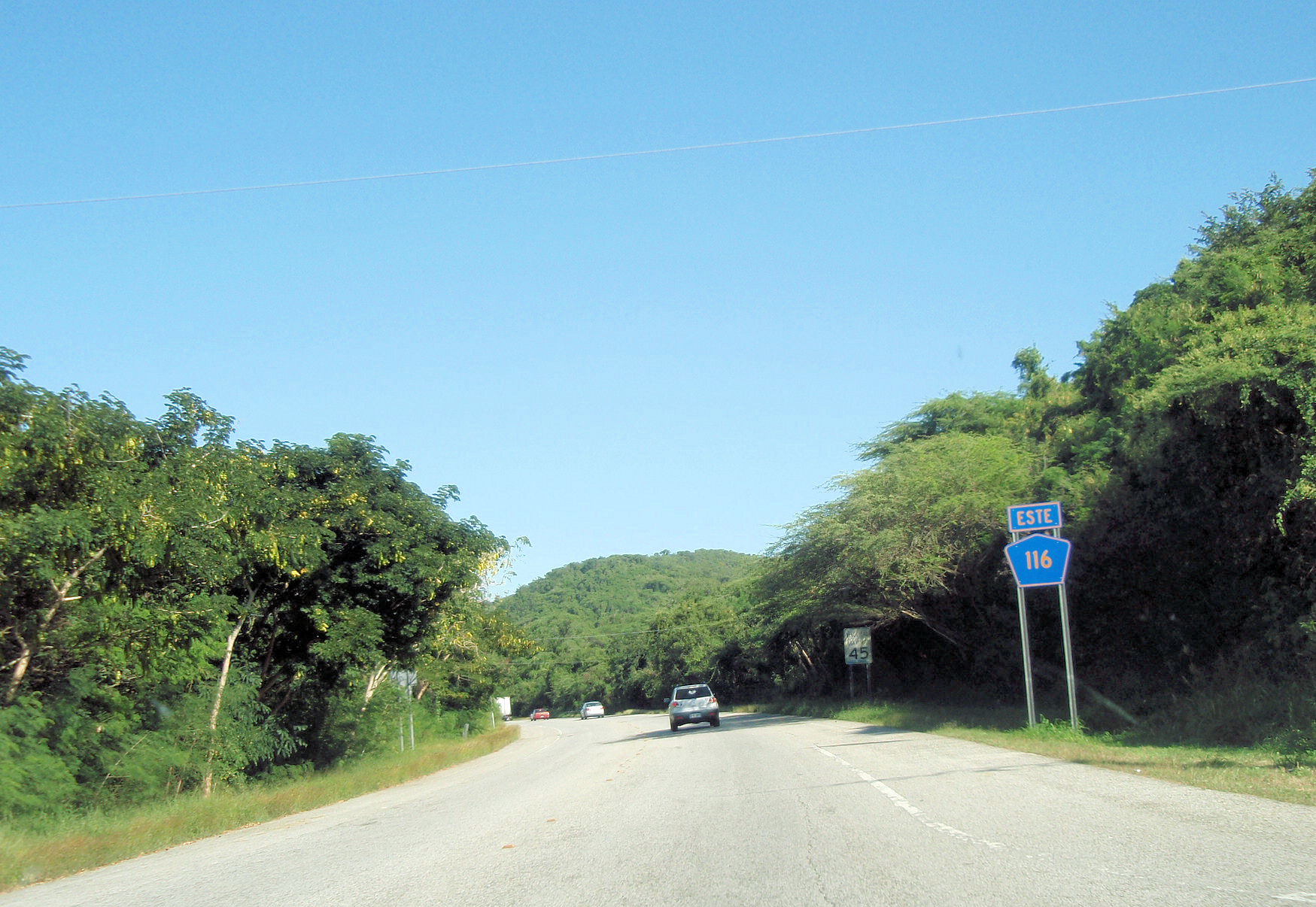
A rural stretch of Puerto Rico Highway 116 in Lajas, looking east

== Major intersections ==
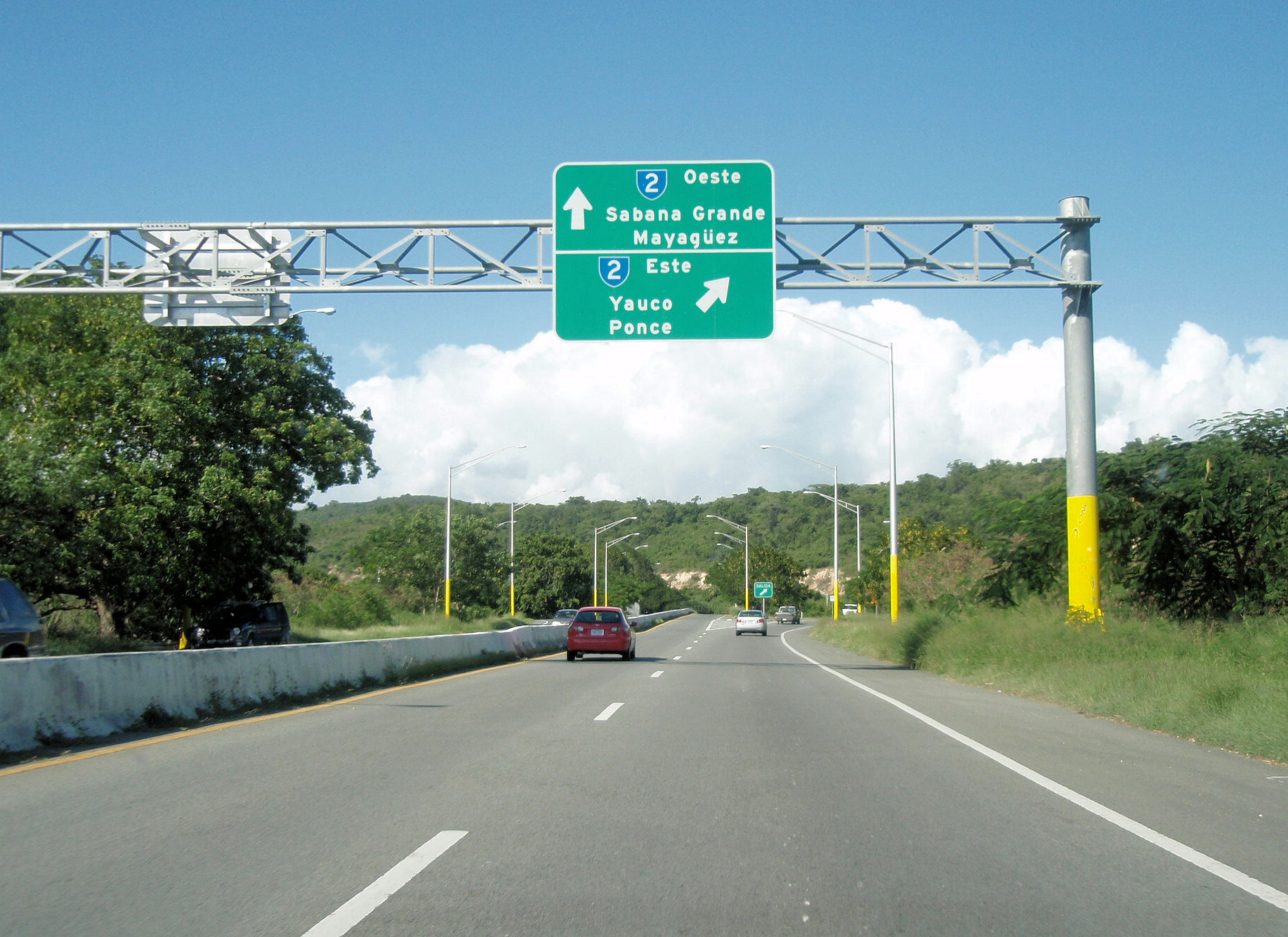
Eastern terminus of PR-116 in Guánica where it meets PR-2

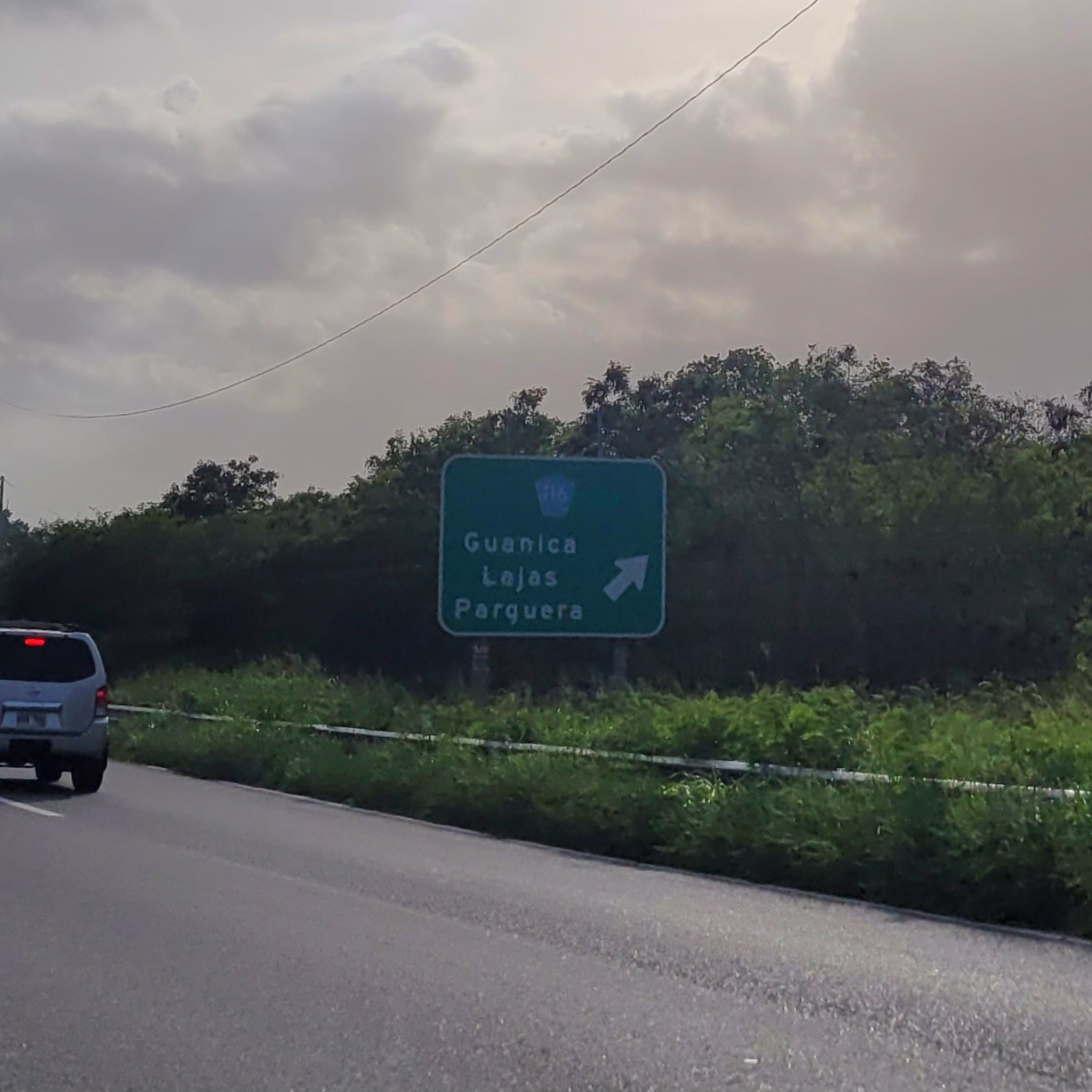
PR-2 west at exit 194 to PR-116 west in Guánica

Municipality	Location	km	mi	Destinations	Notes
Lajas	Lajas	0.0	0.0	PR-101 – Lajas, San Germán	Western terminus of PR-116
Lajas	Lajas	1.0	0.62	PR-122 north (Carretera Harry Luis Pérez Rivera) – San Germán	Seagull intersection
Lajas	Lajas–Sabana Yeguas line	1.5– 1.6	0.93– 0.99	PR-315 to PR-117 – Lajas, Sabana Grande	
Lajas	Sabana Yeguas	2.9	1.8	PR-315 – Sabana Yeguas	
Lajas	Sabana Yeguas–Parguera line	5.5	3.4	PR-305 (Carretera Jorge Alberto "George" Ferrer Asencio) – Parguera	
Lajas	Parguera–Costa– Sabana Yeguas tripoint	6.6	4.1	PR-304 / PR-305 (Carretera Jorge Alberto "George" Ferrer Asencio) – Parguera	
Lajas	Costa	12.7	7.9	PR-323 – Costa	
Guánica	Montalva	17.9	11.1	PR-3116 (Avenida Los Veteranos) – Montalva	
Guánica	Ensenada	20.9	13.0	PR-3116 (Avenida Los Veteranos) – Ensenada	Incomplete trumpet interchange; no eastbound exit
Guánica	Ensenada	21.2	13.2	PR-331 – Ciénaga	
Guánica	Guánica barrio-pueblo	21.6	13.4	PR-4116 – Guánica	
Guánica	Ciénaga	22.1– 22.2	13.7– 13.8	PR-332 – Guánica	
Guánica	Ciénaga	22.5– 22.6	14.0– 14.0	PR-333 (Carretera Janice Montalvo Loyola) – Caña Gorda	
Guánica	Ciénaga–Caño– Carenero tripoint	23.0	14.3	PR-334 – Carenero	
Guánica	Carenero	24.1	15.0	PR-326 (Carretera Agustín "Quino" López Oliveras) – Caño	Former PR-116R
Guánica	Susúa Baja	25.6	15.9	PR-326 (Carretera Agustín "Quino" López Oliveras) – Caño	Former PR-116R
Guánica	Susúa Baja	26.6	16.5	PR-2 (Expreso Roberto Sánchez Vilella) – Yauco, Ponce, Mayagüez	Eastern terminus of PR-116; PR-2 exit 194; trumpet interchange
1.000 mi = 1.609 km; 1.000 km = 0.621 mi: Incomplete access

== Related routes ==
Currently, PR-116 has three branches in its old segments in Guánica and Yauco. Originally they were identified as PR-116R.

=== Puerto Rico Highway 1116 ===
Highway 1116
- Location: Guánica – Yauco
- Length: 4.4 km (2.7 mi)
- Existed: 2015

Puerto Rico Highway 1116 (PR-1116) was the old section of PR-116 between Guánica and Yauco. It extended from PR-116 between Caño and Carenero barrios to PR-121 in Susúa Baja. In 2015, this highway was designated as Avenida Agustín "Quino" López Oliveras and renumbered to PR-326.

Municipality	Location	km	mi	Destinations	Notes
Guánica	Carenero	0.0	0.0	PR-116 (Avenida Manuel "Pito" Pagán Ramírez) – Guánica, Lajas	Southern terminus of PR-1116
Guánica	Susúa Baja	1.6	0.99	PR-116 (Avenida Manuel "Pito" Pagán Ramírez) – Yauco	
Guánica	Susúa Baja	2.3	1.4	PR-389 – La Joya	
Guánica	Susúa Baja	2.9– 3.0	1.8– 1.9	PR-3332 – Arena	
Yauco	Susúa Baja	4.4	2.7	PR-121 – Yauco, Sabana Grande	Northern terminus of PR-1116
1.000 mi = 1.609 km; 1.000 km = 0.621 mi

=== Puerto Rico Highway 3116 ===
Highway 3116
- Location: Guánica
- Length: 3.4 km (2.1 mi)

Puerto Rico Highway 3116 (PR-3116) is an old segment of PR-116 that provides access to Ensenada. The entire route is located in Guánica.

Location	km	mi	Destinations	Notes
Montalva	0.0	0.0	PR-116 (Avenida Manuel "Pito" Pagán Ramírez) – Lajas	Western terminus of PR-3116
Montalva–Ensenada line	1.1	0.68	PR-324 – Montalva	
Ensenada	1.9	1.2	PR-325 – Playa Santa	
Ensenada	3.4	2.1	PR-116 (Avenida Manuel "Pito" Pagán Ramírez) – Yauco	Eastern terminus of PR-3116; incomplete trumpet interchange; no exit ramp from PR-116 eastbound
1.000 mi = 1.609 km; 1.000 km = 0.621 mi: Incomplete access

=== Puerto Rico Highway 4116 ===
Highway 4116
- Location: Guánica
- Length: 1.5 km (0.93 mi)

Puerto Rico Highway 4116 (PR-4116) is the original route of PR-116 through downtown Guánica. This road can be seen as Puerto Rico 116 Business. The entire route is located in Guánica.

Location	km	mi	Destinations	Notes
Guánica barrio-pueblo	0.0	0.0	PR-116 (Avenida Manuel "Pito" Pagán Ramírez) – Lajas	Western terminus of PR-4116
Guánica barrio-pueblo–Carenero– Ciénaga tripoint	1.0– 1.1	0.62– 0.68	PR-332 – Ciénaga	
Carenero	1.5	0.93	PR-333 (Carretera Janice Montalvo Loyola) to PR-116 (Avenida Manuel "Pito" Pagán Ramírez) – Yauco, Caña Gorda	Eastern terminus of PR-4116; Guánica State Forest
1.000 mi = 1.609 km; 1.000 km = 0.621 mi

== See also ==
- 1953 Puerto Rico highway renumbering
