= Puerto Rico Highway 303 =

Highway in Puerto Rico

Highway 303
- Ruta 303
- Ruta Extraterrestre

Route information
- Maintained by Puerto Rico DTPW
- Length: 14.7 km (9.1 mi)

Major junctions
- West end: PR-301 in Boquerón
- PR-302 in Llanos Costa; PR-305 in Palmarejo–Parguera–Sabana Yeguas
- East end: PR-101 in Palmarejo

Location
- Country: United States
- Territory: Puerto Rico
- Municipalities: Cabo Rojo, Lajas

Highway system
- Roads in Puerto Rico; List
← PR-301	→ PR-326

Puerto Rico Highway 303 (PR-303) is a rural road stretching between the municipalities of Cabo Rojo and Lajas in Puerto Rico. It begins in PR-301, in southeastern Boquerón, Cabo Rojo, passing south of the Sierra Bermeja before leading northeast, where it passes PR-305 and ending at a junction with PR-101. The stretch of the road spanning the southern border of Sierra Bermeja is popularly known as the Puerto Rico Alien Route (Spanish: Ruta Extraterrestre) due to the number of UFO reports associated with the area it crosses.

== Route description ==
The area around Sierra Bermeja, particularly along the southern edge of the mountain range, has been associated with UFOs in Puerto Rican folklore and pop culture since the second half of the 20th century. A green direction sign identifying the route as the Ruta Extraterrestre was installed in the early 2000s. However, it was removed when the Puerto Rico Department of Transportation and Public Works rejected officially recognizing such designation on a state level. On April 9, 2005, Marcos "Turín" Irizarry Pagán, major of Lajas, proclaimed the section of PR-303 spanning the municipality between its municipal boundary with Cabo Rojo and the route's junction with PR-305. Nevertheless, the route is now promoted as a tourist attraction by the municipality of Lajas and by local businesses.

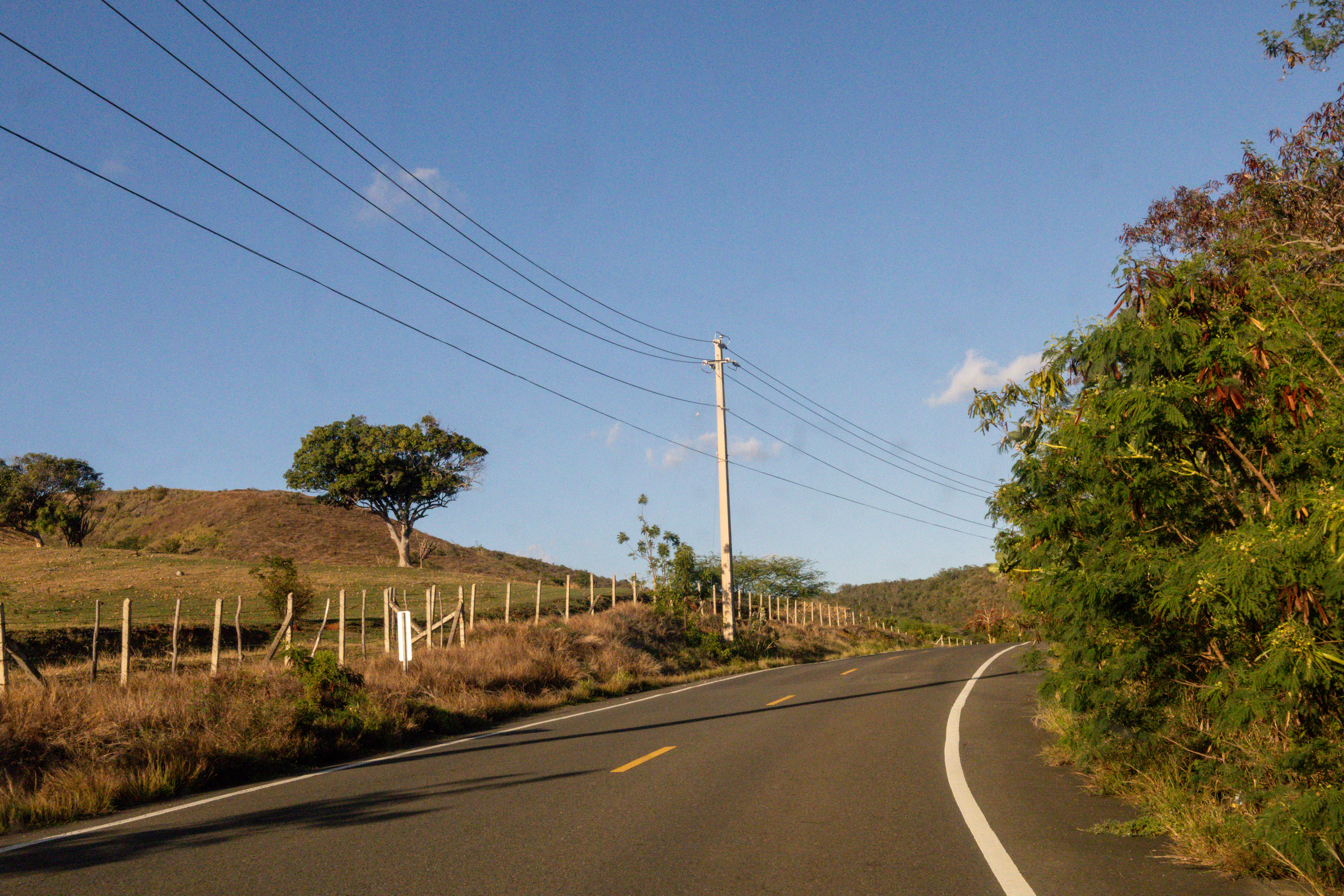
PR-303 heading east

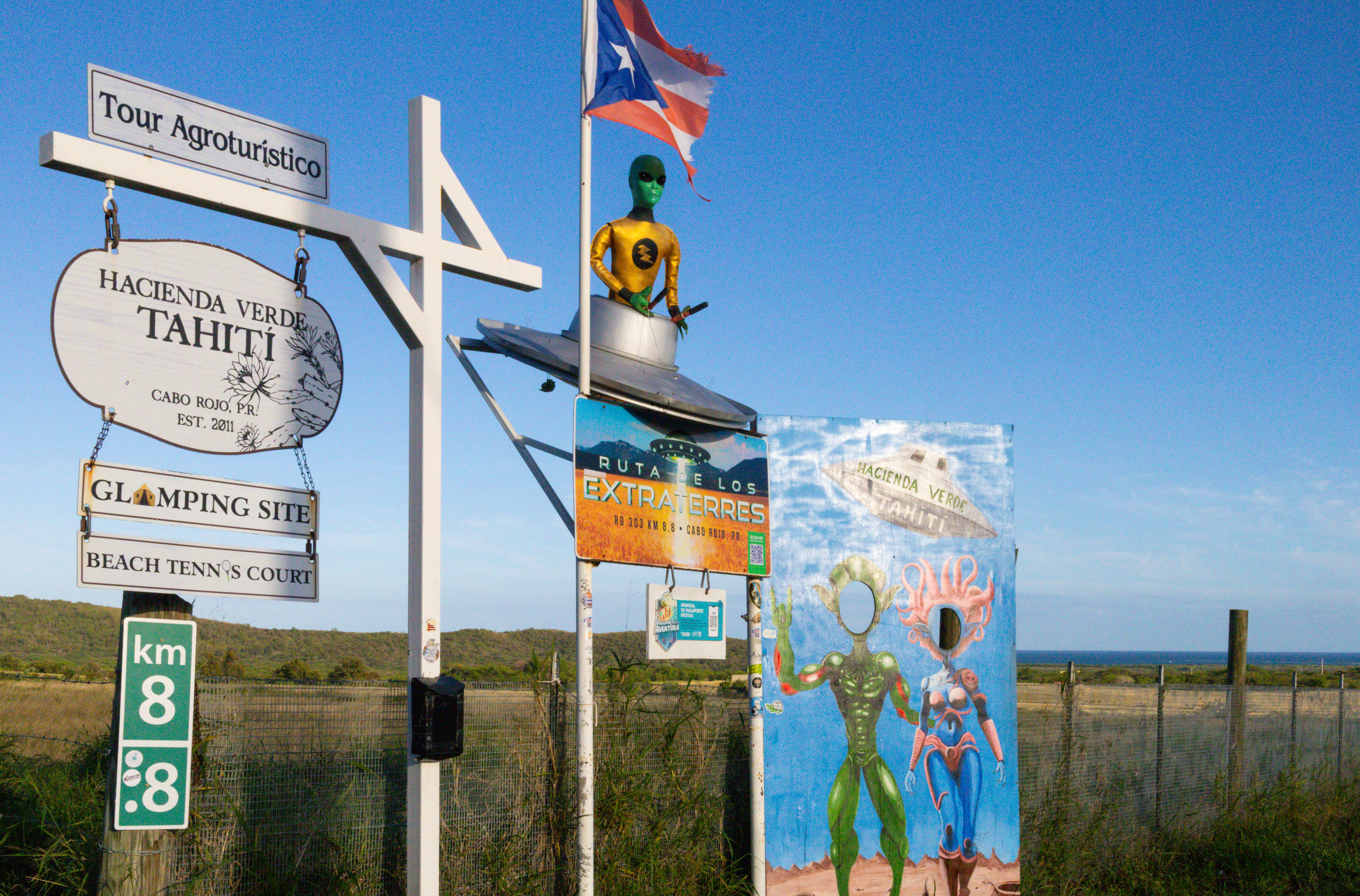
Signs for Ruta Extraterrestre on PR-303

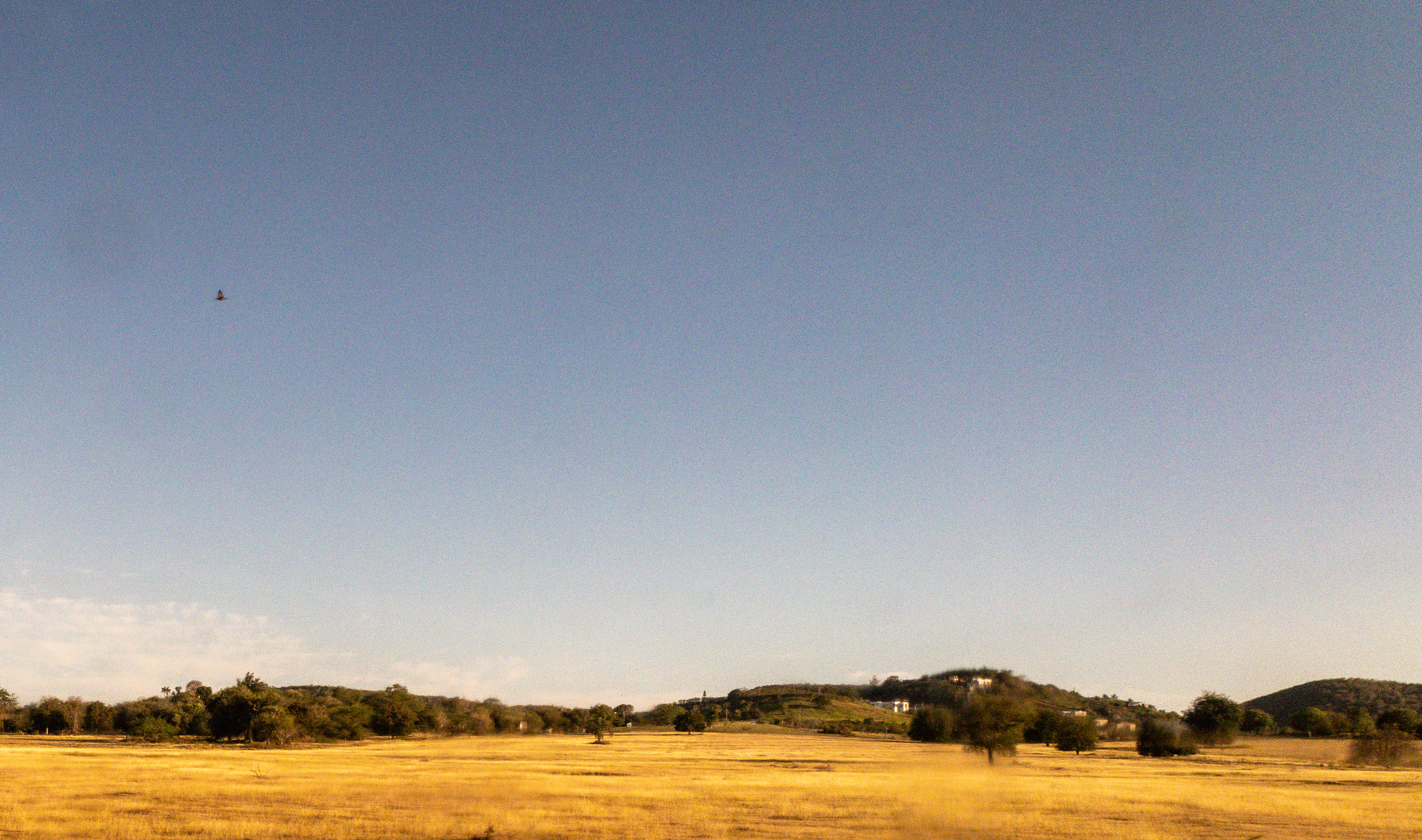
Lajas Valley from PR-303

== Major intersections ==
Municipality	Location	km	mi	Destinations	Notes
Cabo Rojo	Boquerón	14.7	9.1	PR-301	Western terminus of PR-303
Cabo Rojo	Llanos Costa	11.3	7.0	PR-302	Unsigned
Lajas	Palmarejo–Parguera line	2.6	1.6	PR-305	Southern terminus of PR-305 concurrency
Lajas	Palmarejo–Parguera– Sabana Yeguas tripoint	2.5	1.6	PR-305 (Corredor Agroturístico Jorge Alberto "George" Ferrer Asencio) – Guánica, Parguera	Northern terminus of PR-305 concurrency
Lajas	Palmarejo	0.0	0.0	PR-101	Eastern terminus of PR-303
1.000 mi = 1.609 km; 1.000 km = 0.621 mi: Concurrency terminus

== See also ==
- Porta del Sol
