= Ensenada, Guánica, Puerto Rico =

Barrio of Puerto Rico

Ensenada
- Barrio
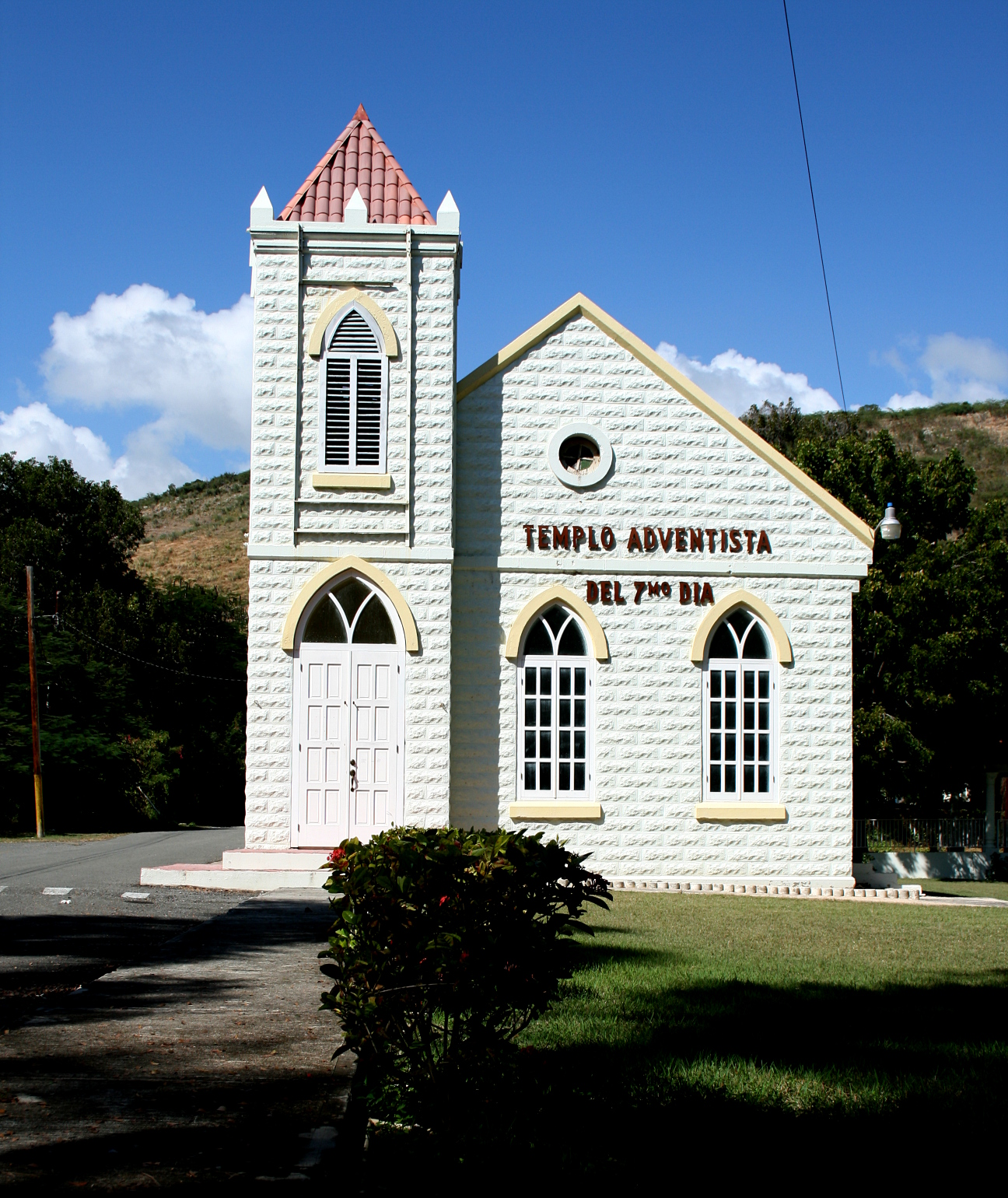
- Seventh-day Adventist Church in Ensenada

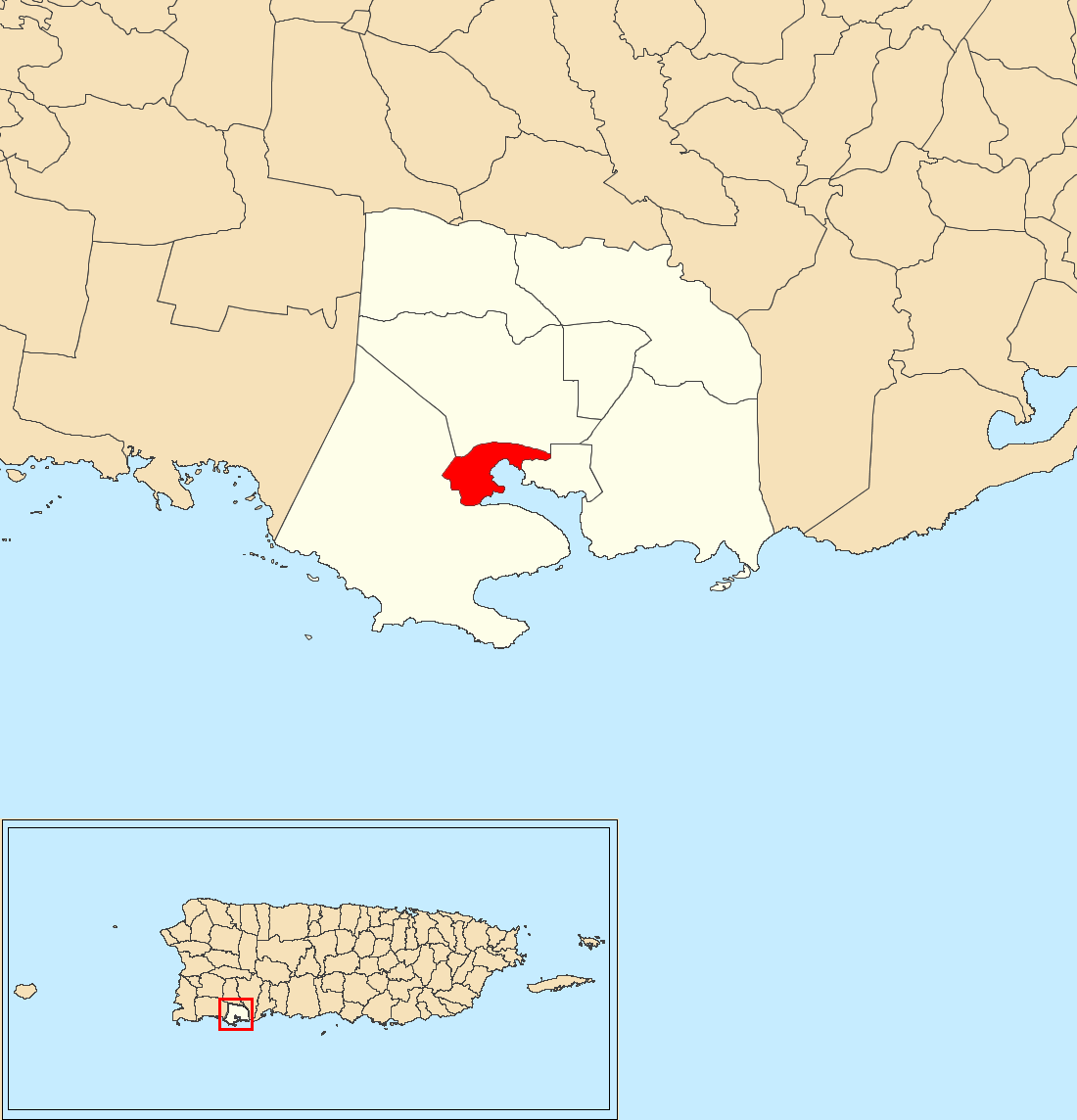
- Location of Ensenada within the municipality of Guánica shown in red

- Location of Puerto Rico
- Coordinates: 17°58′06″N 66°55′45″W
- Commonwealth: Puerto Rico
- Municipality: Guánica

Area
  - Total: 1.04 sq mi (2.7 km^{2})
  - Land: 0.79 sq mi (2.0 km^{2})
  - Water: 0.25 sq mi (0.65 km^{2})
- Elevation: 7 ft (2.1 m)

Population (2010)
  - Total: 1,705
  - Density: 2,158.2/sq mi (833.3/km^{2})
- Source: 2010 Census
- Time zone: UTC−4 (AST)
- ZIP Code: 00647

Ensenada is a barrio in the municipality of Guánica, Puerto Rico. Its population in 2010 was 1,705. The ruins of what was once an important sugar production plant are in Ensenada.

== History ==
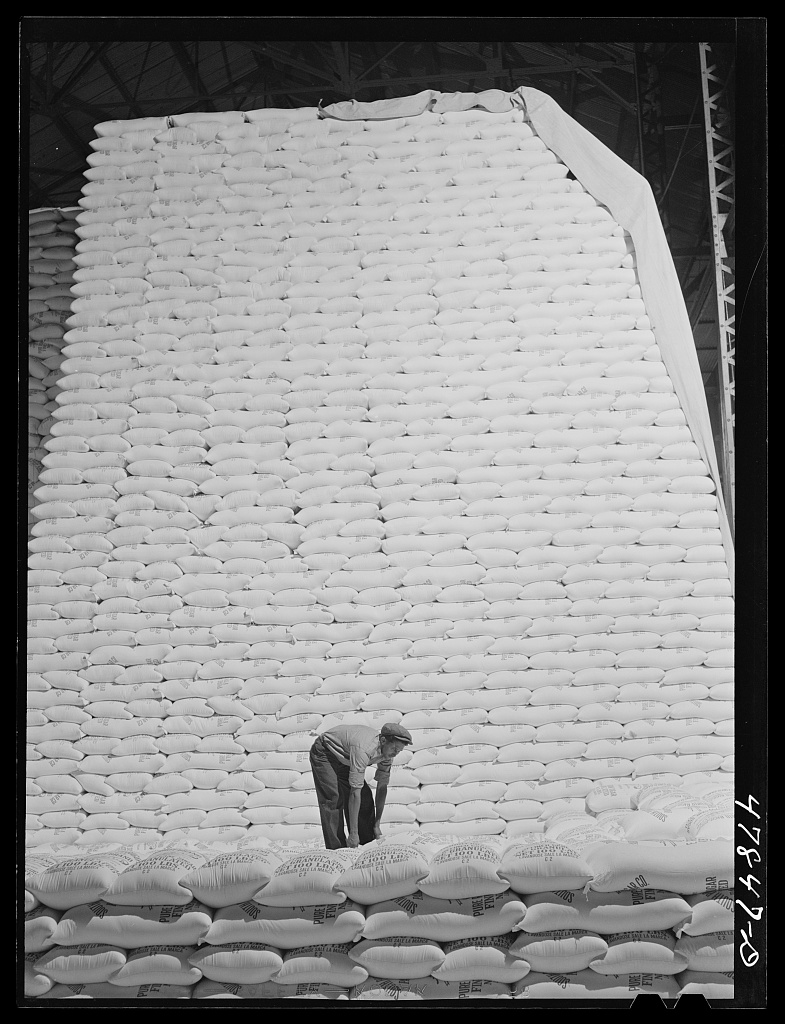
Ensenada, Puerto Rico. Bags of refined sugar in the warehouse of the South Puerto Rico Sugar Company

During the height of sugar production in Puerto Rico, Ensenada's economy was based on its sugar mill and processing plant. During this prosperous time of sugar production in Ensenada, the community sought to become its own town, separate from Guánica but once the sugar mill closed in 1982 resolved to remain part of the Guánica municipality.

Plaza Yomo Toro, named after musician Yomo Toro, is located in Ensenada, where people sometimes gather during holiday and other celebrations.

A historic inn, the parador Guánica, which was built in 1929, is located in Ensenada and withstood the 2019–20 Puerto Rico earthquakes, serving as a refuge for personnel from the Federal Emergency Management Agency.

Historical population
Census	Pop.	Note	%±
1930	4,205		—
1940	4,829		14.8%
1950	4,730		−2.1%
1960	3,229		−31.7%
1970	0		−100.0%
1980	1,982		—
1990	2,108		6.4%
2000	2,184		3.6%
2010	1,705		−21.9%
U.S. Decennial Census; 1899 (shown as 1900) 1910-1930; 1930-1950 1980-2000 2010

== Gallery ==
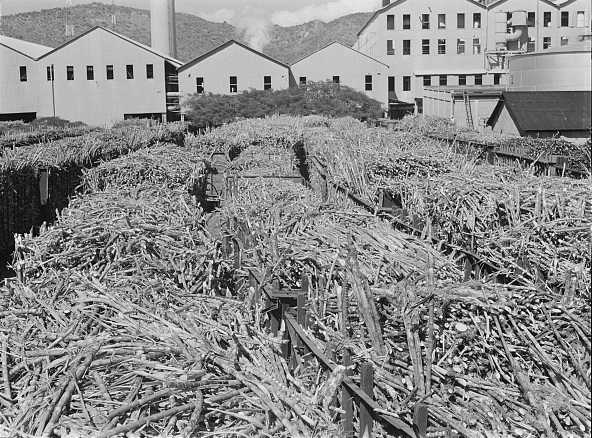
Photo by Jack Delano of "Ensenada, Guanica. Carloads of sugar cane at the South Puerto Rico Sugar Company" (c. January 1942)

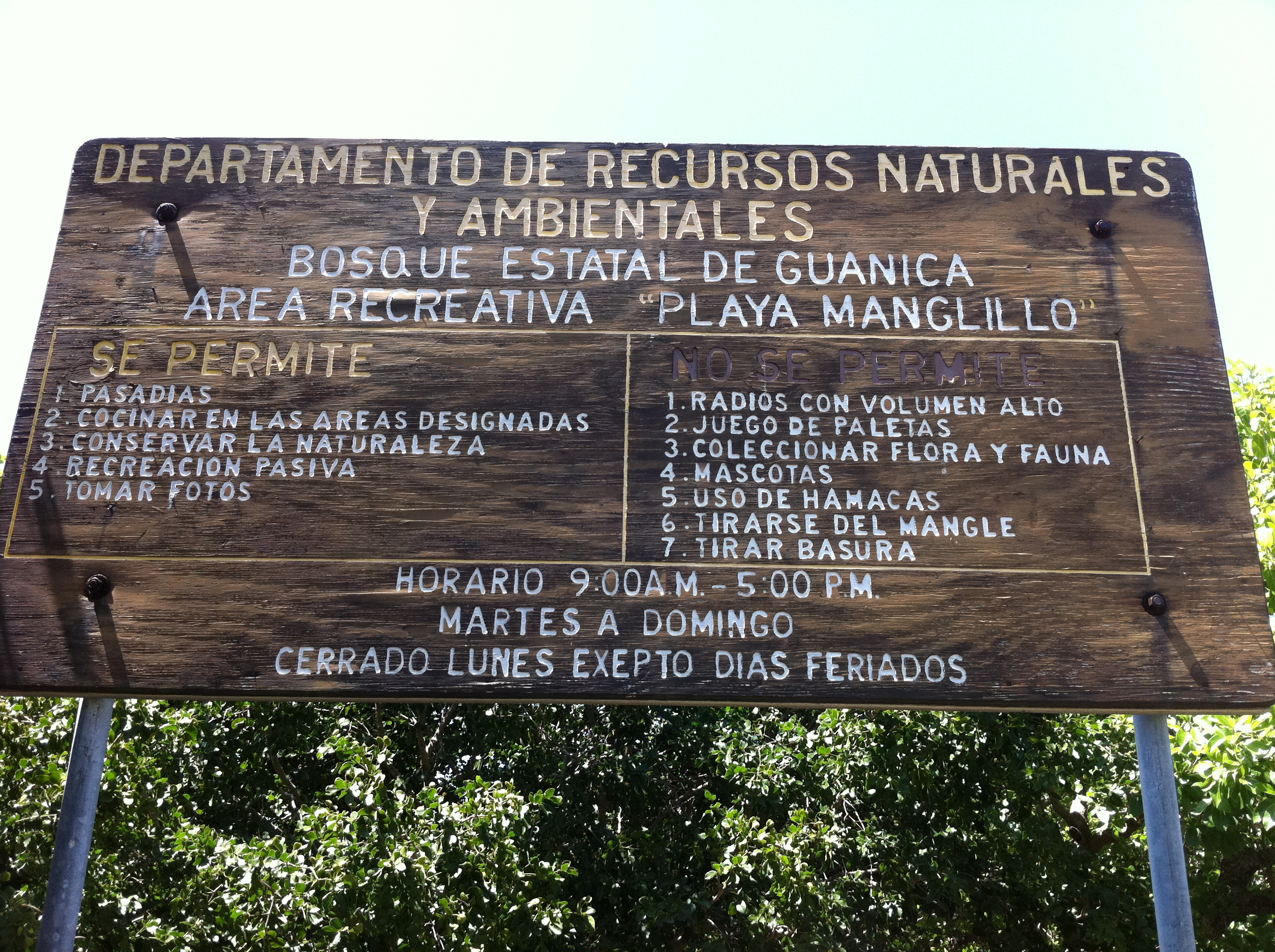
Sign for Manglillo Beach in Guánica

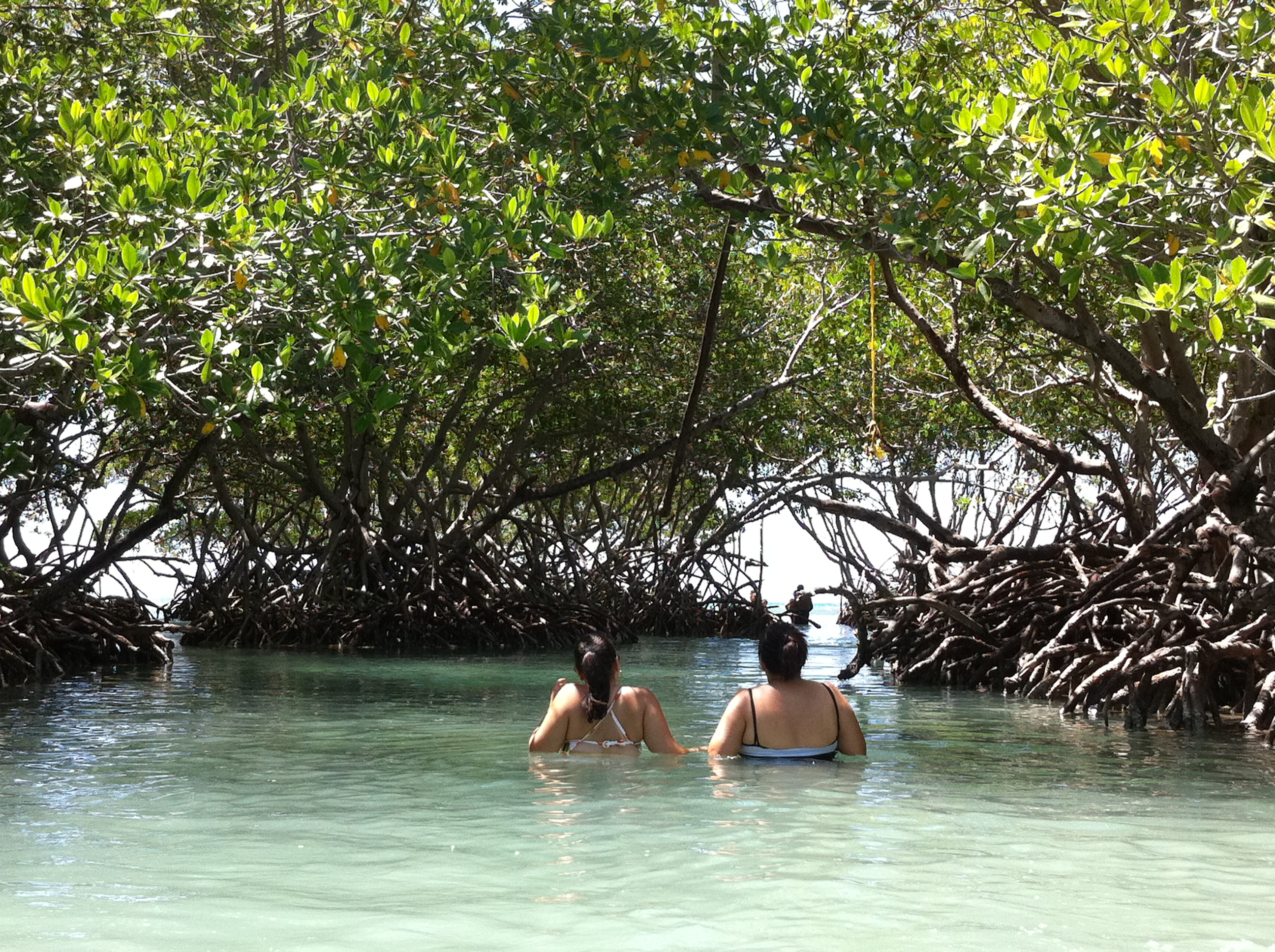
Women wading near mangroves in Manglillo Beach

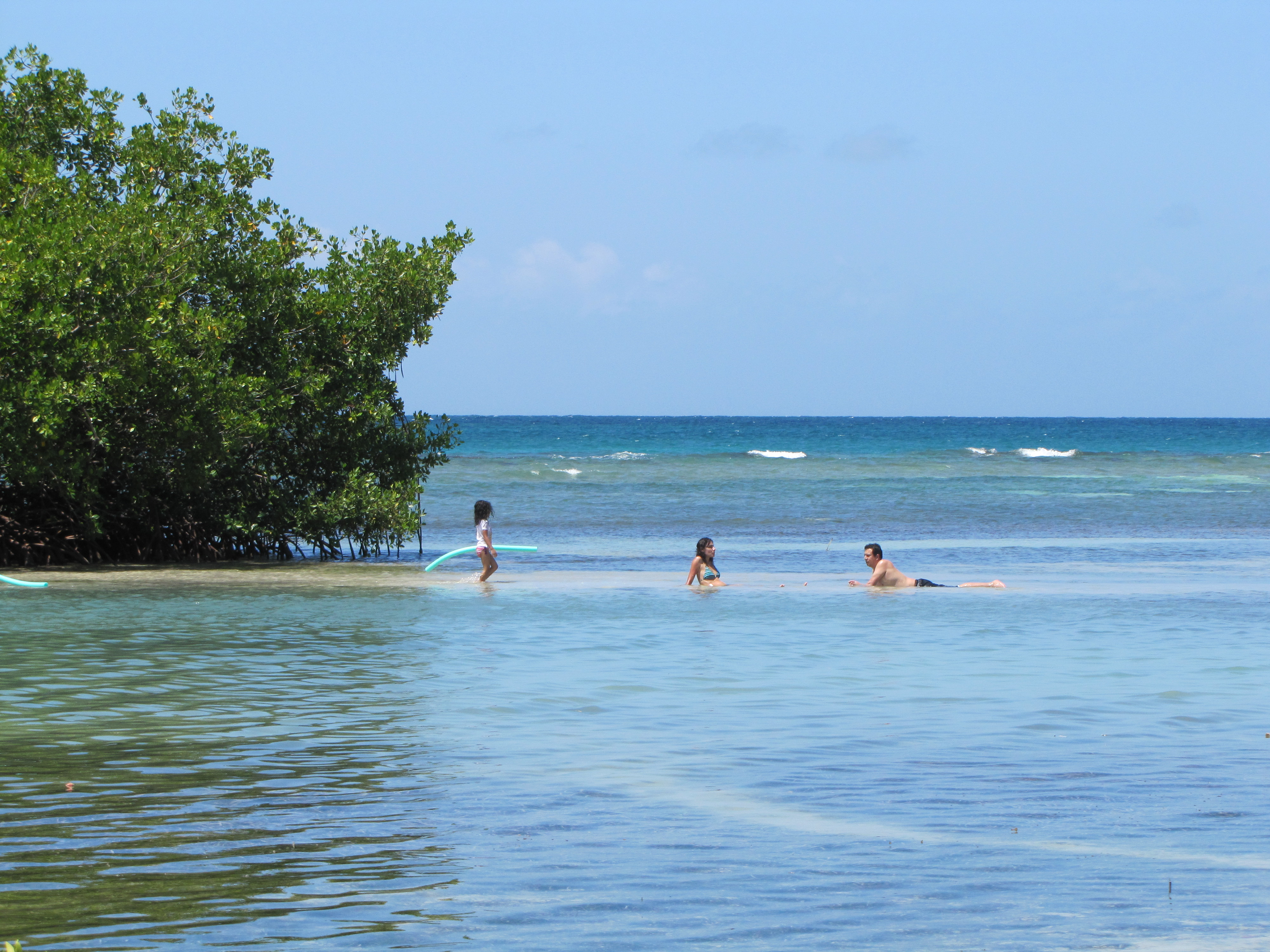
On a sandbar in Manglillo Beach

== See also ==
- List of communities in Puerto Rico
