= Puerto Rico Highway 301 =

Highway in Puerto Rico

Highway 301
- Ruta 301
- Carretera Antonio J. "Tony" Fas Alzamora

Route information
- Maintained by Puerto Rico DTPW
- Length: 11.5 km (7.1 mi)

Major junctions
- South end: Los Morrillos Light in Llanos Costa–Boquerón
- PR-3301 in Llanos Costa–Boquerón; PR-303 in Boquerón; PR-100 in Boquerón
- North end: PR-101 in Llanos Costa–Boquerón

Location
- Country: United States
- Territory: Puerto Rico
- Municipalities: Cabo Rojo

Highway system
- Roads in Puerto Rico; List
← PR-253	→ PR-303
← PR-3132	PR-3301	→ PR-3342

Puerto Rico Highway 301 (PR-301) is a main highway in Cabo Rojo, Puerto Rico. It begins in PR-101, close to PR-100 (PR-100 makes a final intersection with PR-101 before ending in PR-301), and goes south all the way to Los Morrillos Light, where it ends. It is the main access to the lighthouse, the Cabo Rojo cliffs, and Playa Sucia.

PR-301 is one of the few roads in Puerto Rico that are not entirely asphalted; the final kilometers are only sand. That same segment is surrounded by a desalinization plant.

== Major intersections ==
The entire route is located in Cabo Rojo.

Location	km	mi	Destinations	Notes
Llanos Costa–Boquerón line	11.5	7.1	Southern terminus of PR-301 at Los Morrillos Light; dead end road	
Llanos Costa–Boquerón line	7.8	4.8	PR-3301 – Combate	
Boquerón	4.3	2.7	PR-303 – Lajas	
Boquerón	0.9– 0.8	0.56– 0.50	PR-100 north (Avenida Antonio J. "Tony" Fas Alzamora) – Boquerón	Seagull intersection
Llanos Costa–Boquerón line	0.0	0.0	PR-101 – Cabo Rojo, Boquerón, Lajas	Northern terminus of PR-301
1.000 mi = 1.609 km; 1.000 km = 0.621 mi

== Related route ==
Highway 3301
- Location: Cabo Rojo
- Length: 2.9 km (1.8 mi)

Puerto Rico Highway 3301 (PR-3301) is an alternate route, or ramal, from its parent route PR-301, and the main (and only) access to Cabo Rojo’s famous beach El Combate. The entire route is located in Cabo Rojo.

Location	km	mi	Destinations	Notes
Boquerón	2.9	1.8	PR-Calle Mariana Bracetti – Combate	Western terminus of PR-3301
Llanos Costa–Boquerón line	0.0	0.0	PR-301 – Cabo Rojo	Eastern terminus of PR-3301
1.000 mi = 1.609 km; 1.000 km = 0.621 mi

== See also ==
- Tony Fas Alzamora
