= Lajas, Lajas, Puerto Rico =

Barrio of Puerto Rico

Lajas
- Barrio
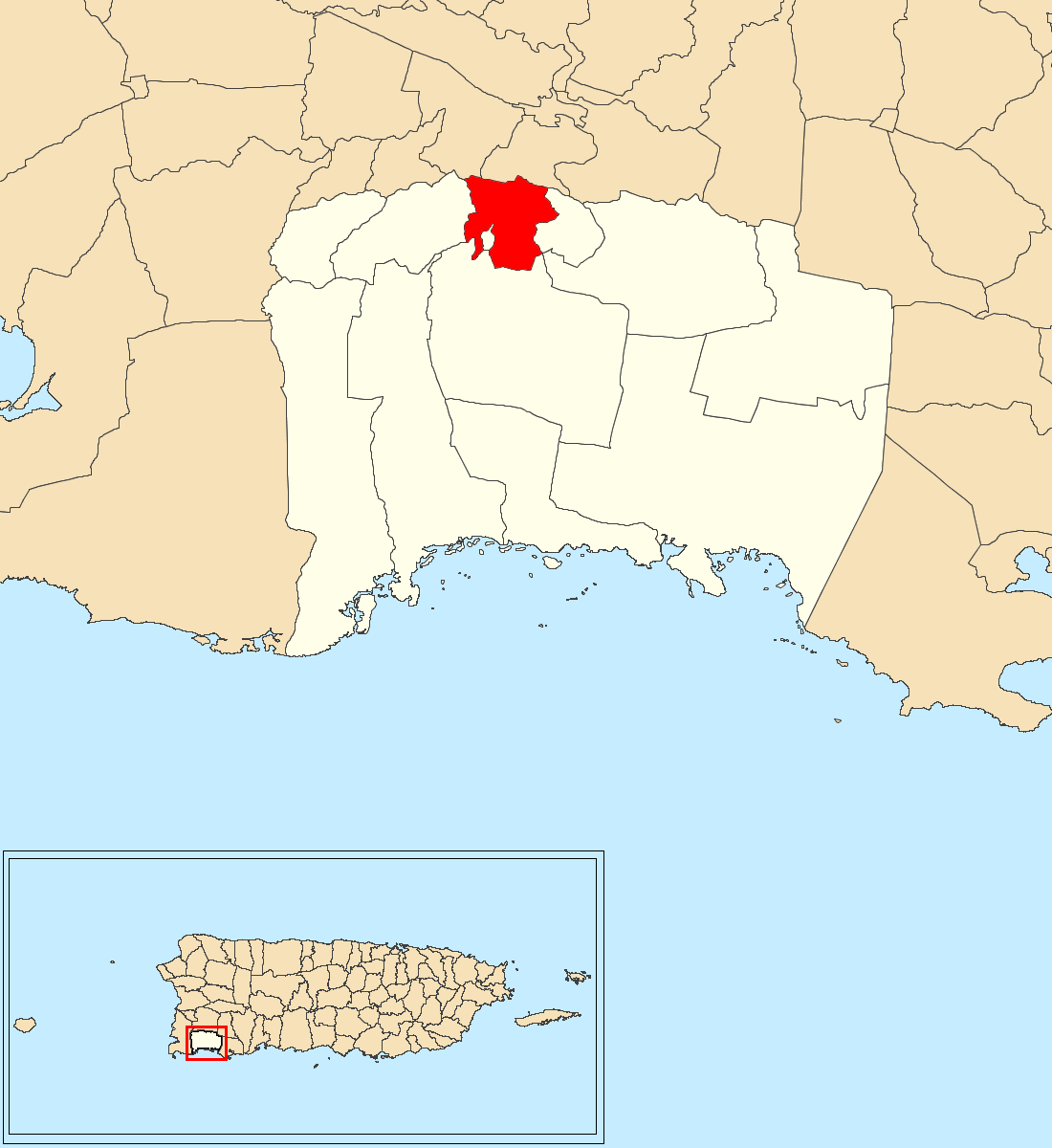
- Location of Lajas within the municipality of Lajas shown in red

- Location of Puerto Rico
- Coordinates: 18°03′27″N 67°02′58″W
- Commonwealth: Puerto Rico
- Municipality: Lajas

Area
  - Total: 1.6 sq mi (4.1 km^{2})
  - Land: 1.6 sq mi (4.1 km^{2})
  - Water: 0 sq mi (0 km^{2})
- Elevation: 217 ft (66 m)

Population (2010)
  - Total: 2,694
  - Density: 1,683.8/sq mi (650.1/km^{2})
- Source: 2010 Census
- Time zone: UTC−4 (AST)

Lajas is a barrio in the municipality of Lajas, Puerto Rico. Its population in 2010 was 2,694.

Historical population
Census	Pop.	Note	%±
1940	900		—
1950	2,544		182.7%
1960	2,369		−6.9%
1970	0		−100.0%
1980	2,095		—
1990	2,166		3.4%
2000	2,331		7.6%
2010	2,694		15.6%
U.S. Decennial Census; 1940-1950 1980-2000 2010

== See also ==
- List of communities in Puerto Rico
