= Paradores in Puerto Rico =

Hotels often located in a historic building

Paradores de Puerto Rico
- Industry: Hospitality
- Founded: 1973
- Headquarters: Puerto Rico
- Number of locations: 13
- Area served: Puerto Rico
- Products: Hotels, resorts
- Owner: Each parador is privately owned

Paradores in Puerto Rico is a brand of small inns similar to bed and breakfasts that have government permission to call themselves paradores based on a set of criteria. These inns are scattered across the island countryside, outside the main metropolitan area of San Juan. Often called "country inns" in English, paradores in Puerto Rico are known for their hospitality, affordable rates, exotic locations, and traditional Puerto Rican cuisine. They are frequented by guests looking to enjoy the local customs and charm.

== History ==
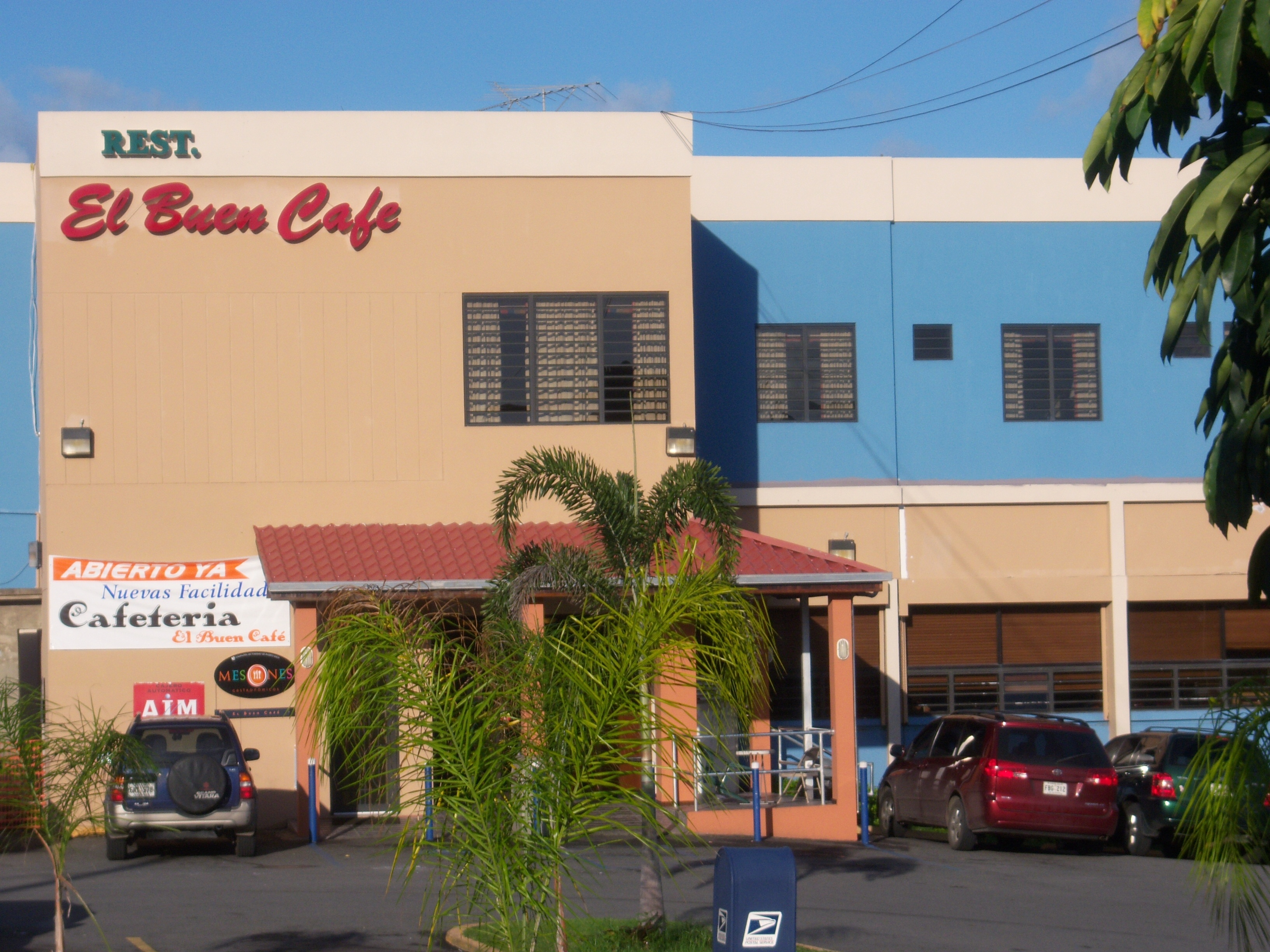
Parador El Buen Café in Hatillo

Traditionally, a parador in Spain and other Spanish-speaking countries was an establishment where travelers could seek lodging, and usually, food and drink, similar to an inn. In Spain since 1928, a parador is a state-owned luxury hotel, usually located in a converted historic building such as a monastery or castle, or in a modern building with a panoramic view of a historic and monumental city.

The Puerto Rico Tourism Company established the Paradores de Puerto Rico brand in 1973 under the administration of Governor Luis A. Ferre, who wanted to enhance the tourism sector of the island. The company runs an enterprise known by the same name, Paradores de Puerto Rico, which are typically small, one-of-a-kind, locally owned and operated hotels located in rural areas throughout the island commonwealth.

The inns work with FEMA to provide temporary residence when a major emergency, such as a hurricane or earthquake, displaces people in Puerto Rico.

== Participation ==
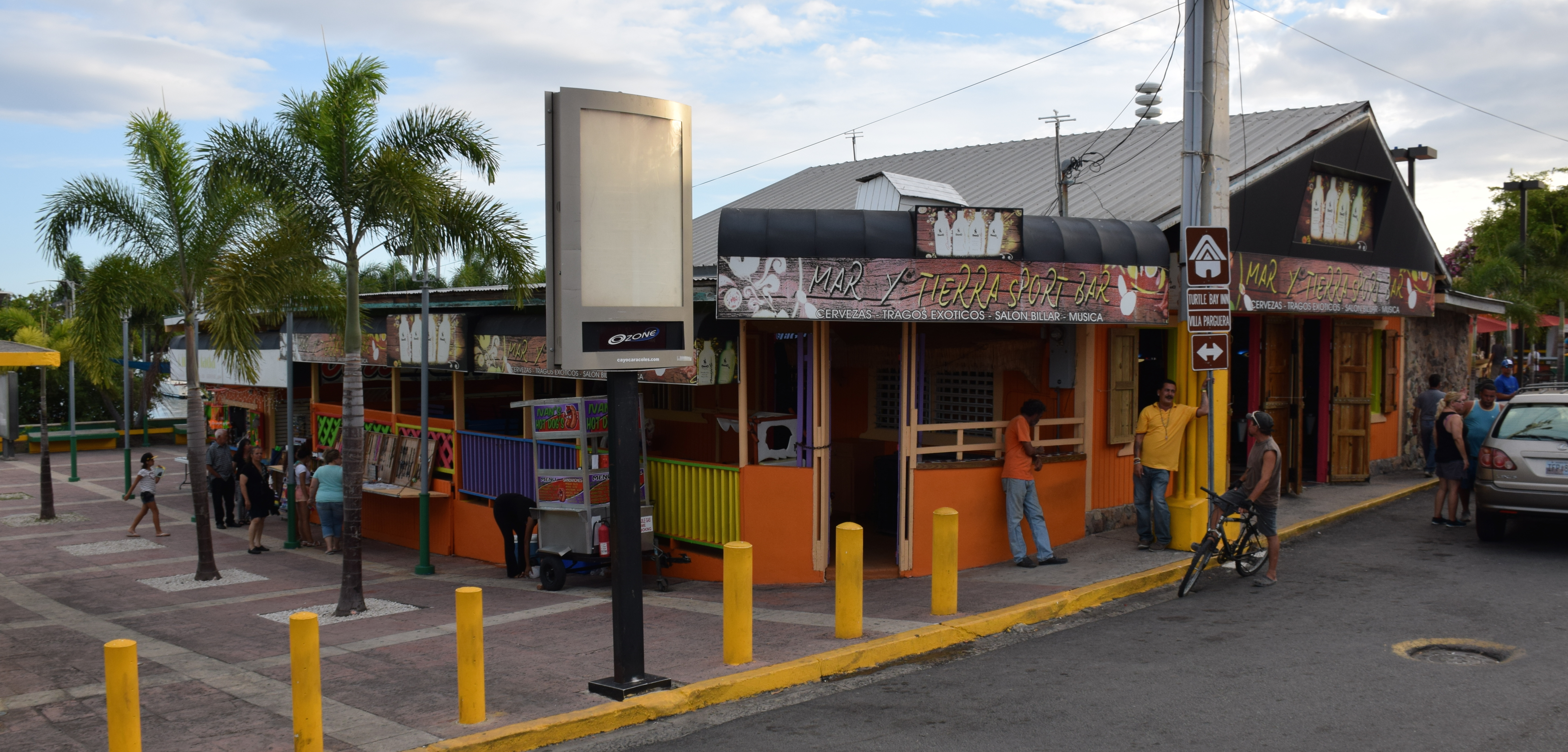
Sign for Parador Villa Parguera near the bioluminescent night tours in La Parquera

In Puerto Rico for an inn to be included on its list of paradores, it has to be a privately owned hotel participating in a special government program. This program assures a certain level of quality in the service, cuisine and other aspects of a tourist's stay. Currently there are 13 of these inns in Puerto Rico, with the biggest concentration around the west coast of the island. In 2018, the brand announced they had invested more than a million dollars in renovations. During the 2019 Easter spring holiday, some inns reported 100% occupancy rates, thanks also in part to local tourism.

== Current paradores ==
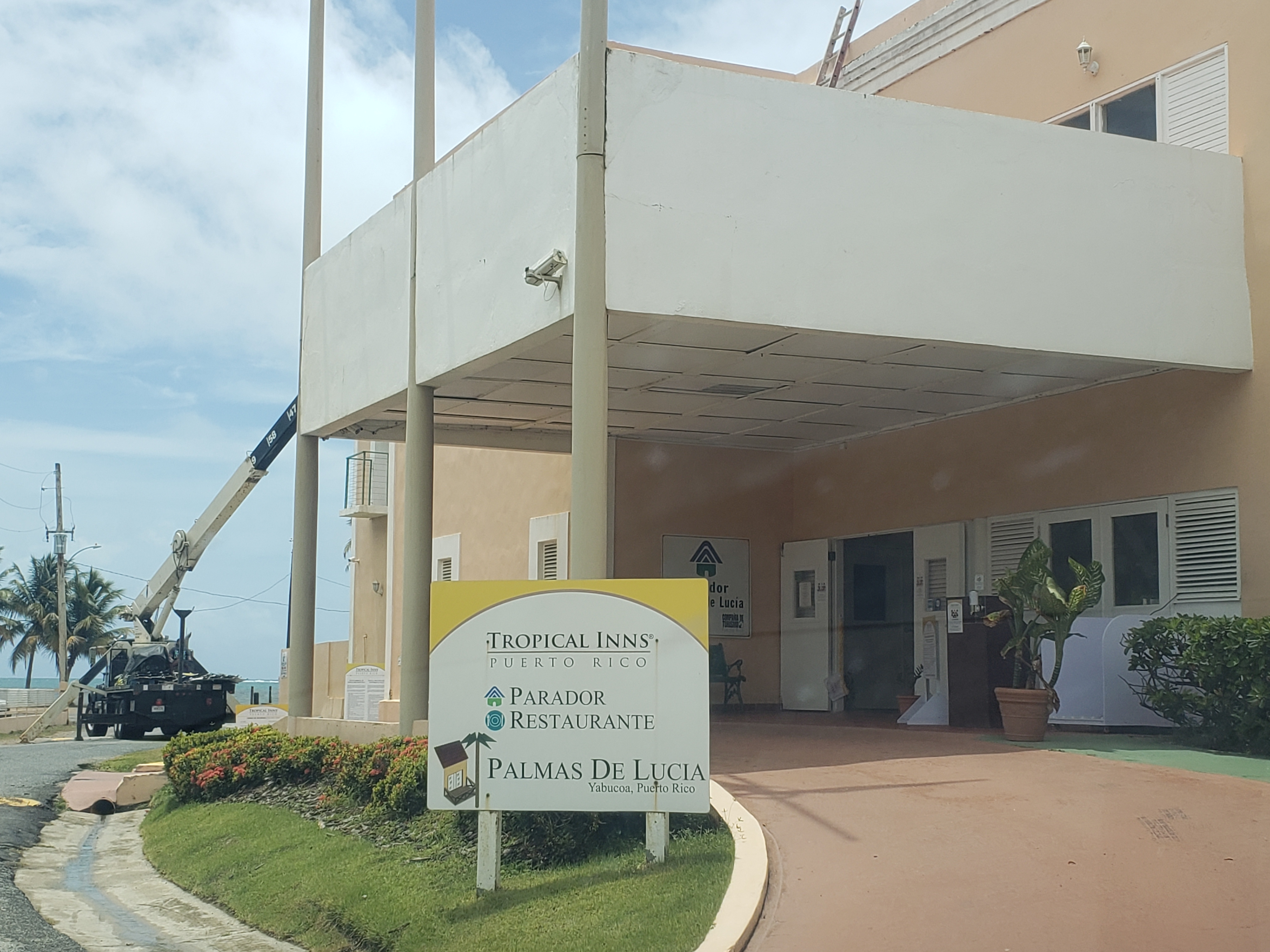
Palmas de Lucía Parador in Yabucoa in 2020

The following are the paradores that were operational as of 2019:

1. Boquemar in Boquerón, Cabo Rojo
2. Combate Beach Resort (Playa El Combate) in Cabo Rojo
3. Costa del Mar in Yabucoa
4. El Buen Café in Hatillo
5. El Faro in Aguadilla
6. Guánica 1929 in Guánica
7. Mauna Caribe in Maunabo
8. Palmas de Lucía in Yabucoa
9. Turtle Bay Inn in La Parguera, Lajas
10. Villas del Mar Hau in Isabela
11. Villa Parguera in La Parguera, Lajas
12. Villas Sotomayor in Adjuntas
13. Yunque Mar in Luquillo

== Past paradores ==
In 2003, there were 23 paradores. Some of the paradores that were on the list then include:

- Parador Oasis in San Germán
- Parador El Guajataca in Quebradillas

== See also ==
- Tourism in Puerto Rico
- List of hotels in Puerto Rico
