= Montalva =

Barrio of Guánica, Puerto Rico

- Barrio
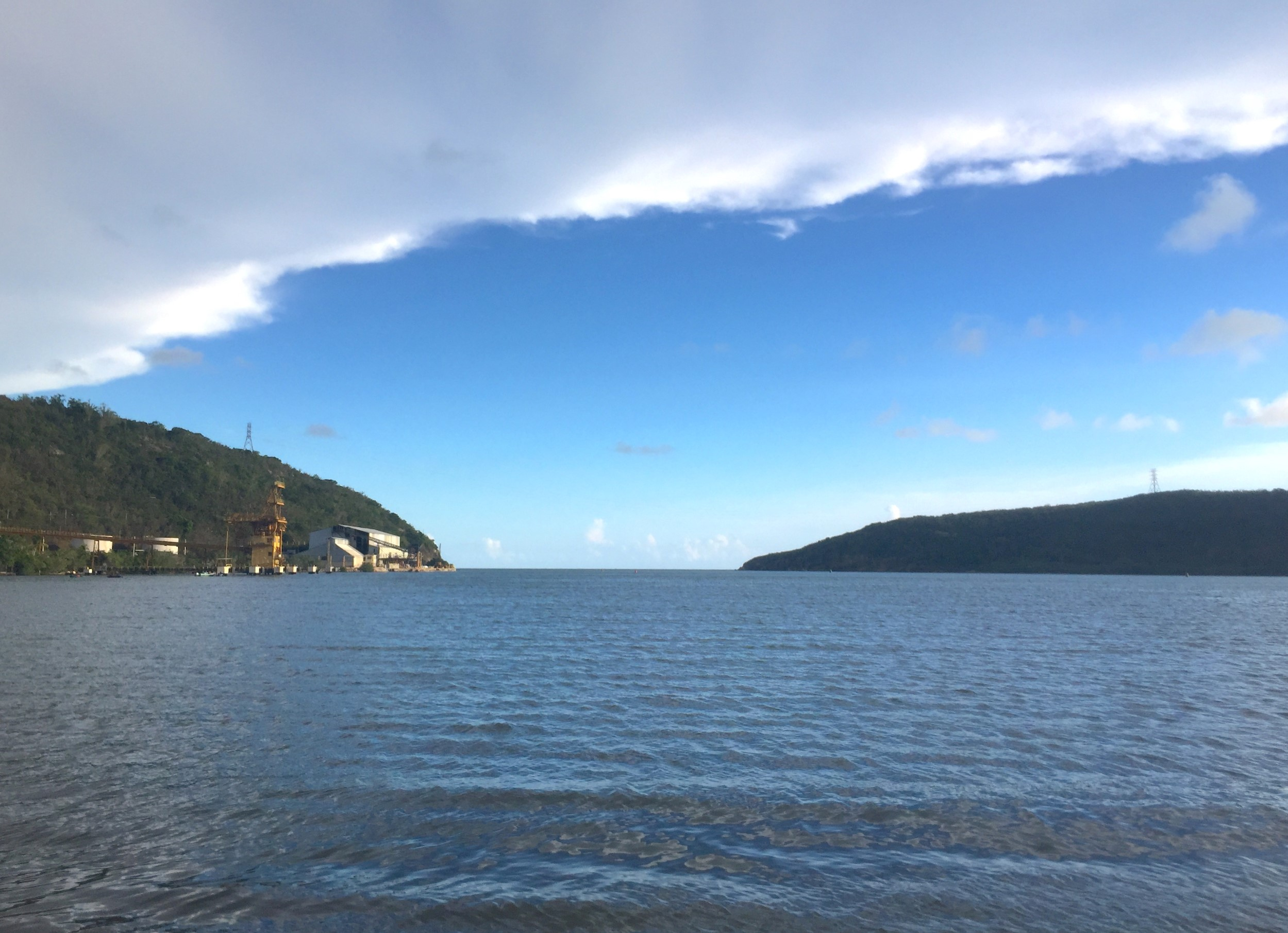
- Guánica Bay

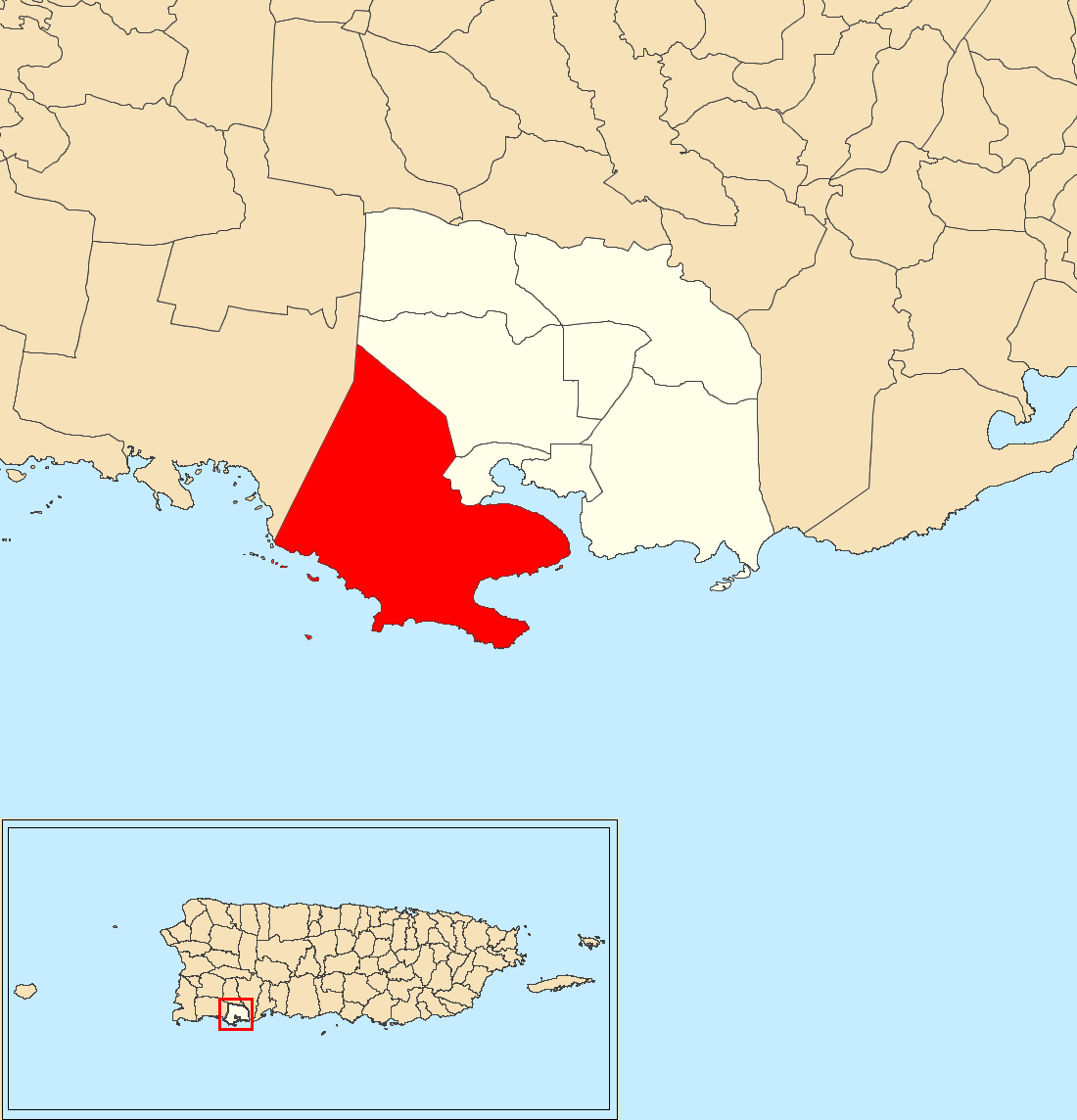
- Location of Montalva within the municipality of Guánica shown in red

- Location of Puerto Rico
- Coordinates: 17°56′54″N 66°56′43″W
- Commonwealth: Puerto Rico
- Municipality: Guánica

Area
  - Total: 14.65 sq mi (37.9 km^{2})
  - Land: 10.85 sq mi (28.1 km^{2})
  - Water: 3.80 sq mi (9.8 km^{2})
- Elevation: 138 ft (42 m)

Population (2010)
  - Total: 3,181
  - Density: 293.2/sq mi (113.2/km^{2})
- Source: 2010 Census
- Time zone: UTC−4 (AST)
- ZIP Code: 00653

Montalva is a barrio in the municipality of Guánica, Puerto Rico. Its population in 2010 was 3,181.

Historical population
Census	Pop.	Note	%±
1930	313		—
1940	700		123.6%
1950	1,801		157.3%
1960	1,849		2.7%
1970	0		−100.0%
1980	2,829		—
1990	2,893		2.3%
2000	3,148		8.8%
2010	3,181		1.0%
U.S. Decennial Census; 1899 (shown as 1900) 1910-1930; 1930-1950 1980-2000 2010

== See also ==
- List of communities in Puerto Rico
