= Costa, Lajas, Puerto Rico =

Barrio of Puerto Rico

Costa
- Barrio
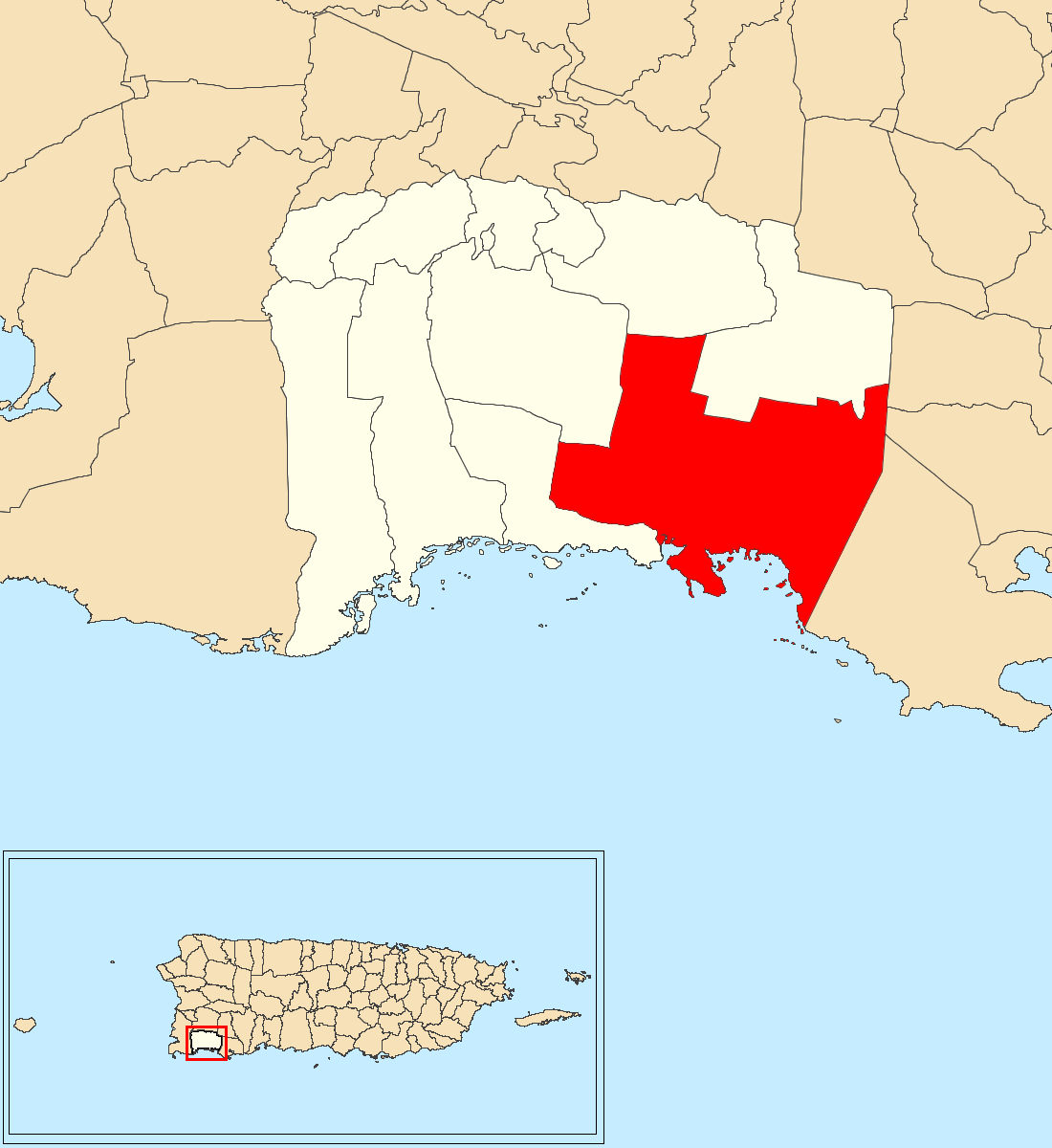
- Location of Costa within the municipality of Lajas shown in red

- Location of Puerto Rico
- Coordinates: 17°59′04″N 67°00′04″W
- Commonwealth: Puerto Rico
- Municipality: Lajas

Area
  - Total: 18.32 sq mi (47.4 km^{2})
  - Land: 13.85 sq mi (35.9 km^{2})
  - Water: 4.47 sq mi (11.6 km^{2})
- Elevation: 75 ft (23 m)

Population (2010)
  - Total: 1,628
  - Density: 117.5/sq mi (45.4/km^{2})
- Source: 2010 Census
- Time zone: UTC−4 (AST)

Costa is a barrio in the municipality of Lajas, Puerto Rico. Its population in 2010 was 1,628.

== History ==
Costa was in Spain's gazetteers until Puerto Rico was ceded by Spain in the aftermath of the Spanish–American War under the terms of the Treaty of Paris of 1898 and became an unincorporated territory of the United States. In 1899, the United States Department of War conducted a census of Puerto Rico finding that the combined population of Costa and Parguera barrios was 1,256.

Historical population
Census	Pop.	Note	%±
1910	852		—
1920	700		−17.8%
1930	599		−14.4%
1940	865		44.4%
1950	1,099		27.1%
1960	785		−28.6%
1970	664		−15.4%
1980	1,198		80.4%
1990	1,516		26.5%
2000	1,730		14.1%
2010	1,628		−5.9%
U.S. Decennial Census; 1900 (N/A) 1910-1930; 1930-1950 1980-2000 2010

== See also ==
- List of communities in Puerto Rico
