= Susúa Baja, Guánica, Puerto Rico =

Barrio of Puerto Rico

Susúa Baja
- Barrio
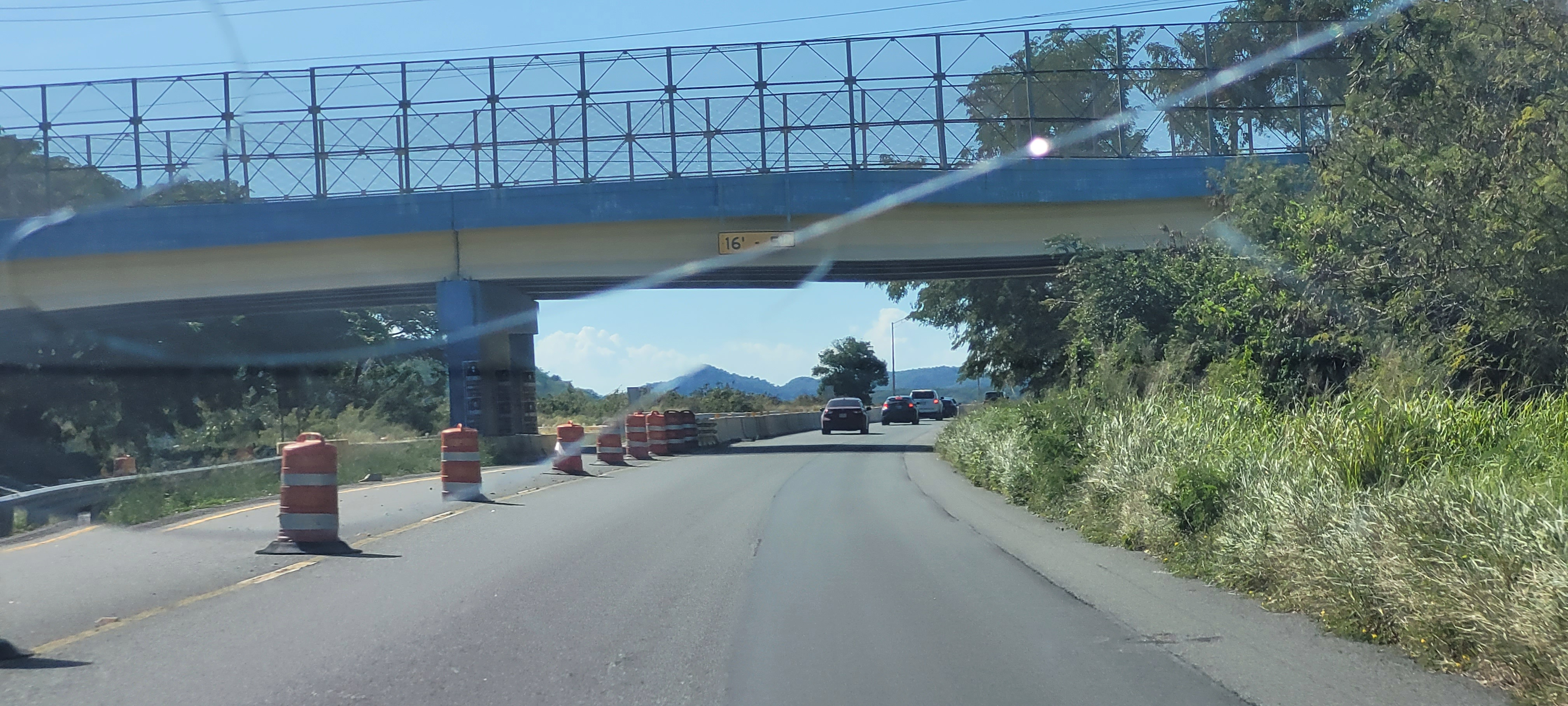
- Puerto Rico Highway 2 in Susúa Baja

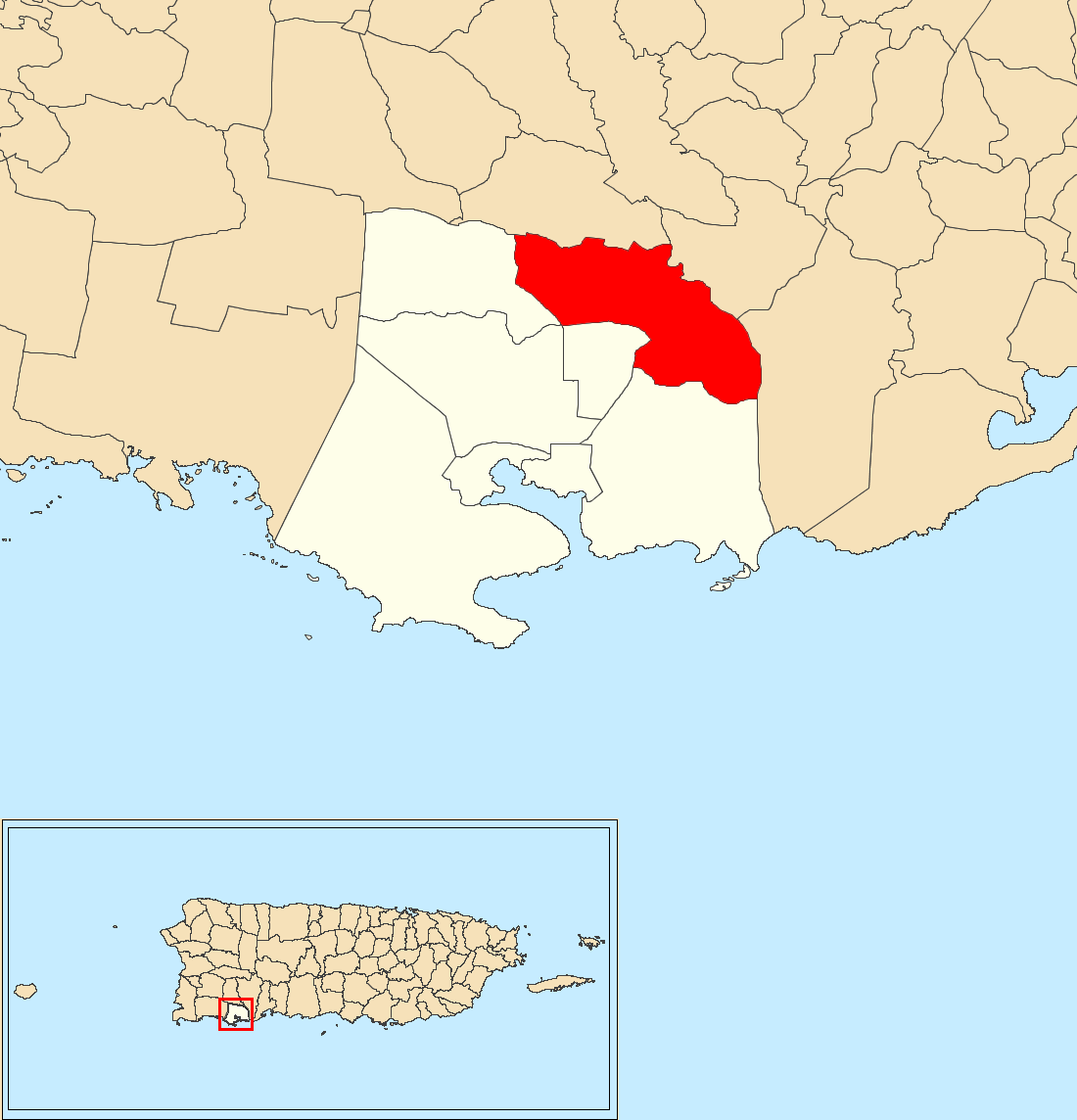
- Location of Susúa Baja within the municipality of Guánica shown in red

- Location of Puerto Rico
- Coordinates: 18°00′36″N 66°53′31″W
- Commonwealth: Puerto Rico
- Municipality: Guánica

Area
  - Total: 5.65 sq mi (14.6 km^{2})
  - Land: 5.63 sq mi (14.6 km^{2})
  - Water: 0.02 sq mi (0.052 km^{2})
- Elevation: 66 ft (20 m)

Population (2010)
  - Total: 4,242
  - Density: 753.5/sq mi (290.9/km^{2})
- Source: 2010 Census
- Time zone: UTC−4 (AST)
- ZIP Code: 00653

Susúa Baja is a barrio in the municipality of Guánica, Puerto Rico. Its population in 2010 was 4,242.

Historical population
| Census | Pop. | Note | %± |
|---|---|---|---|
| 1900 | 811 | | — |
| 1910 | 1,337 | | 64.9% |
| 1920 | 3,022 | | 126.0% |
| 1930 | 1,185 | | −60.8% |
| 1940 | 768 | | −35.2% |
| 1950 | 1,373 | | 78.8% |
| 1960 | 1,370 | | −0.2% |
| 1970 | 2,063 | | 50.6% |
| 1980 | 3,697 | | 79.2% |
| 1990 | 4,269 | | 15.5% |
| 2000 | 4,570 | | 7.1% |
| 2010 | 4,242 | | −7.2% |
U.S. Decennial Census; 1899 (shown as 1900) 1910-1930; 1930-1950 1980-2000 2010

== See also ==
- List of communities in Puerto Rico
