= Caño =

Barrio of Guánica, Puerto Rico

- Barrio
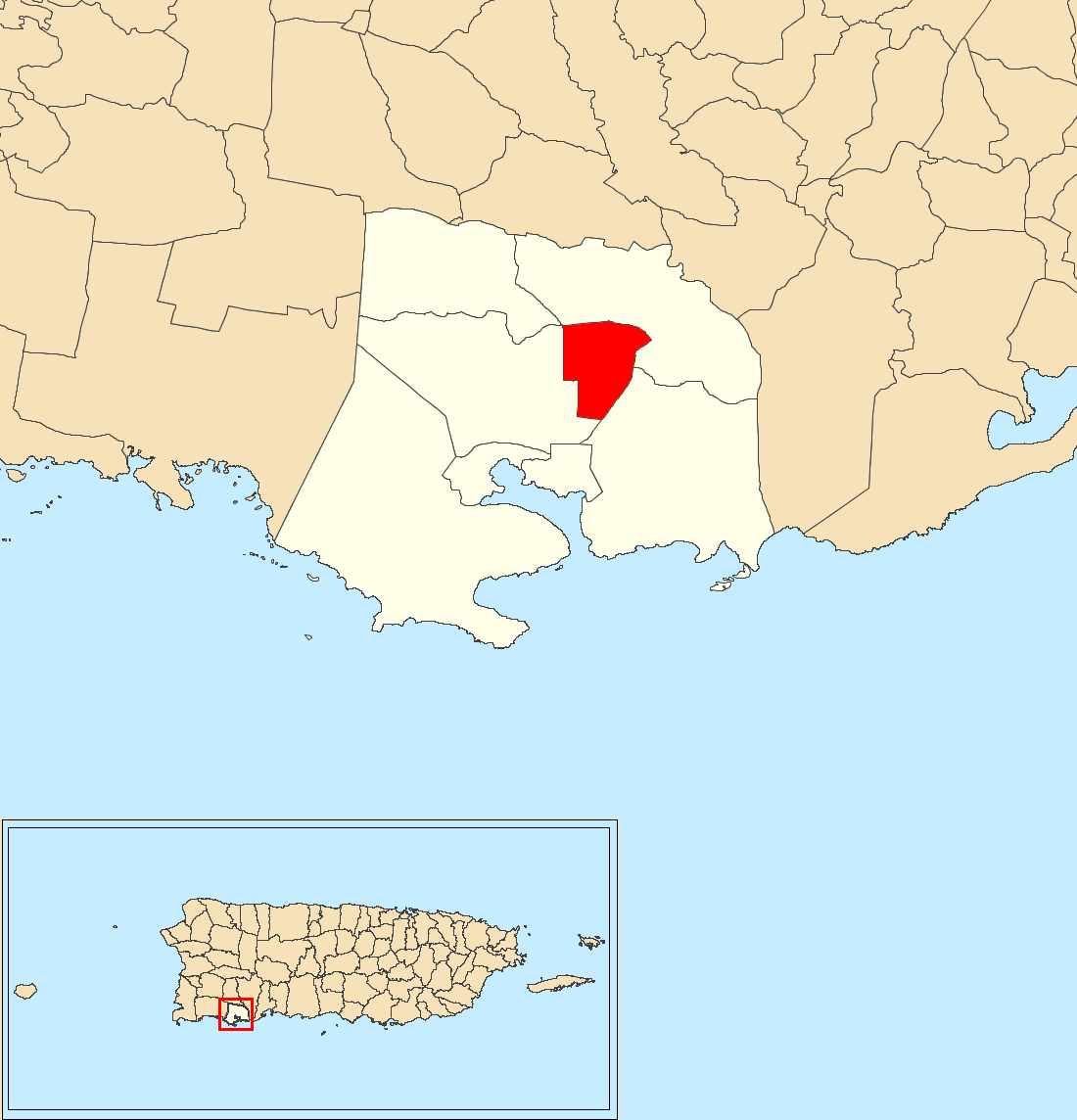
- Location of Caño within the municipality of Guánica shown in red

- Location of Puerto Rico
- Coordinates: 17°59′47″N 66°54′09″W
- Commonwealth: Puerto Rico
- Municipality: Guánica

Area
  - Total: 1.55 sq mi (4.0 km^{2})
  - Land: 1.55 sq mi (4.0 km^{2})
  - Water: 0 sq mi (0 km^{2})
- Elevation: 190 ft (58 m)

Population (2010)
  - Total: 1,788
  - Density: 1,161/sq mi (448/km^{2})
- Source: 2010 Census
- Time zone: UTC−4 (AST)
- ZIP Code: 00653

Caño is a barrio in the municipality of Guánica, Puerto Rico. Its population in 2010 was 1,788.

Historical population
Census	Pop.	Note	%±
1930	353		—
1940	743		110.5%
1950	685		−7.8%
1960	820		19.7%
1970	849		3.5%
1980	970		14.3%
1990	1,397		44.0%
2000	1,965		40.7%
2010	1,788		−9.0%
U.S. Decennial Census; 1899 (shown as 1900) 1910-1930; 1930-1950 1980-2000 2010

== See also ==
- List of communities in Puerto Rico
