= Ciénaga, Guánica, Puerto Rico =

Barrio of Puerto Rico

Ciénaga
- Barrio
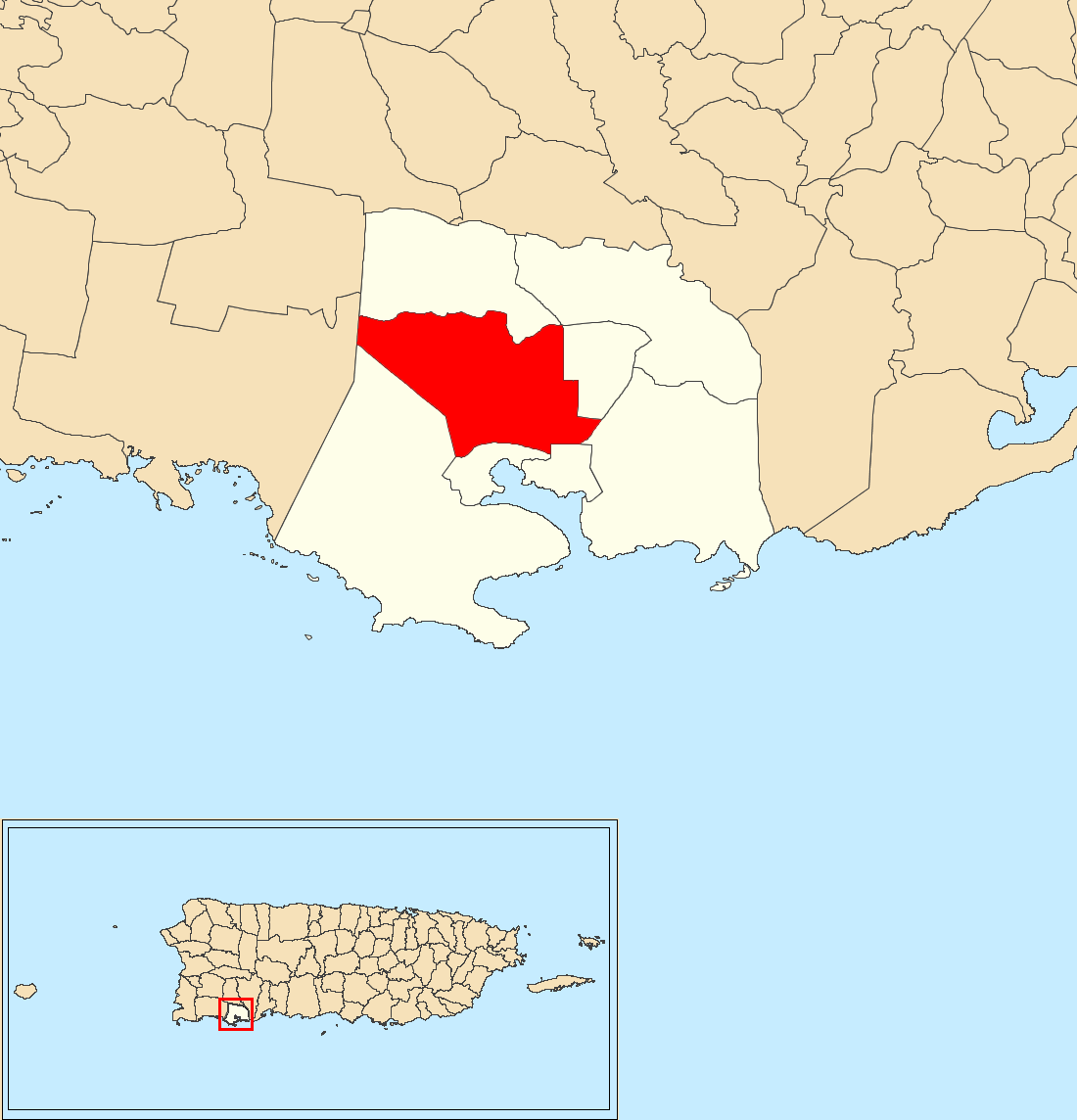
- Location of Ciénaga within the municipality of Guánica shown in red

- Location of Puerto Rico
- Coordinates: 17°59′49″N 66°56′15″W
- Commonwealth: Puerto Rico
- Municipality: Guánica

Area
  - Total: 5.72 sq mi (14.8 km^{2})
  - Land: 5.68 sq mi (14.7 km^{2})
  - Water: 0.04 sq mi (0.10 km^{2})
- Elevation: 52 ft (16 m)

Population (2010)
  - Total: 2,231
  - Density: 392.8/sq mi (151.7/km^{2})
- Source: 2010 Census
- Time zone: UTC−4 (AST)
- ZIP Code: 00653

Ciénaga is a barrio in the municipality of Guánica, Puerto Rico. Its population in 2010 was 2,231.

Historical population
| Census | Pop. | Note | %± |
|---|---|---|---|
| 1930 | 1,074 | | — |
| 1940 | 1,145 | | 6.6% |
| 1950 | 1,358 | | 18.6% |
| 1960 | 960 | | −29.3% |
| 1970 | 1,177 | | 22.6% |
| 1980 | 2,002 | | 70.1% |
| 1990 | 1,967 | | −1.7% |
| 2000 | 2,376 | | 20.8% |
| 2010 | 2,231 | | −6.1% |
U.S. Decennial Census; 1899 (shown as 1900) 1910-1930; 1930-1950 1980-2000 2010

== See also ==
- List of communities in Puerto Rico
