= Sabana Yeguas =

Barrio of Lajas, Puerto Rico

- Barrio
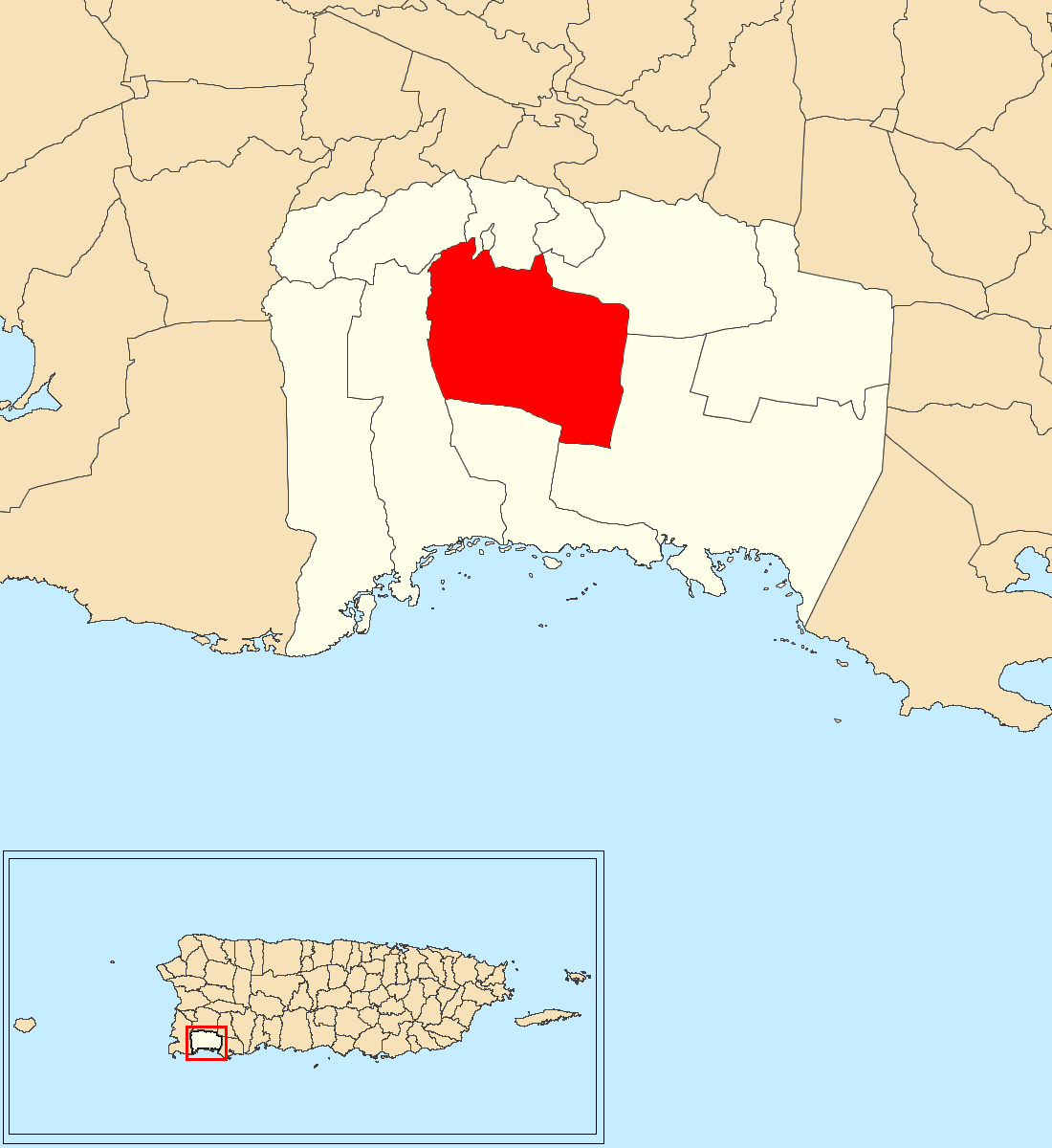
- Location of Sabana Yeguas within the municipality of Lajas shown in red

- Location of Puerto Rico
- Coordinates: 18°01′06″N 67°03′26″W
- Commonwealth: Puerto Rico
- Municipality: Lajas

Area
  - Total: 7.76 sq mi (20.1 km^{2})
  - Land: 7.75 sq mi (20.1 km^{2})
  - Water: 0.01 sq mi (0.026 km^{2})
- Elevation: 43 ft (13 m)

Population (2010)
  - Total: 2,082
  - Density: 519.2/sq mi (200.5/km^{2})
- Source: 2010 Census
- Time zone: UTC−4 (AST)

Sabana Yeguas is a barrio in the municipality of Lajas, Puerto Rico. Its population in 2010 was 2,082.

== History ==
Sabana Yeguas was in Spain's gazetteers until Puerto Rico was ceded by Spain in the aftermath of the Spanish–American War under the terms of the Treaty of Paris of 1898 and became an unincorporated territory of the United States. In 1899, the United States Department of War conducted a census of Puerto Rico finding that the population of Sabana Yeguas barrio was 938.

Historical population
| Census | Pop. | Note | %± |
|---|---|---|---|
| 1900 | 938 | | — |
| 1910 | 1,251 | | 33.4% |
| 1920 | 1,448 | | 15.7% |
| 1930 | 1,323 | | −8.6% |
| 1940 | 1,477 | | 11.6% |
| 1950 | 1,789 | | 21.1% |
| 1960 | 1,651 | | −7.7% |
| 1970 | 0 | | −100.0% |
| 1980 | 3,109 | | — |
| 1990 | 3,067 | | −1.4% |
| 2000 | 3,174 | | 3.5% |
| 2010 | 2,082 | | −34.4% |
U.S. Decennial Census; 1899 (shown as 1900) 1910-1930; 1930-1950 1980-2000 2010

== See also ==
- List of communities in Puerto Rico
