= Parguera =

Barrio of Lajas, Puerto Rico

- Barrio
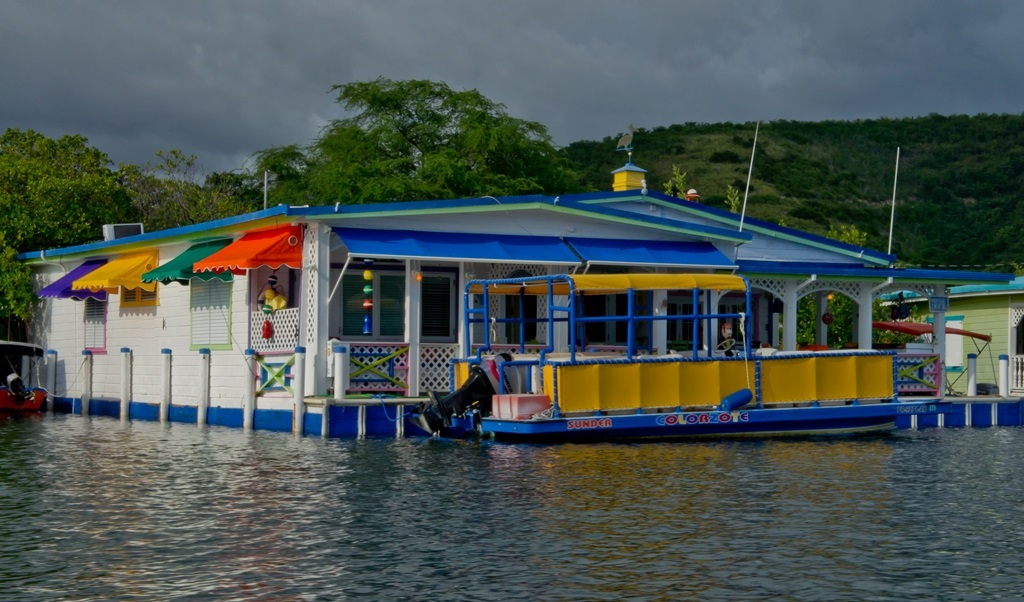
- On the water in Parguera

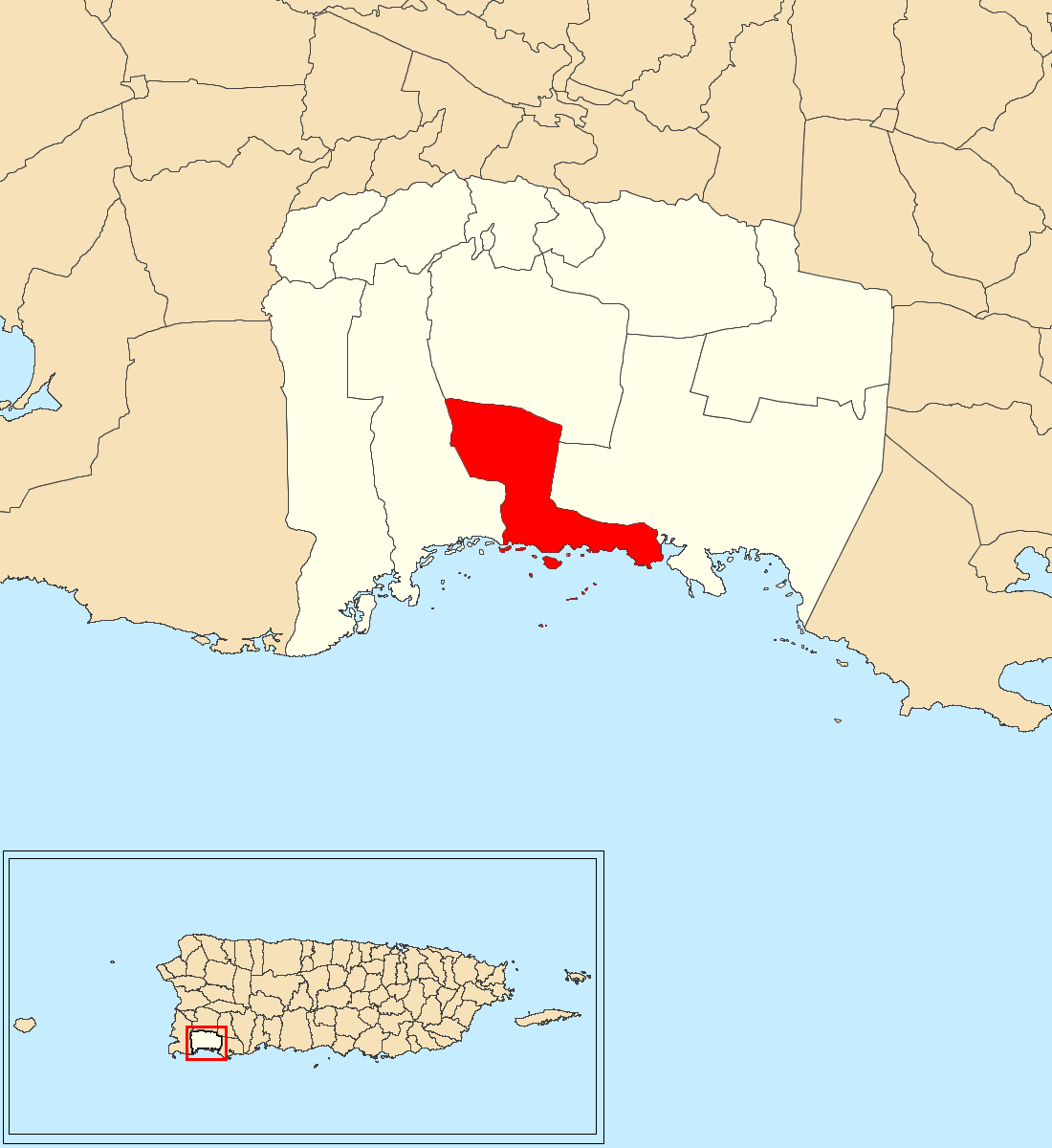
- Location of Parguera within the municipality of Lajas shown in red

- Location of Puerto Rico
- Coordinates: 17°58′33″N 67°02′31″W
- Commonwealth: Puerto Rico
- Municipality: Lajas

Area
  - Total: 7.34 sq mi (19.0 km^{2})
  - Land: 4.02 sq mi (10.4 km^{2})
  - Water: 3.32 sq mi (8.6 km^{2})
- Elevation: 36 ft (11 m)

Population (2010)
  - Total: 2,082
  - Density: 519.2/sq mi (200.5/km^{2})
- Source: 2010 Census
- Time zone: UTC−4 (AST)

Parguera is a barrio in the municipality of Lajas, Puerto Rico with a population of 2,082 in 2010. La Parguera is the main settlement of the barrio, often referred to as Poblado de la Parguera. Parguera is home to La Parguera Nature Reserve, which encompasses the bioluminescent bay, its surrounding mangrove forests, wetlands and a number of keys such as Mata La Gata and Cayo Enrique. The name Parguera derives from pargo, the local name for the Northern red snapper (Lutjanus campechanus).

== History ==
The settlement of La Parguera was established as a villa pesquera (fishing village) in 1825.

Parguera was in Spain's gazetteers until Puerto Rico was ceded by Spain in the aftermath of the Spanish–American War under the terms of the Treaty of Paris of 1898 and became an unincorporated territory of the United States. In 1899, the United States Department of War conducted a census of Puerto Rico finding that the combined population of Parguera and Costa barrios was 1,256.

Historical population
Census	Pop.	Note	%±
1910	523		—
1920	661		26.4%
1930	740		12.0%
1940	926		25.1%
1950	807		−12.9%
1960	1,030		27.6%
1970	1,224		18.8%
1980	1,677		37.0%
1990	1,796		7.1%
2000	2,071		15.3%
2010	2,082		0.5%
U.S. Decennial Census; 1900 (N/A) 1910-1930; 1930-1950 1980-2000 2010

== Features ==
Parguera barrio is mainly known for La Parguera Bio Bay, a tourist spot from where sunset and night bioluminescent tours leave regularly. Tourists go out on a kayak or small boat at night to see the bay with its bioluminescent waters, caused by microorganisms called dinoflagellate and seen when the water is disturbed at night. A parador (country inn) called Parador Villa Parguera is located in Parguera.

== Climate ==
Climate data for Parguera, Puerto Rico (1991–2020 normals, extremes 1959–present)
Month	Jan	Feb	Mar	Apr	May	Jun	Jul	Aug	Sep	Oct	Nov	Dec	Year
Record high °F (°C)	92 (33)	93 (34)	95 (35)	96 (36)	97 (36)	97 (36)	100 (38)	98 (37)	101 (38)	103 (39)	95 (35)	94 (34)	103 (39)
Mean daily maximum °F (°C)	86.0 (30.0)	85.8 (29.9)	85.7 (29.8)	86.7 (30.4)	88.2 (31.2)	89.8 (32.1)	90.4 (32.4)	90.6 (32.6)	90.5 (32.5)	90.0 (32.2)	88.3 (31.3)	87.5 (30.8)	88.3 (31.3)
Daily mean °F (°C)	78.0 (25.6)	77.6 (25.3)	78.0 (25.6)	79.6 (26.4)	81.5 (27.5)	83.1 (28.4)	83.2 (28.4)	83.1 (28.4)	83.3 (28.5)	82.4 (28.0)	80.7 (27.1)	78.8 (26.0)	80.8 (27.1)
Mean daily minimum °F (°C)	70.0 (21.1)	69.4 (20.8)	70.3 (21.3)	72.4 (22.4)	74.8 (23.8)	76.3 (24.6)	75.9 (24.4)	75.6 (24.2)	76.1 (24.5)	74.9 (23.8)	73.0 (22.8)	70.0 (21.1)	73.2 (22.9)
Record low °F (°C)	60 (16)	50 (10)	60 (16)	58 (14)	59 (15)	67 (19)	66 (19)	62 (17)	61 (16)	66 (19)	62 (17)	60 (16)	50 (10)
Average precipitation inches (mm)	1.93 (49)	1.86 (47)	2.71 (69)	3.57 (91)	4.07 (103)	2.54 (65)	2.67 (68)	4.32 (110)	5.53 (140)	6.26 (159)	5.06 (129)	1.96 (50)	42.48 (1,079)
Source: NOAA

== Gallery ==
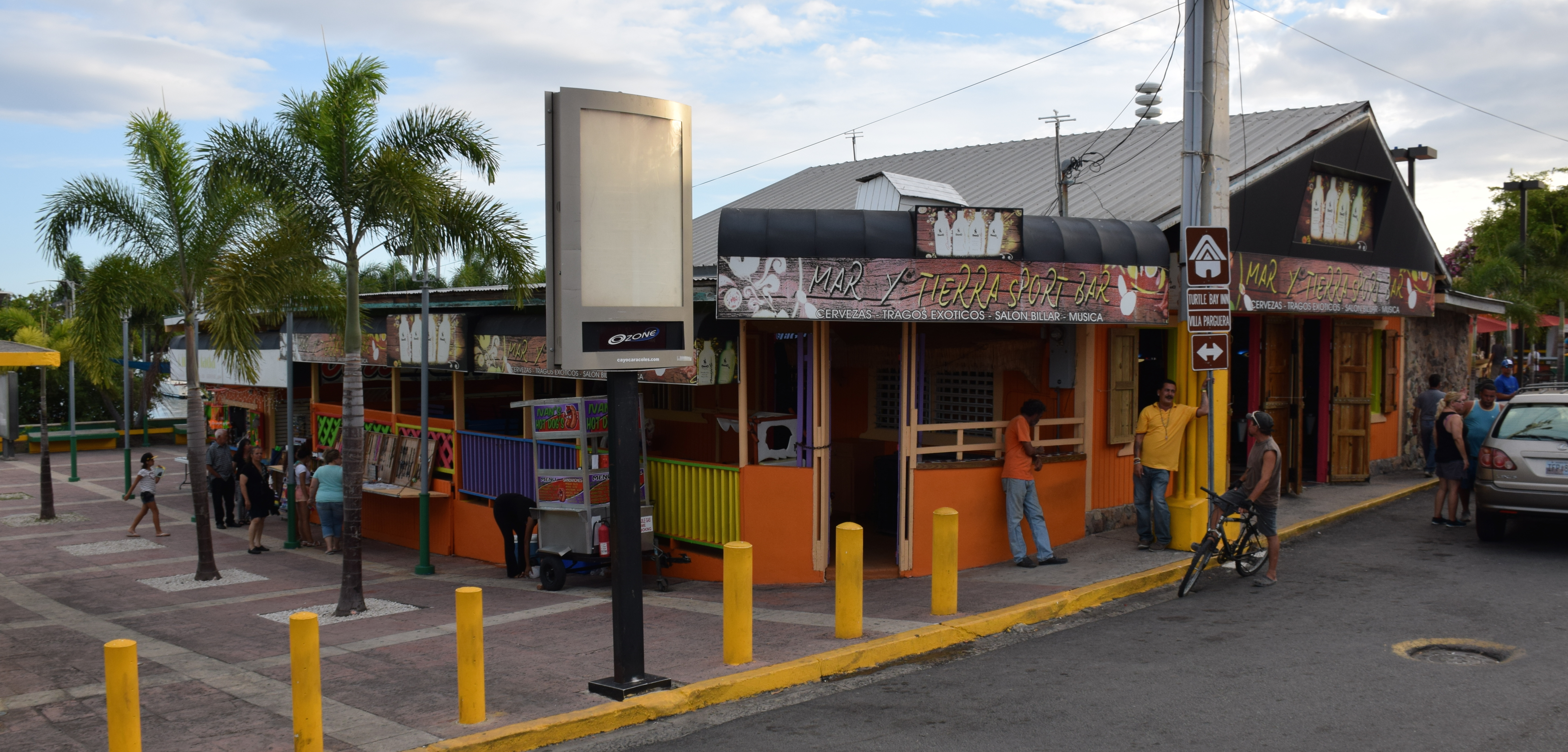
Near Bioluminescent Tour and Parador Villa Parquera

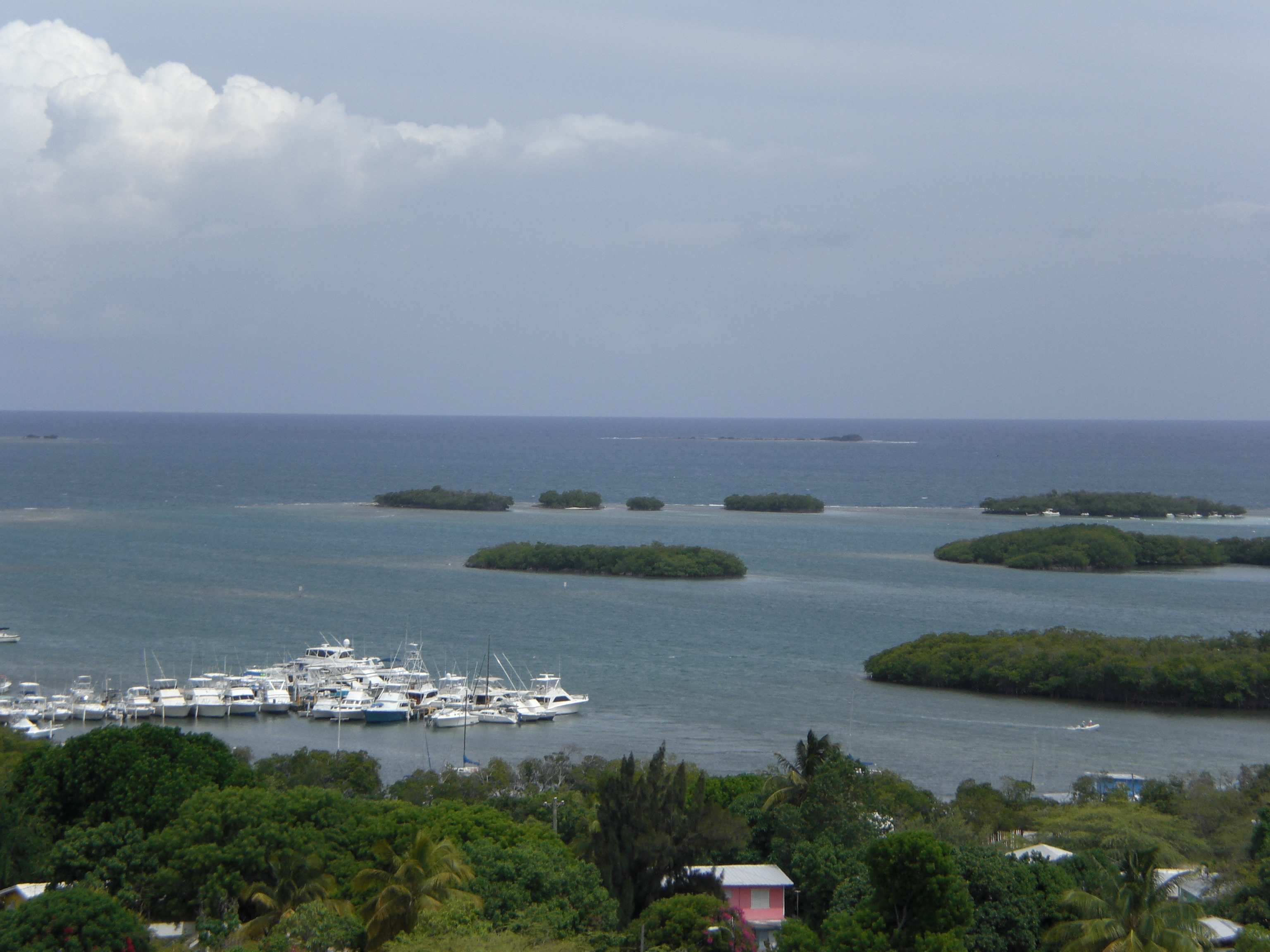
Cays of La Parquera

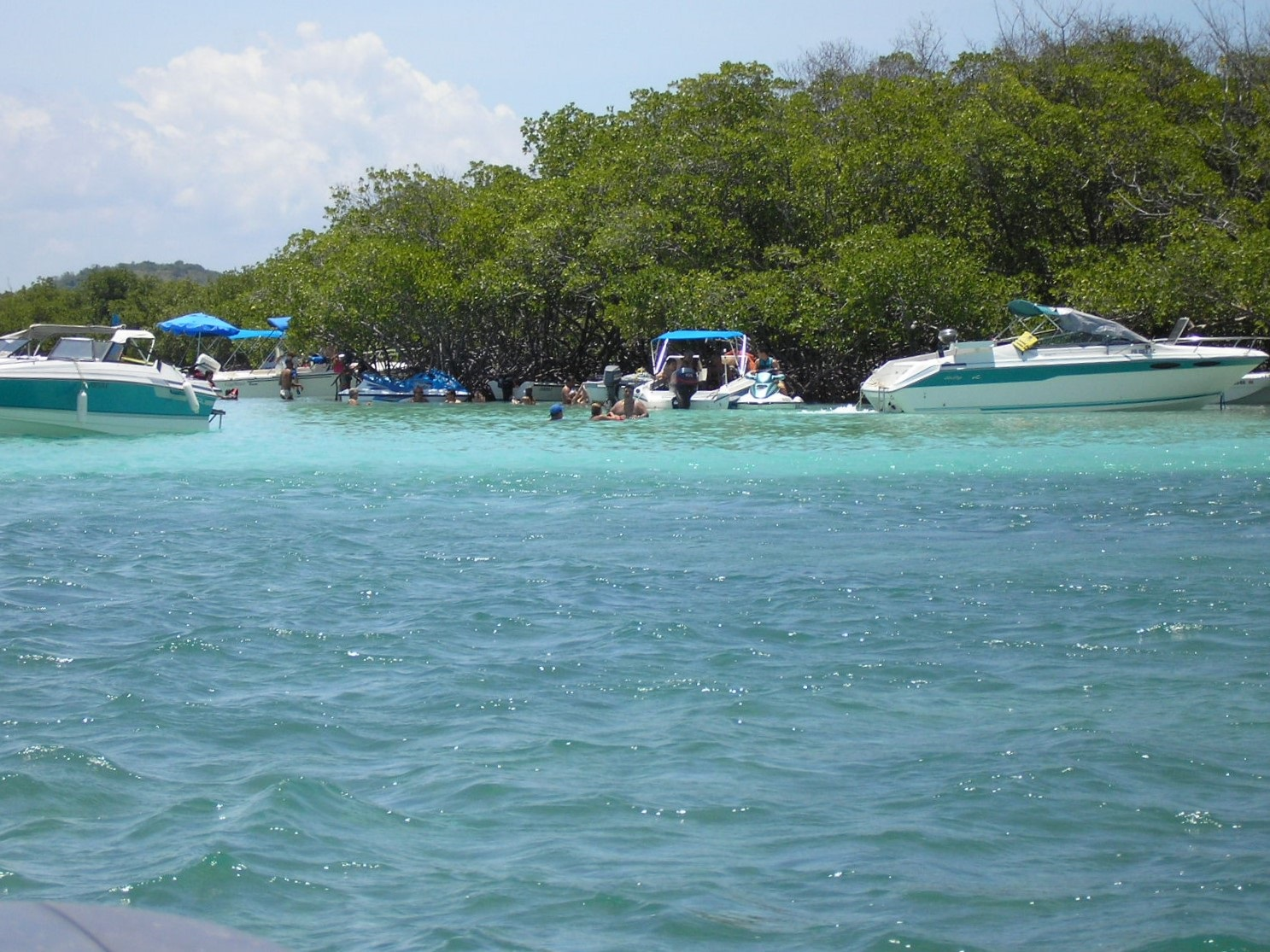
Boats in the Caribbean Sea in Lajas

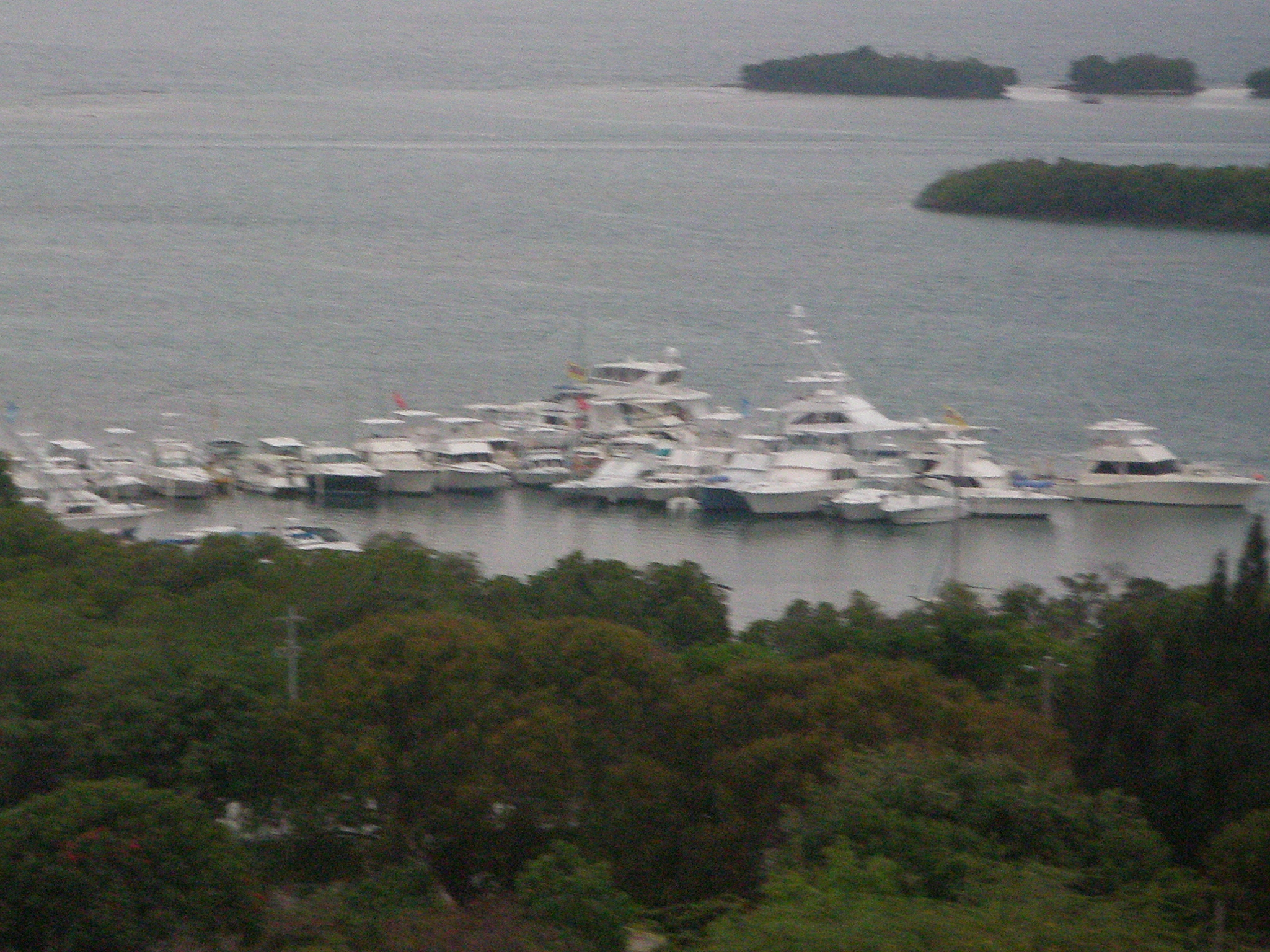
Boats at La Parguera

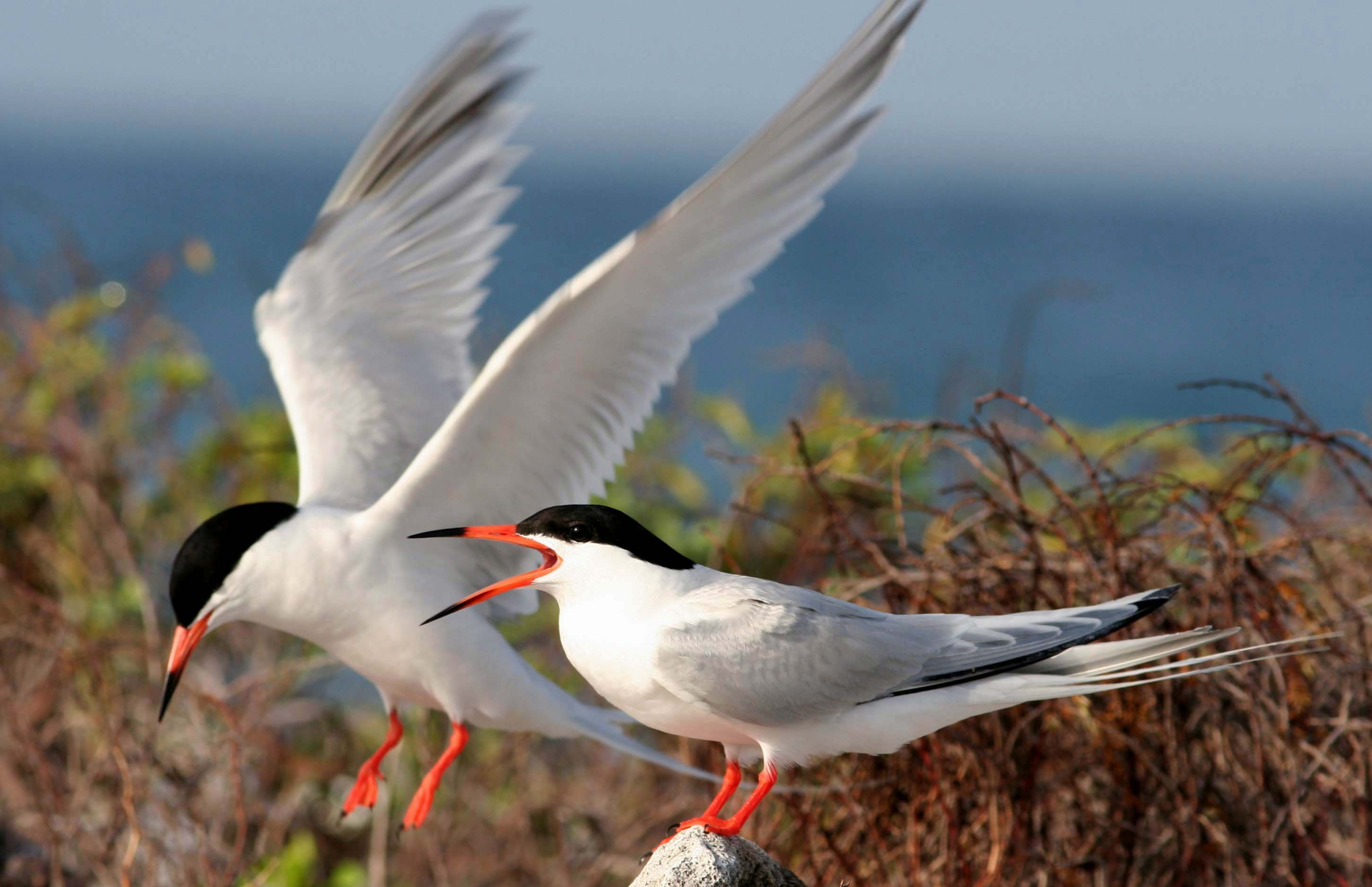
Roseate tern at La Parguera, (on the list of threatened species)

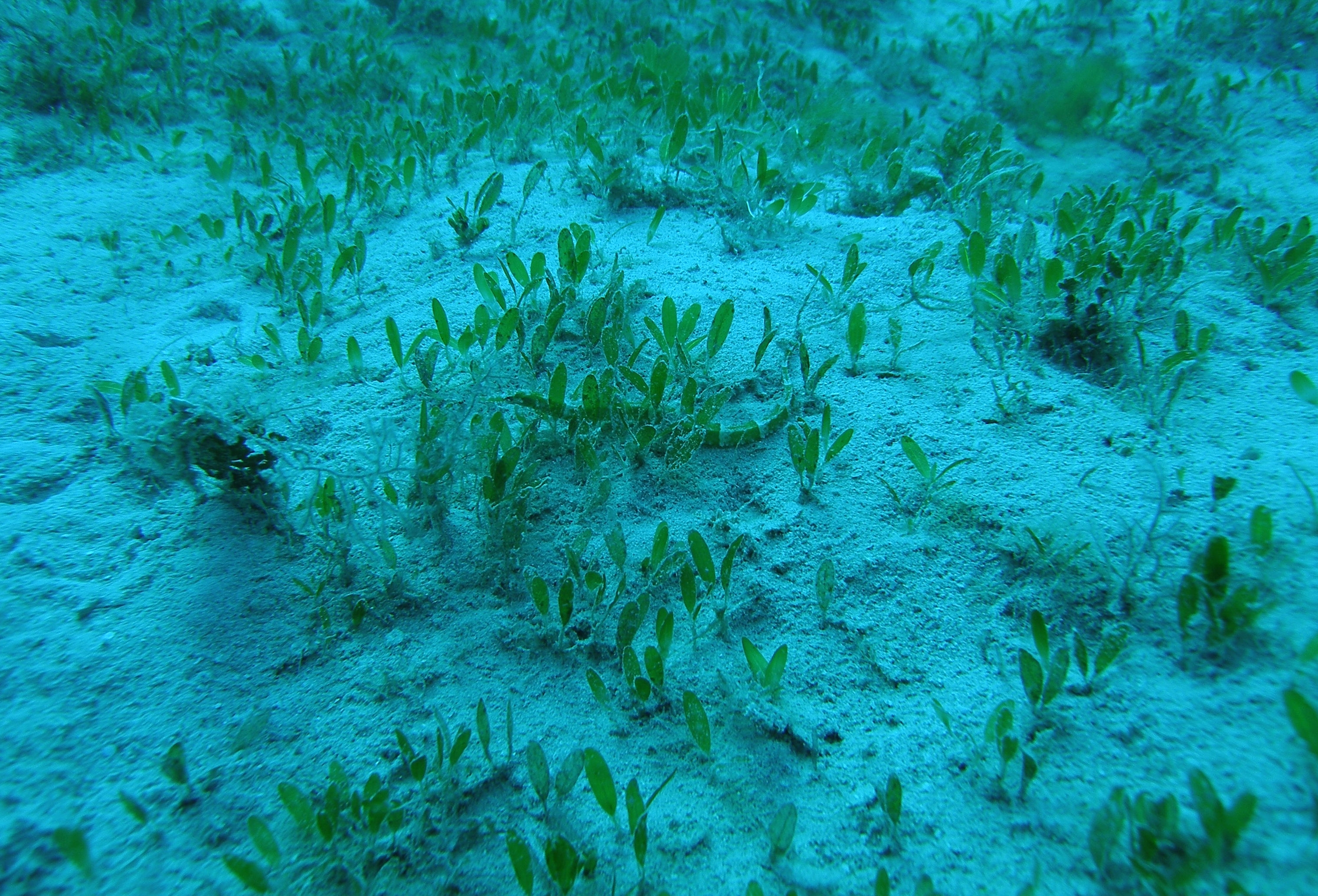
Pipefish camouflaged in Caribbean seagrass in La Parguera

== See also ==
- List of communities in Puerto Rico
