= Puerto Rico Highway 103 =

Highway in Puerto Rico

Highway 103
- Ruta 103

Route information
- Maintained by Puerto Rico DTPW
- Length: 13.0 km (8.1 mi)
- Existed: 1953–present

Major junctions
- South end: PR-101 in Llanos Costa–Llanos Tuna–Boquerón
- PR-300 in Boquerón–Llanos Tuna; PR-308 in Monte Grande–Miradero–Pedernales; PR-102 in Cabo Rojo barrio-pueblo; PR-102 in Monte Grande–Bajura; PR-3311 in Guanajibo
- North end: PR-114 in Guanajibo

Location
- Country: United States
- Territory: Puerto Rico
- Municipalities: Cabo Rojo

Highway system
- Roads in Puerto Rico; List
← PR-102	→ PR-104

Puerto Rico Highway 103 (PR-103) is a rural road that extends from PR-114 near Hormigueros to PR-101 in Cabo Rojo. Previously ran through downtown Hormigueros, from PR-2 and PR-309 intersection between Guanajibo and Hormigueros barrios to PR-2 and PR-319 junction in downtown area.

== Route description ==
The current PR-103 extends from PR-114 in Guanajibo to PR-101 between the Llanos Costa, Llanos Tuna, and Boquerón barrios. Along its north-south route, it intersects with PR-3311, PR-102, PR-308 and PR-300. Among the barrios it passes through are Bajura, Monte Grande, Cabo Rojo barrio-pueblo, Miradero and Pedernales.

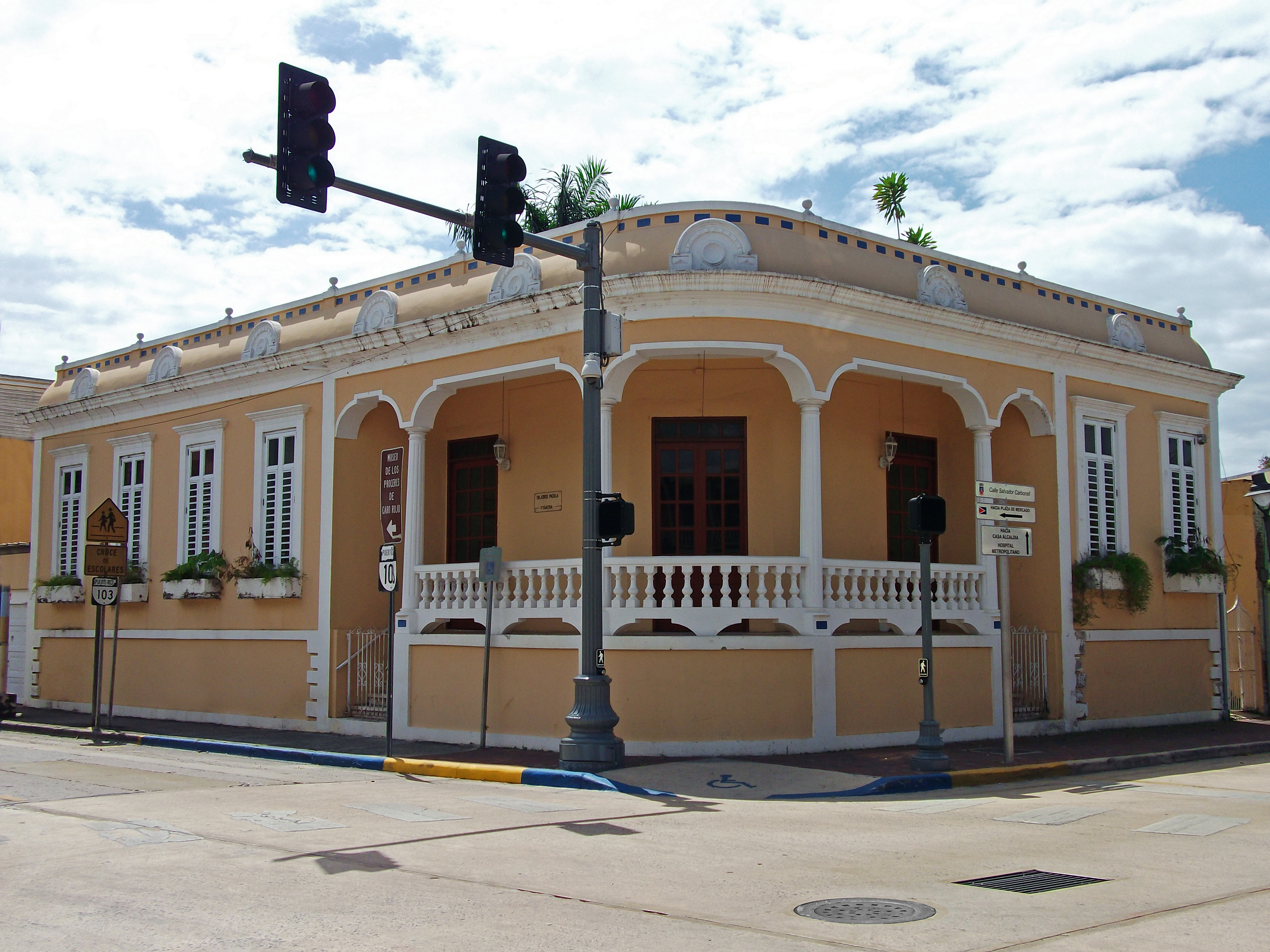
An old house located at the intersection of PR-102 and PR-103 in downtown Cabo Rojo

== History ==
PR-103 is the old road that ran from Hormigueros, passing through the center of Cabo Rojo, until PR-101, which connects from Boquerón to Lajas. It now extends only from PR-114 to PR-101, staying within Cabo Rojo. Due to the rural nature of PR-103, Puerto Rico Highway 100 has replaced PR-103 as a faster and more convenient route to enter and exit Cabo Rojo from the north.

== Major intersections ==
The entire route is located in Cabo Rojo.

Location	km	mi	Destinations	Notes
Llanos Costa–Llanos Tuna– Boquerón tripoint	13.0	8.1	PR-101 – Boquerón, Lajas	Southern terminus of PR-103
Boquerón–Llanos Tuna line	10.5	6.5	PR-300 – Llanos Tuna	
Monte Grande–Pedernales line	8.2	5.1	To PR-100 (Avenida Antonio J. "Tony" Fas Alzamora) / PR-Camino Vicente Torres – Cabo Rojo	
Monte Grande–Miradero– Pedernales tripoint	6.0– 5.9	3.7– 3.7	PR-308 (Avenida Don Santos Ortiz Montalvo) – Puerto Real	
Cabo Rojo barrio-pueblo	5.5	3.4	To PR-312 / PR-313 / PR-Calle Mariano Quiñones – Monte Grande	One-way street
Cabo Rojo barrio-pueblo	5.2 20.4 (Note: Kilometer markers represent the distance along PR-102 rather than PR-103.)	3.2 12.7	PR-102 west (Calle Doctor Salvador Carbonell) – Mayagüez	Western terminus of PR-102 concurrency
Monte Grande–Bajura line	21.3 5.1	13.2 3.2	PR-102 east (Avenida Juan Pabón Avilés) – San Germán	Eastern terminus of PR-102 concurrency
Guanajibo	0.6	0.37	PR-3311 – Guanajibo	
Guanajibo	0.0	0.0	PR-114 – Mayagüez, Hormigueros, San Germán	Northern terminus of PR-103
1.000 mi = 1.609 km; 1.000 km = 0.621 mi: Concurrency terminus

== See also ==
- 1953 Puerto Rico highway renumbering
