= Puerto Rico Highway 114 =

Highway in Puerto Rico

Highway 114
- Ruta 114

Route information
- Maintained by Puerto Rico DTPW
- Length: 14.7 km (9.1 mi)

Major junctions
- West end: PR-2 / PR-239 in Sábalos
- PR-343 in Guanajibo; PR-100 in Guanajibo; PR-309 in Guanajibo; PR-311 in Guanajibo; PR-103 in Guanajibo; PR-319 in Benavente; PR-317 in Sabana Grande Abajo–Sabana Eneas–Maresúa
- East end: PR-102 in Maresúa–Sabana Grande Abajo

Location
- Country: United States
- Territory: Puerto Rico
- Municipalities: Mayagüez, Hormigueros, Cabo Rojo, San Germán

Highway system
- Roads in Puerto Rico; List
← PR-113	→ PR-115

Puerto Rico Highway 114 (PR-114) is a rural road that travels from Mayagüez to San Germán. PR-114 begins at the intersection of PR-2 and Avenida los Corazones in Mayagüez and ends at the intersection with PR-102 at the entrance to the center of San Germán. This road passes through the municipalities of Hormigueros and Cabo Rojo before coming to San Germán.

It is a fairly straight road, but is often flooded during periods of heavy rain due to poor drainage and its location near the Guanajibo River.

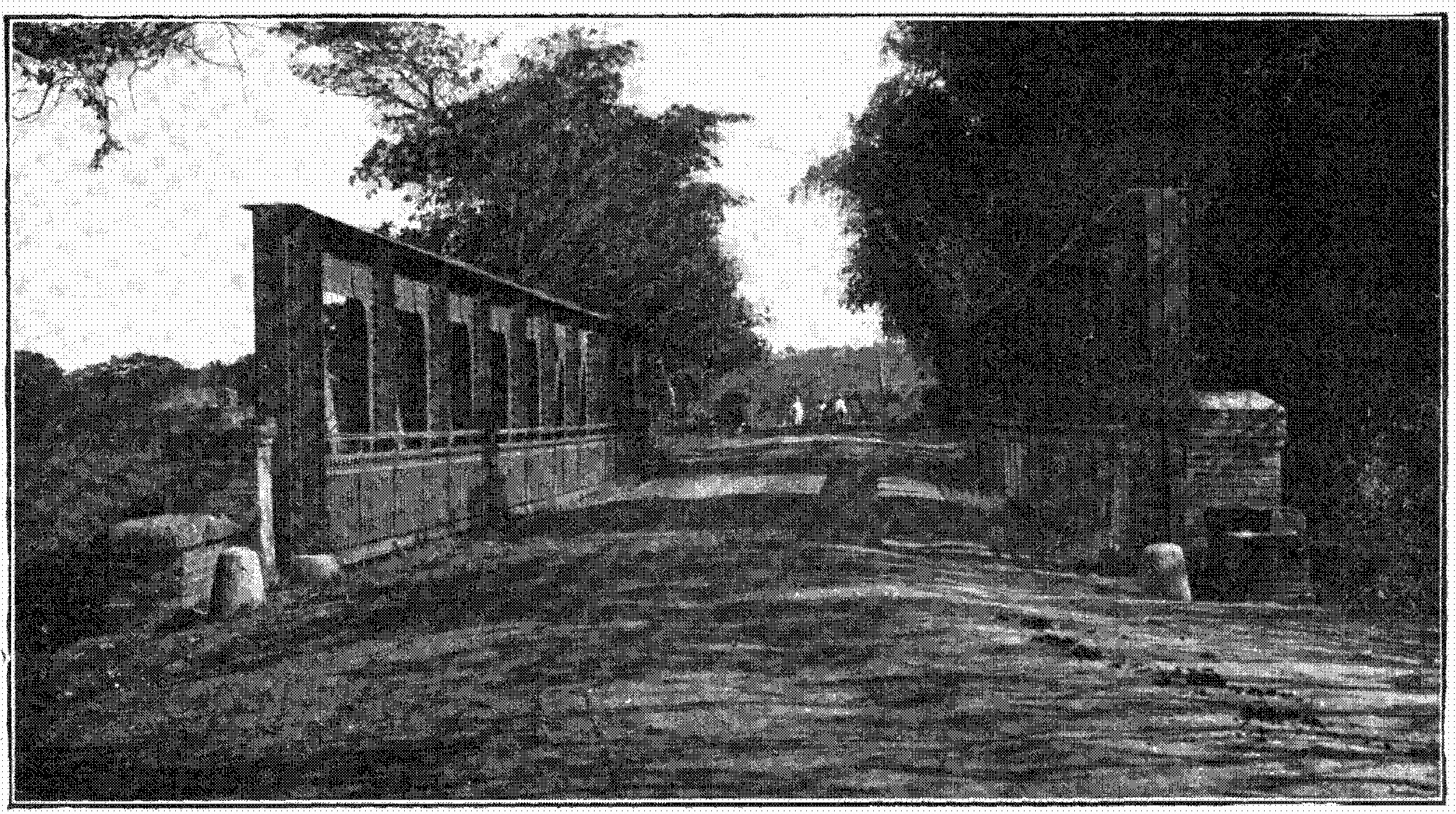
Silva Bridge is at kilometer 4 on Highway 114 (photographed c. 1898 during the Spanish-American War)

== Major intersections ==
Municipality	Location	km	mi	Destinations	Notes
Mayagüez	Sábalos	0.0	0.0	PR-239 north (Calle Ramón Emeterio Betances) – Mayagüez	Continuation beyond PR-2
Mayagüez	Sábalos	0.0	0.0	PR-2 (Expreso Eugenio María de Hostos) – Aguadilla, Ponce	Western terminus of PR-114 and southern terminus of PR-239
Hormigueros	Guanajibo	2.3	1.4	PR-343 east to PR-2 – Hormigueros, Mayagüez	
Hormigueros	Guanajibo	3.6	2.2	PR-100 north (Avenida Antonio J. "Tony" Fas Alzamora) – Hormigueros, Mayagüez	Incomplete diamond interchange; no access to PR-100 southbound; no access from PR-100
Hormigueros	Guanajibo	3.7	2.3	PR-309 – Hormigueros	
Río Guanajibo		4.0	2.5	Puente Silva	
Cabo Rojo	Guanajibo	4.2	2.6	PR-311 – Cabo Rojo	
Cabo Rojo	Guanajibo	5.4– 5.5	3.4– 3.4	PR-103 – Cabo Rojo	
Hormigueros	Benavente	7.0	4.3	PR-319 north – Hormigueros	
Río Guanajibo		10.1	6.3	Puente Pezuela	
Cabo Rojo	No major junctions				
San Germán	Sabana Grande Abajo–Sabana Eneas– Maresúa tripoint	12.7	7.9	PR-317 – Sabana Eneas, Maresúa	
San Germán	Maresúa–Sabana Grande Abajo line	14.7	9.1	PR-102 – San Germán, Cabo Rojo	Eastern terminus of PR-114
1.000 mi = 1.609 km; 1.000 km = 0.621 mi: Incomplete access
