= Guanajibo =

Guanajibo may refer to:

== Places ==
- Guanajibo, Cabo Rojo, Puerto Rico, a barrio
- Guanajibo, Hormigueros, Puerto Rico, a barrio
- Guanajibo, Mayagüez, Puerto Rico, a barrio
