= Ancones =

Ancones may refer to:

== Places ==
- Ancones, Arroyo, Puerto Rico, a barrio
- Ancones, San Germán, Puerto Rico, a barrio
