= Silva Bridge =

Historic bridge in Hormigueros and Cabo Rojo municipalities, Puerto Rico

- U.S. National Register of Historic Places
- Puerto Rico Historic Sites and Zones
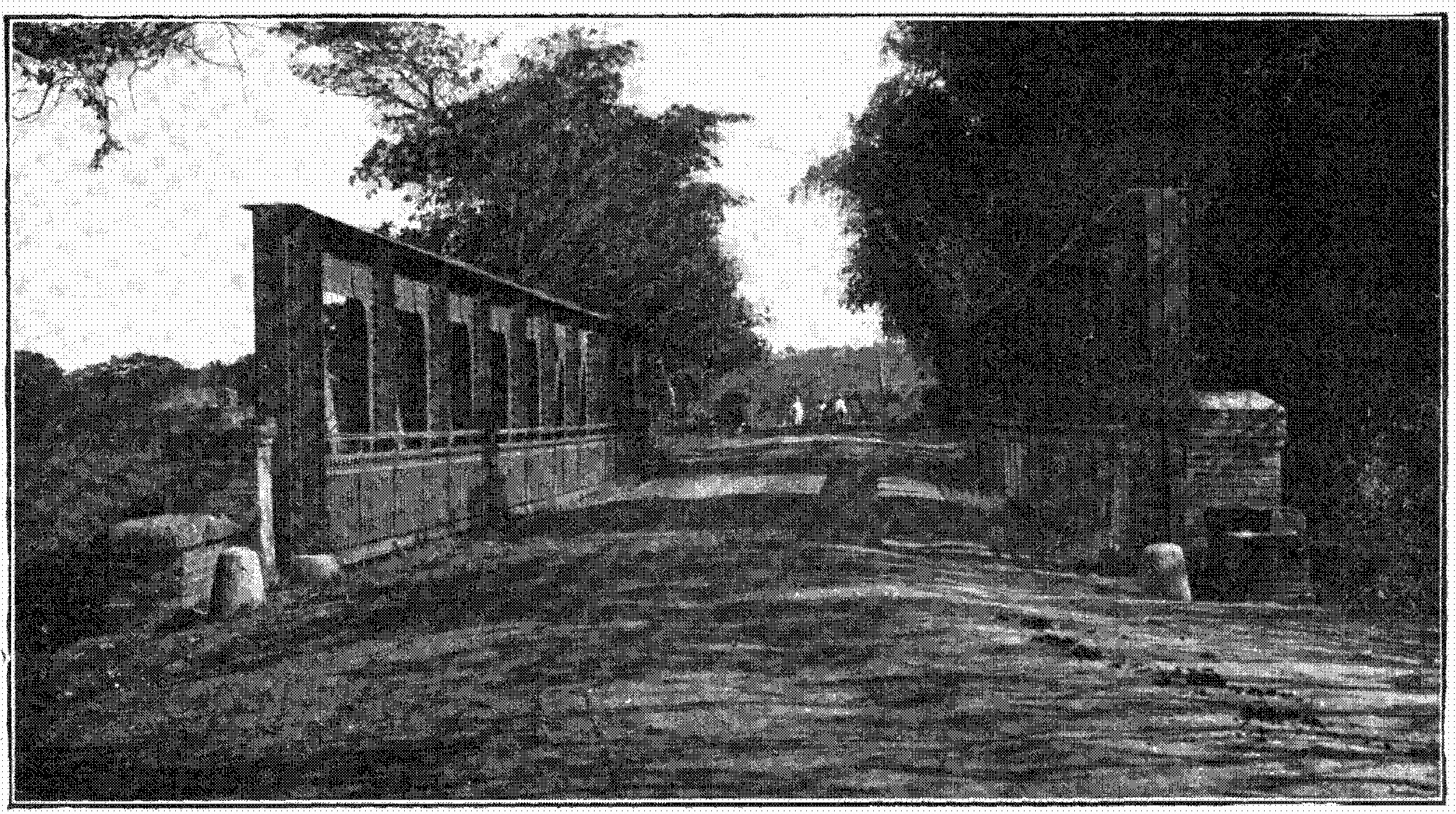
- Silva Bridge

- Location within Puerto Rico
- Location: Highway 114, km 4, near Hormigueros, Puerto Rico
- Coordinates: 18.139281°N 67.145699°W
- Area: less than one acre
- Built: 1897
- Architectural style: Pratt pony truss
- MPS: Historic Bridges of Puerto Rico MPS
- NRHP reference No.: 95000834
- RNSZH No.: 2000-(RO)-19-JP-SH

Significant dates
- Added to NRHP: July 19, 1995
- Designated RNSZH: December 21, 2000

The Silva Bridge is a Pratt pony truss bridge in Puerto Rico which was built in 1897. It was listed on the National Register of Historic Places in 1995 and on the Puerto Rico Register of Historic Sites and Zones in 2000.

The Silva Bridge spans the Guanajibo River, the boundary between Guanajibo barrio in Hormigueros and Guanajibo barrio in Cabo Rojo. It is on Highway 114 at kilometer 4.

It was built in the year before the Spanish–American War, and was the site of conflict between Spanish forces and the Americans, who invaded Puerto Rico on July 25, 1898. Sniper fire held up American forces under Brigadier General Theodore Schwan who were seeking to go west across the bridge on August 10, 1898, delaying them by about two hours. The snipers were Spanish regulars and Puerto Rican volunteers.

It is Bridge No. 71 mentioned in a review of historic bridges in Puerto Rico. It is a Pratt pony truss bridge built over the River in 1897.
