= Guanajibo, Mayagüez, Puerto Rico =

Barrio of Puerto Rico

Guanajibo
- Barrio
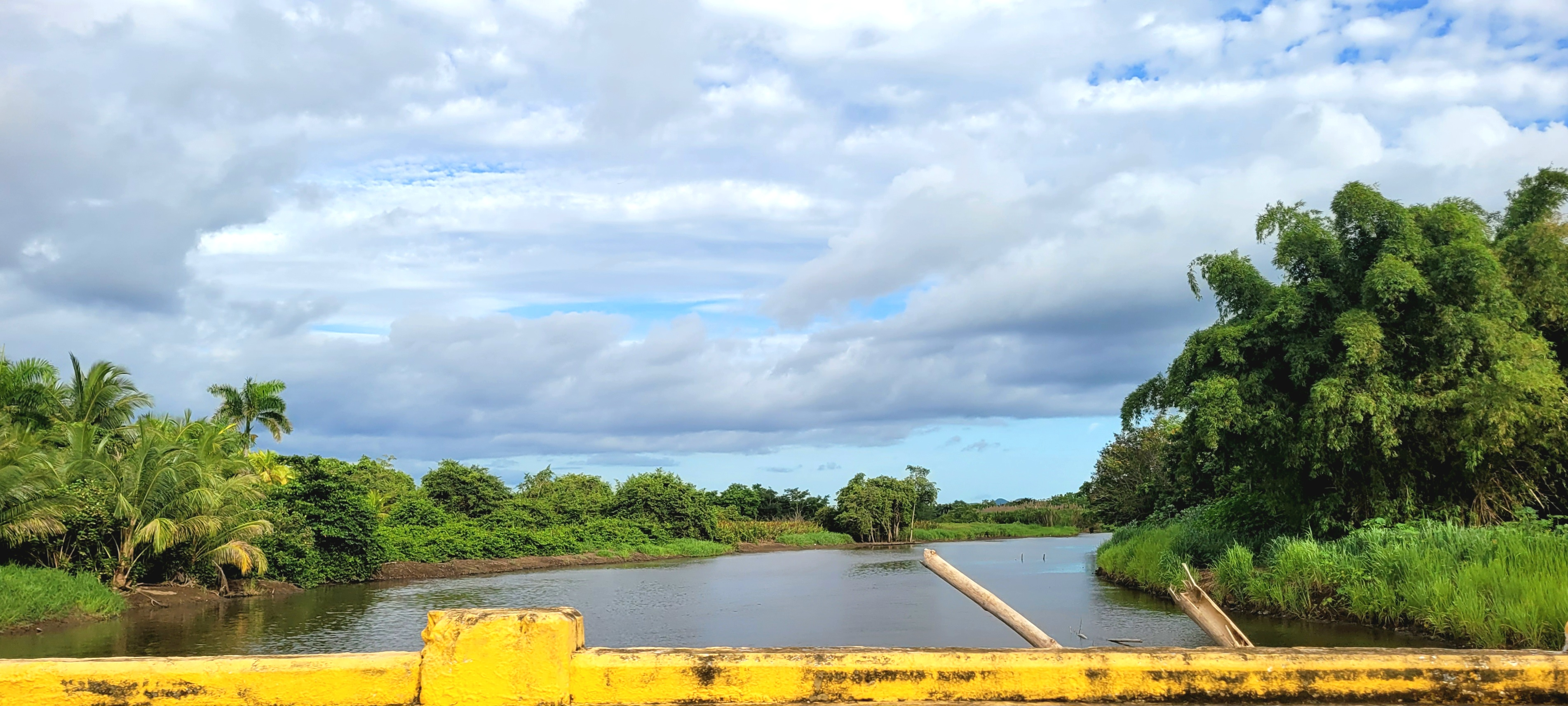
- Guanajibo River between Cabo Rojo and Mayagüez

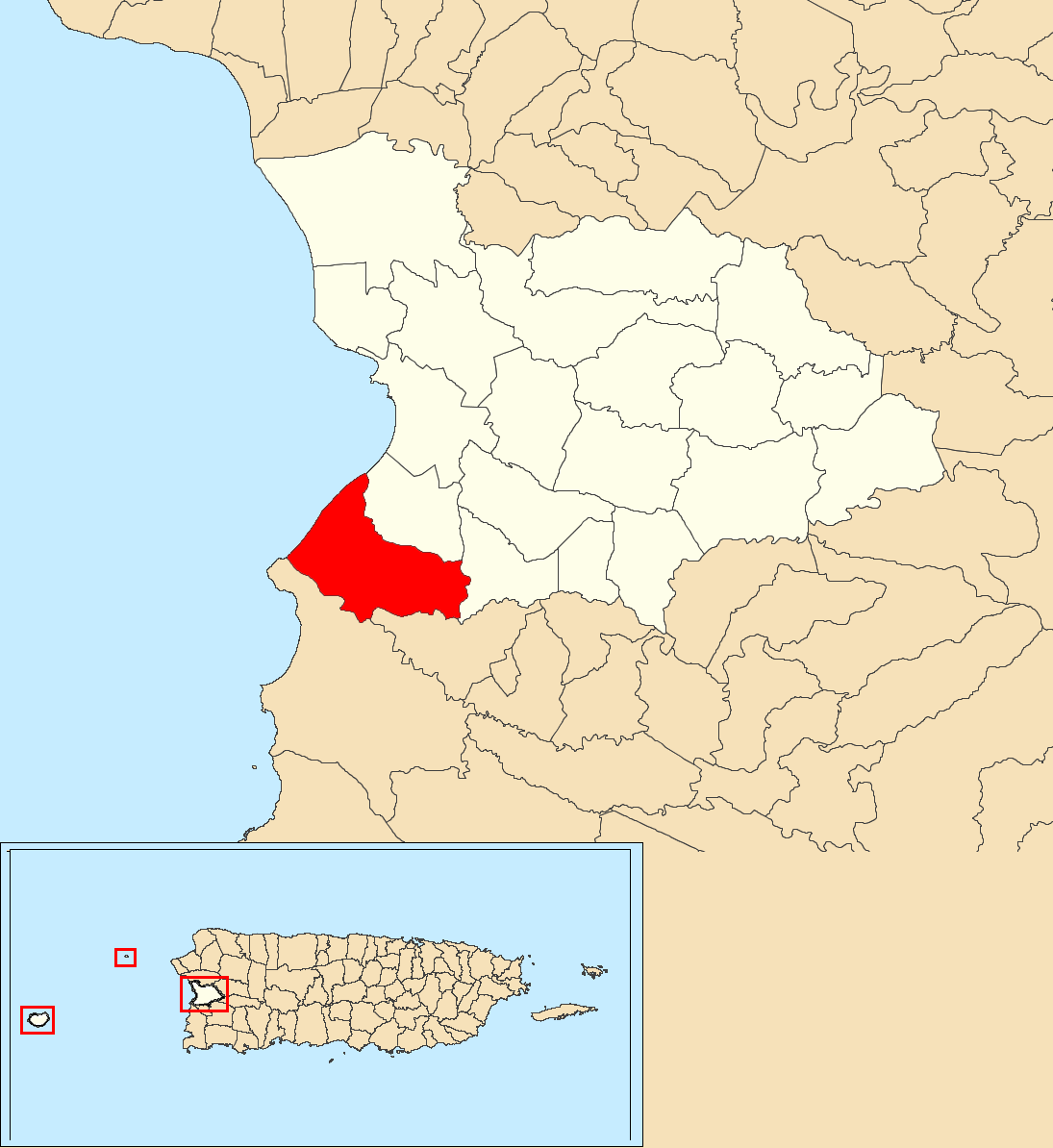
- Location of Guanajibo within the municipality of Mayagüez shown in red

- Location of Puerto Rico
- Coordinates: 18°09′52″N 67°09′38″W
- Commonwealth: Puerto Rico
- Municipality: Mayagüez

Area
  - Total: 4.19 sq mi (10.9 km^{2})
  - Land: 3.54 sq mi (9.2 km^{2})
  - Water: 0.65 sq mi (1.7 km^{2})
- Elevation: 7 ft (2.1 m)

Population (2010)
  - Total: 6,029
  - Density: 1,703.1/sq mi (657.6/km^{2})
- Source: 2010 Census
- Time zone: UTC−4 (AST)

Guanajibo is a barrio in the municipality of Mayagüez, Puerto Rico. Its population in 2010 was 6,029.

== History ==
Guanajibo was in Spain's gazetteers until Puerto Rico was ceded by Spain in the aftermath of the Spanish–American War under the terms of the Treaty of Paris of 1898 and became an unincorporated territory of the United States. In 1899, the United States Department of War conducted a census of Puerto Rico finding that the population of Guanajibo barrio was 1,032.

Historical population
Census	Pop.	Note	%±
1900	1,032		—
1910	809		−21.6%
1920	968		19.7%
1930	1,078		11.4%
1940	950		−11.9%
1950	1,751		84.3%
1960	2,392		36.6%
1970	3,764		57.4%
1980	7,257		92.8%
1990	7,862		8.3%
2000	7,165		−8.9%
2010	6,029		−15.9%
U.S. Decennial Census; 1899 (shown as 1900) 1910-1930; 1930-1950 1980-2000 2010

== See also ==
- List of communities in Puerto Rico
