= Pedernales, Cabo Rojo, Puerto Rico =

Barrio of Puerto Rico

Pedernales
- Barrio
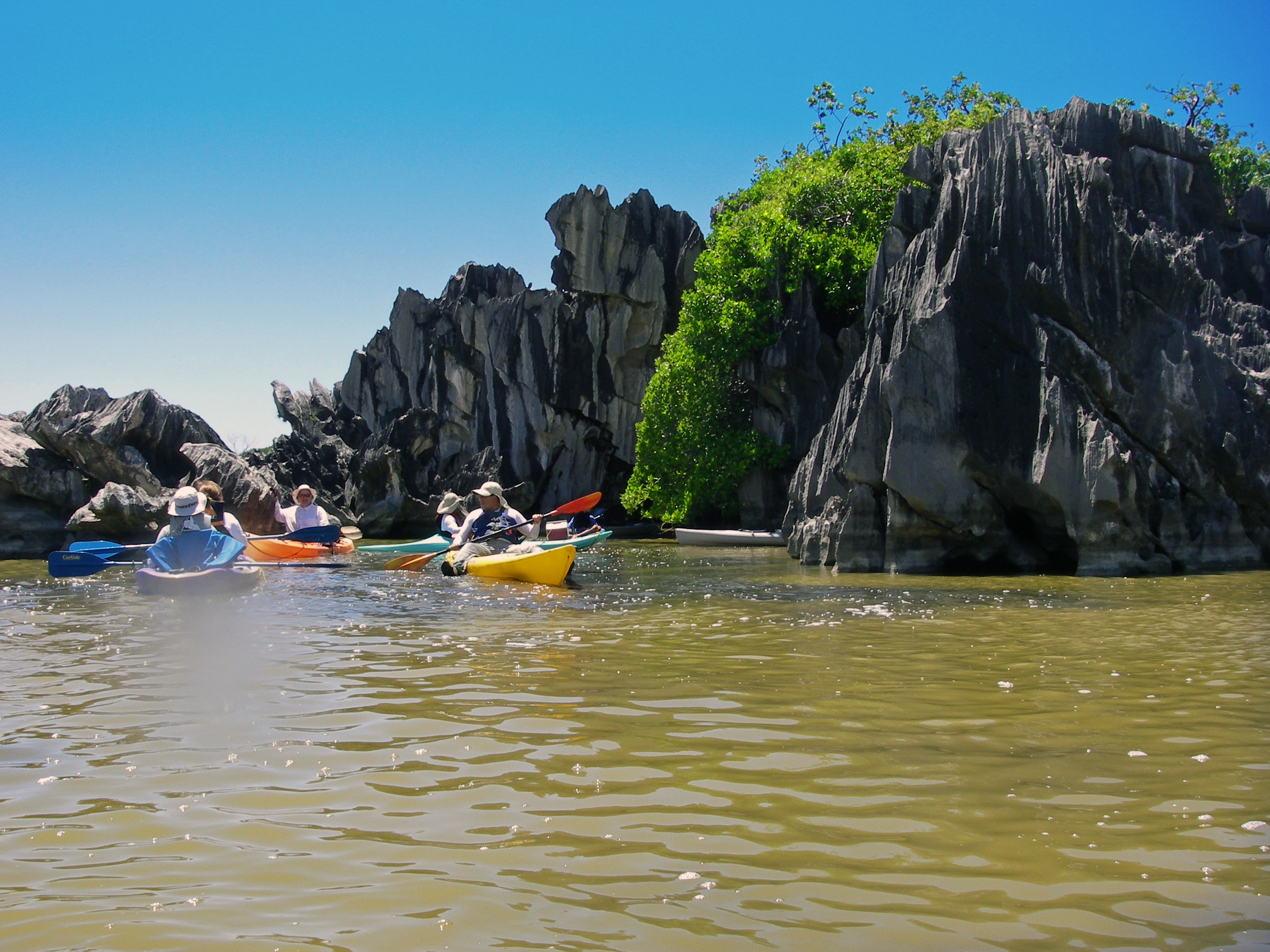
- Boulders in Laguna Guaniquilla

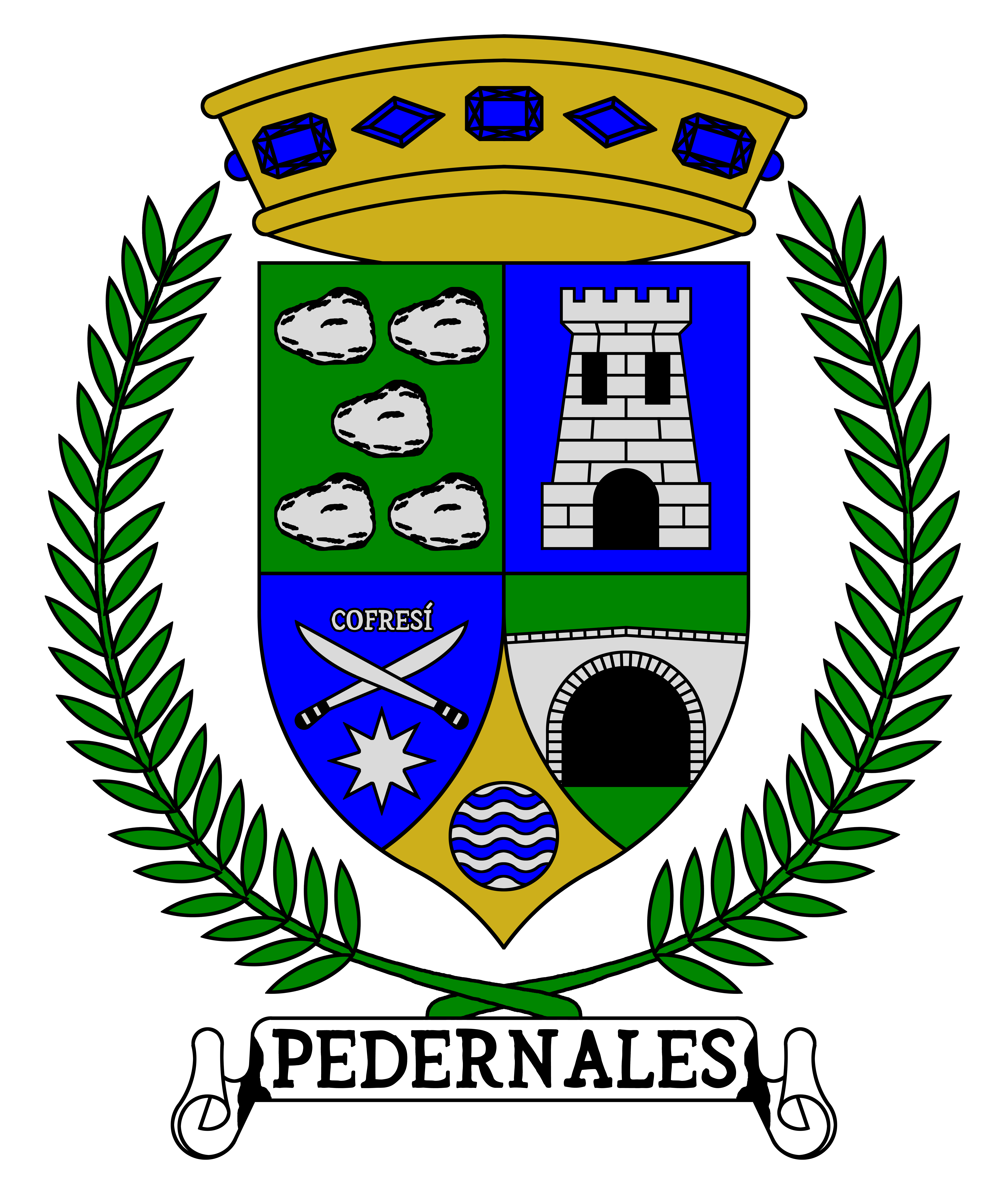
- Flag Seal

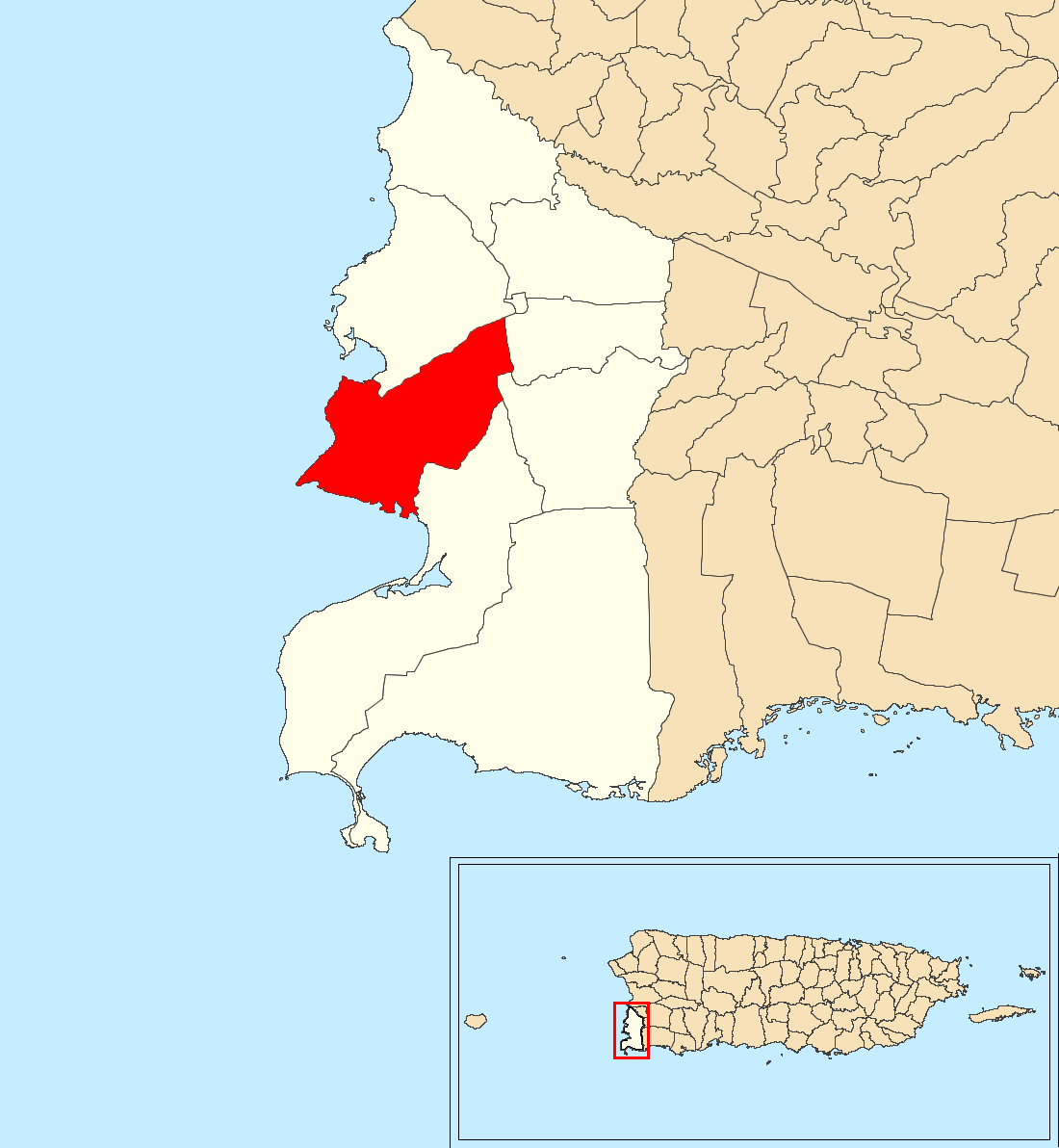
- Location of Pedernales within the municipality of Cabo Rojo shown in red

- Location of Puerto Rico
- Coordinates: 18°03′03″N 67°10′34″W
- Commonwealth: Puerto Rico
- Municipality: Cabo Rojo

Area
  - Total: 9.09 sq mi (23.5 km^{2})
  - Land: 7.44 sq mi (19.3 km^{2})
  - Water: 1.65 sq mi (4.3 km^{2})
- Elevation: 89 ft (27 m)

Population (2010)
  - Total: 4,636
  - Density: 623.1/sq mi (240.6/km^{2})
- Source: 2010 Census
- Time zone: UTC−4 (AST)
- ZIP code: 00623

Pedernales is a barrio in the municipality of Cabo Rojo, Puerto Rico. Its population in 2010 was 4,636.

== History ==
Pedernales was in Spain's gazetteers until Puerto Rico was ceded by Spain in the aftermath of the Spanish–American War under the terms of the Treaty of Paris of 1898 and became an unincorporated territory of the United States. In 1899, the United States Department of War conducted a census of Puerto Rico finding that the population of Pedernales barrio was 2,060.

Historical population
Census	Pop.	Note	%±
1900	2,060		—
1910	2,332		13.2%
1920	2,941		26.1%
1930	2,689		−8.6%
1940	2,988		11.1%
1950	2,777		−7.1%
1960	2,058		−25.9%
1970	0		−100.0%
1980	3,218		—
1990	3,896		21.1%
2000	4,809		23.4%
2010	4,636		−3.6%
U.S. Decennial Census; 1899 (shown as 1900) 1910-1930; 1930-1950 1980-2000 2010

== Features ==
Natural Reserve Guaniquilla is located in Pedernales. The boulders in the Guaniquilla Lagoon also in Pedernales, date back 11,000,000 years.

== Gallery ==
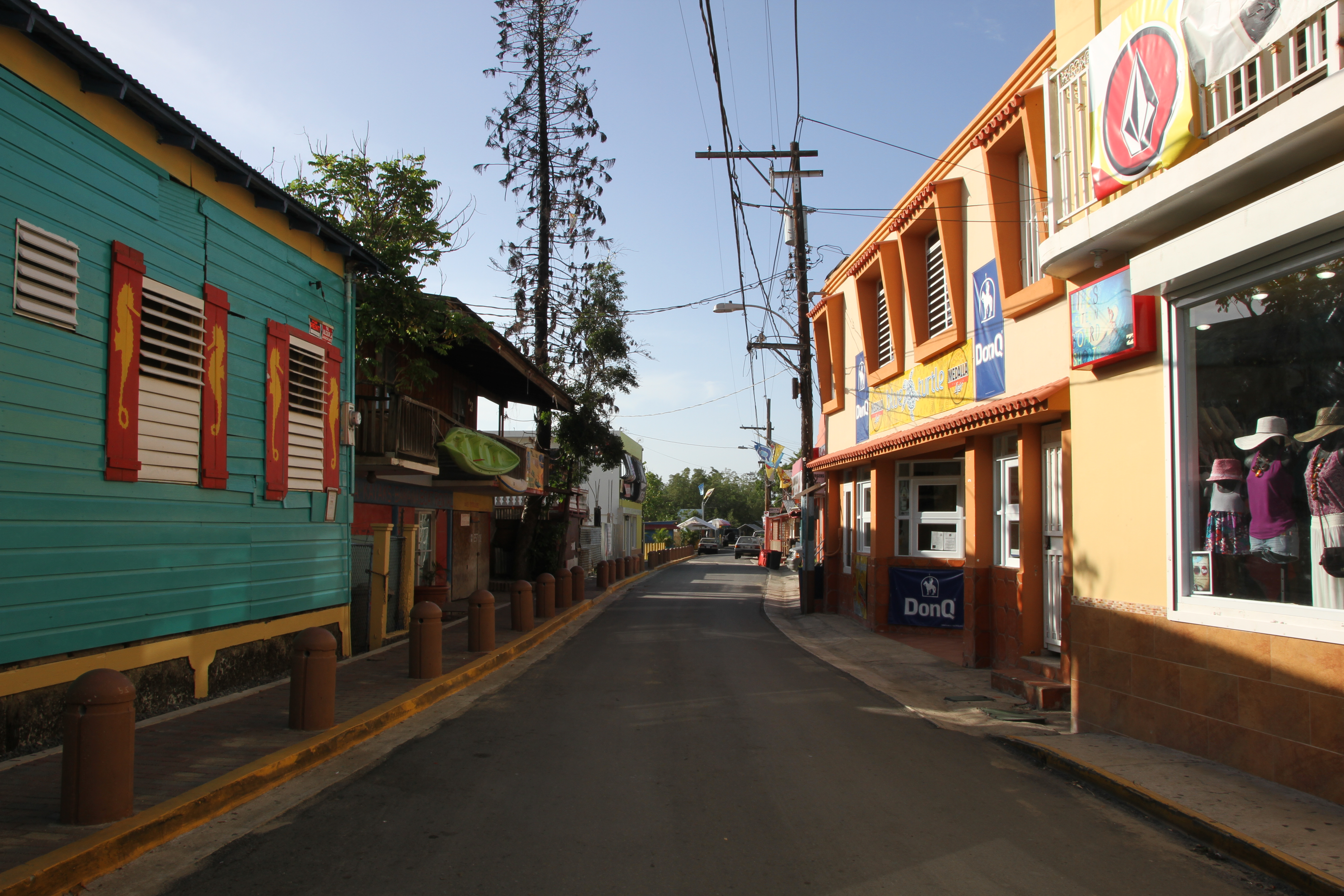
Shops in Pedernales, near Boquerón

== See also ==
- List of communities in Puerto Rico
