= Llanos Costa, Cabo Rojo, Puerto Rico =

Barrio of Puerto Rico

Llanos Costa
- Barrio
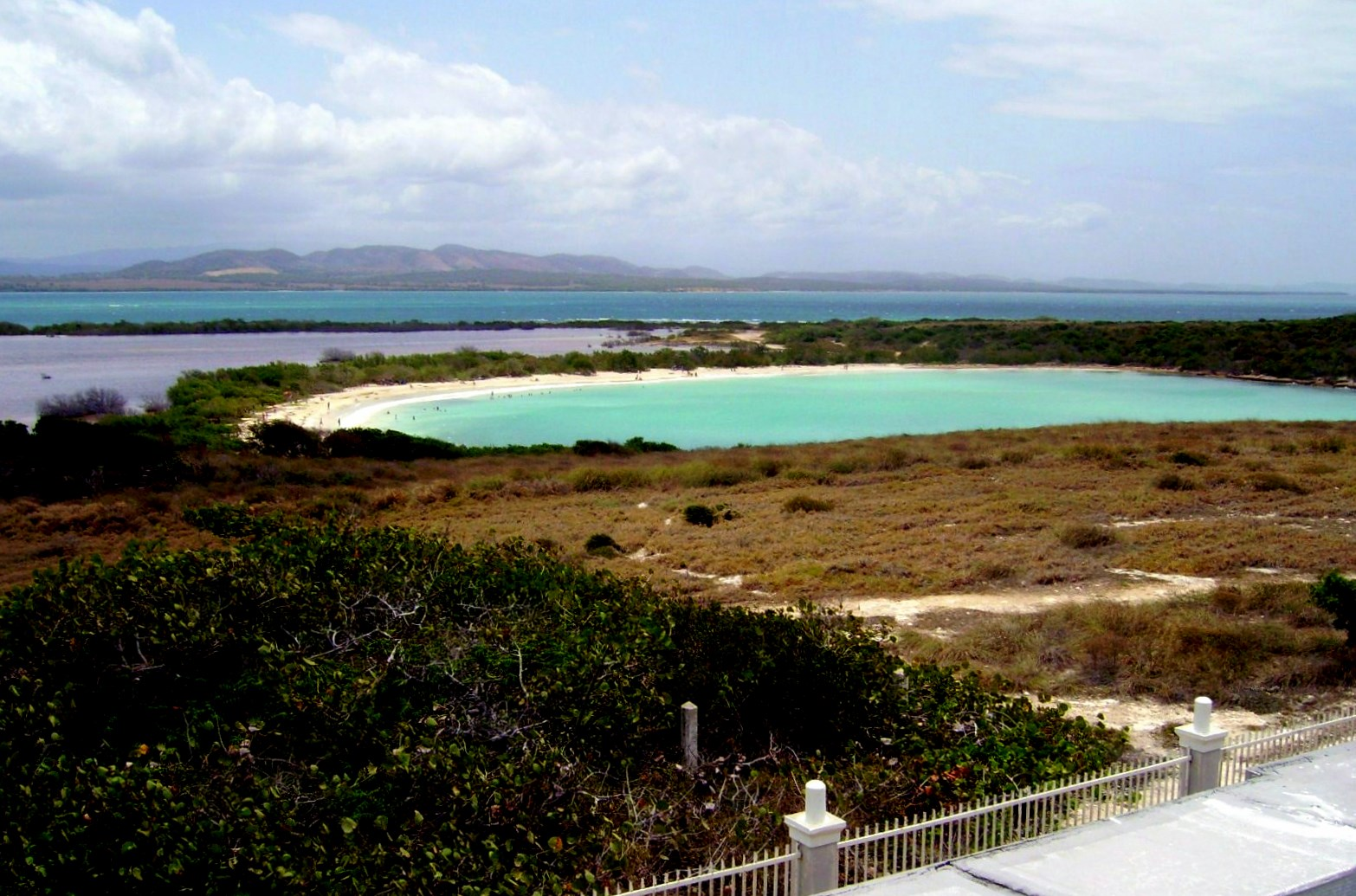
- A view of Llanos Costa

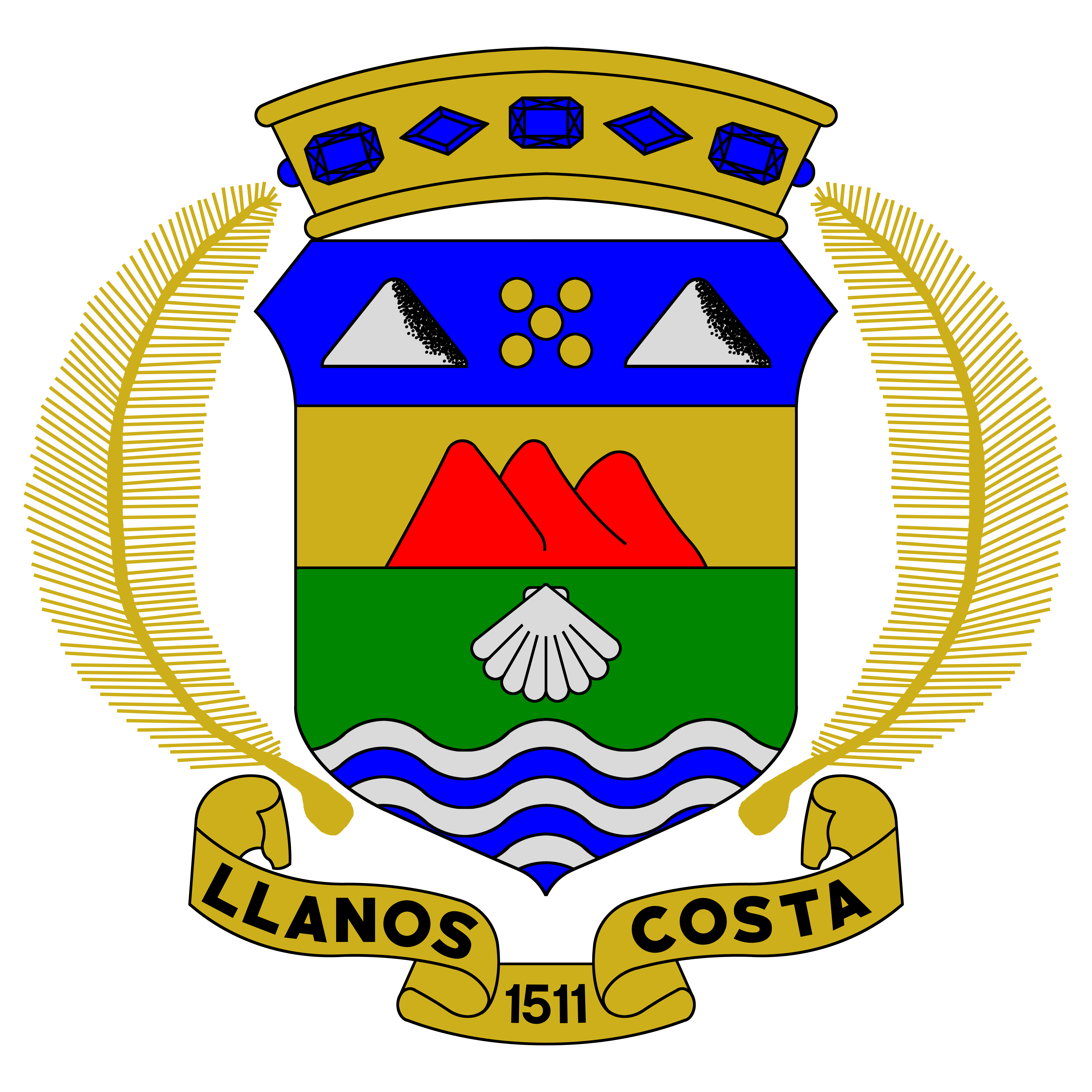
- Flag Seal

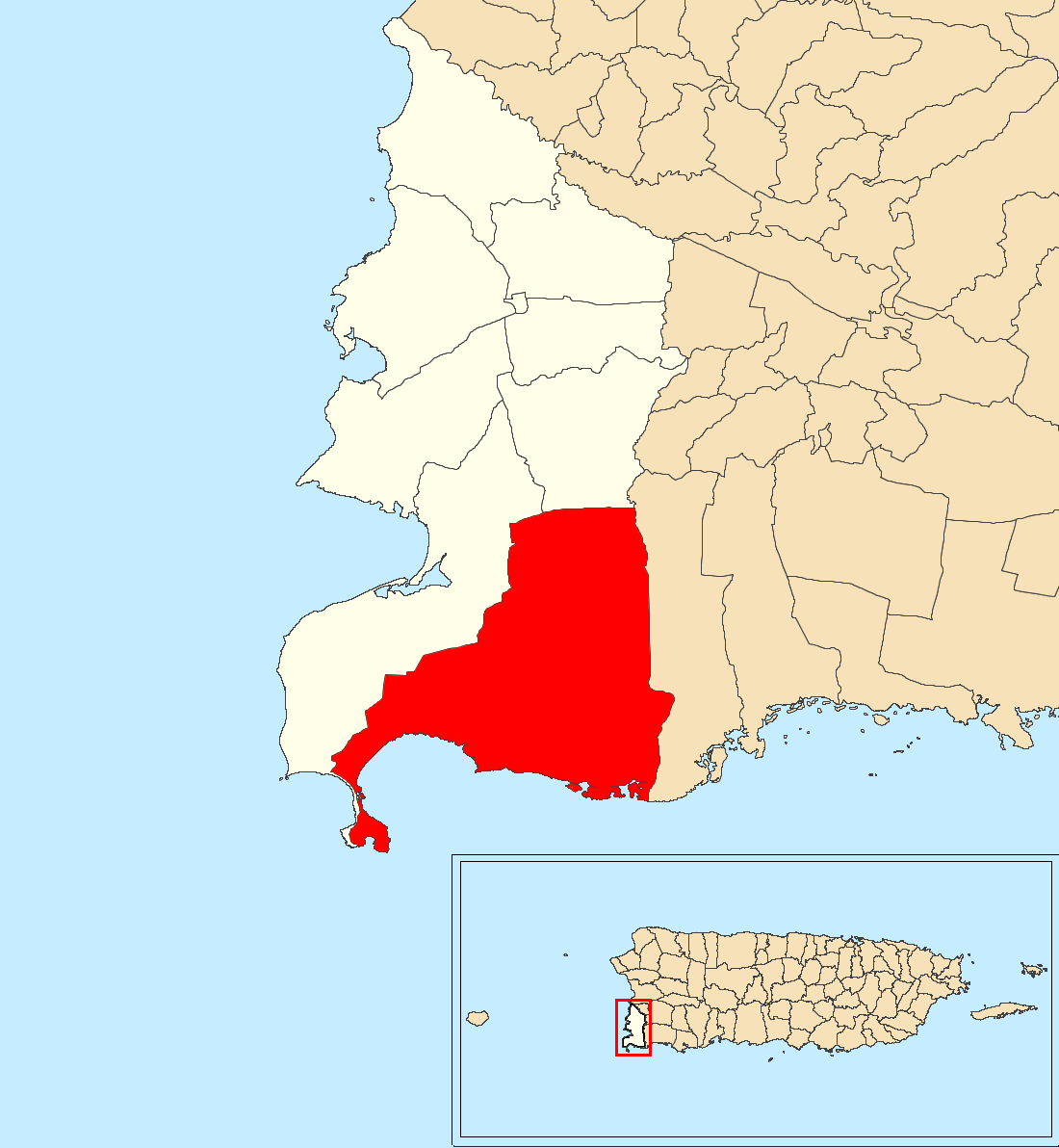
- Location of Llanos Costa within the municipality of Cabo Rojo shown in red

- Location of Puerto Rico
- Coordinates: 17°58′45″N 67°08′28″W
- Commonwealth: Puerto Rico
- Municipality: Cabo Rojo

Area
  - Total: 23.49 sq mi (60.8 km^{2})
  - Land: 19.52 sq mi (50.6 km^{2})
  - Water: 3.97 sq mi (10.3 km^{2})
- Elevation: 223 ft (68 m)

Population (2010)
  - Total: 3,571
  - Density: 182.9/sq mi (70.6/km^{2})
- Source: 2010 Census
- Time zone: UTC−4 (AST)
- ZIP code: 00623

Llanos Costa is a barrio in the municipality of Cabo Rojo, Puerto Rico. Its population in 2010 was 3,571.

== History ==
Llanos Costa was in Spain's gazetteers until Puerto Rico was ceded by Spain in the aftermath of the Spanish–American War under the terms of the Treaty of Paris of 1898 and became an unincorporated territory of the United States. In 1899, the United States Department of War conducted a census of Puerto Rico finding that the population of Llanos Costa barrio was 867.

Historical population
Census	Pop.	Note	%±
1900	867		—
1910	1,246		43.7%
1920	1,281		2.8%
1930	1,402		9.4%
1940	2,059		46.9%
1950	2,471		20.0%
1960	1,186		−52.0%
1970	1,267		6.8%
1980	1,849		45.9%
1990	2,511		35.8%
2000	3,495		39.2%
2010	3,571		2.2%
U.S. Decennial Census; 1899 (shown as 1900) 1910-1930; 1930-1950 1980-2000 2010

== Gallery ==
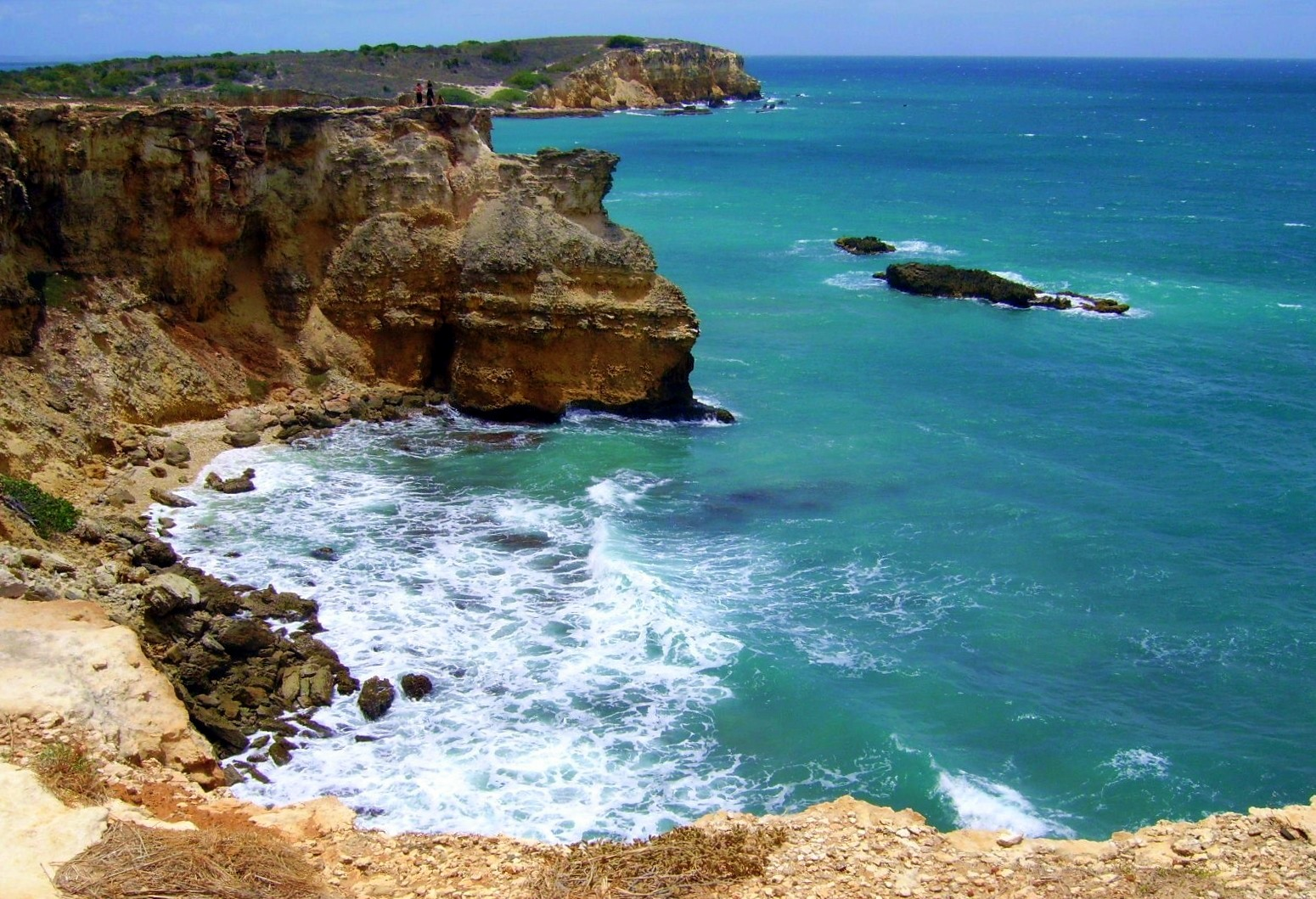
Rocky seashore in Llanos Costa near the Faro Los Morrillos de Cabo Rojo

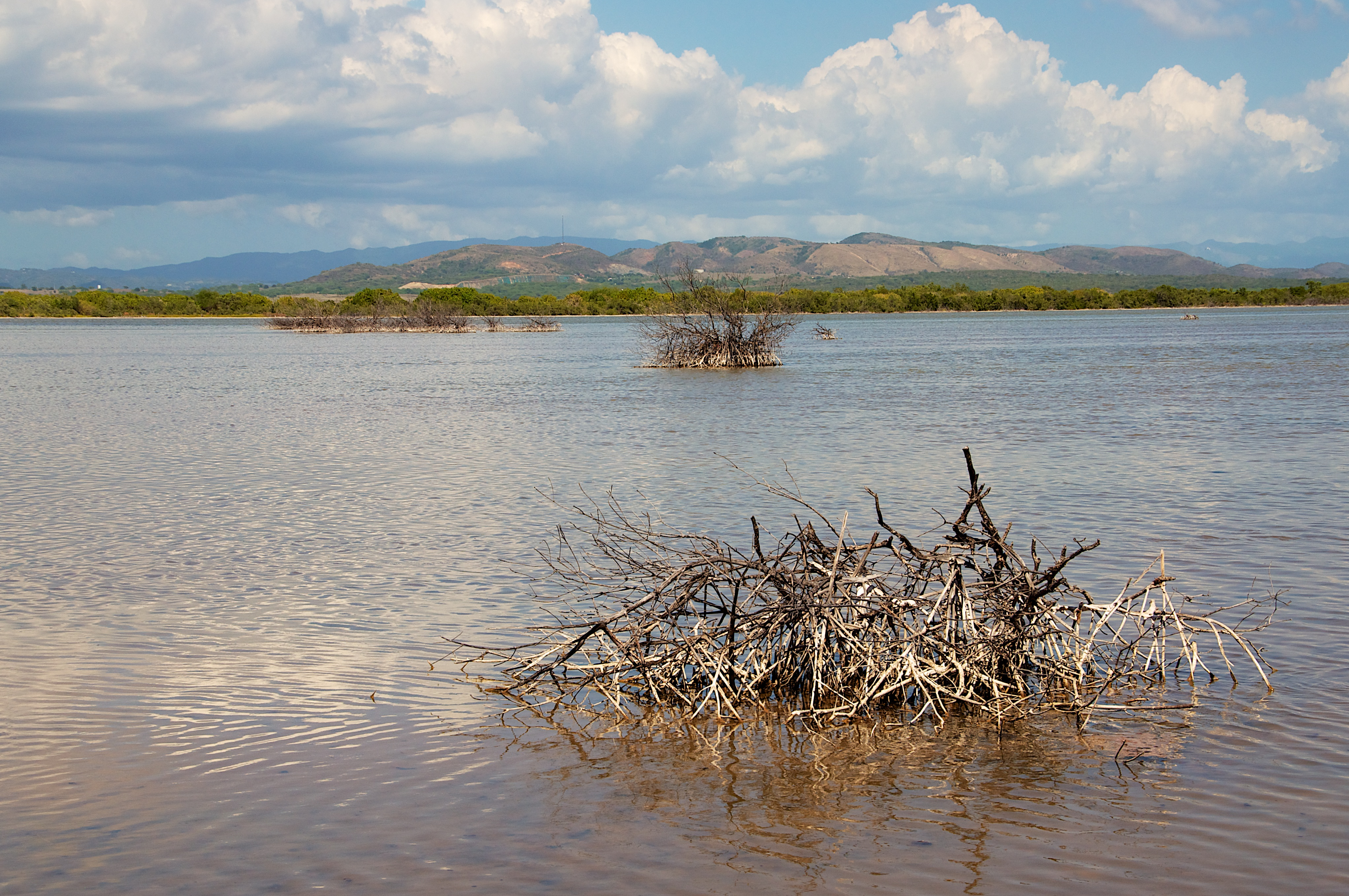

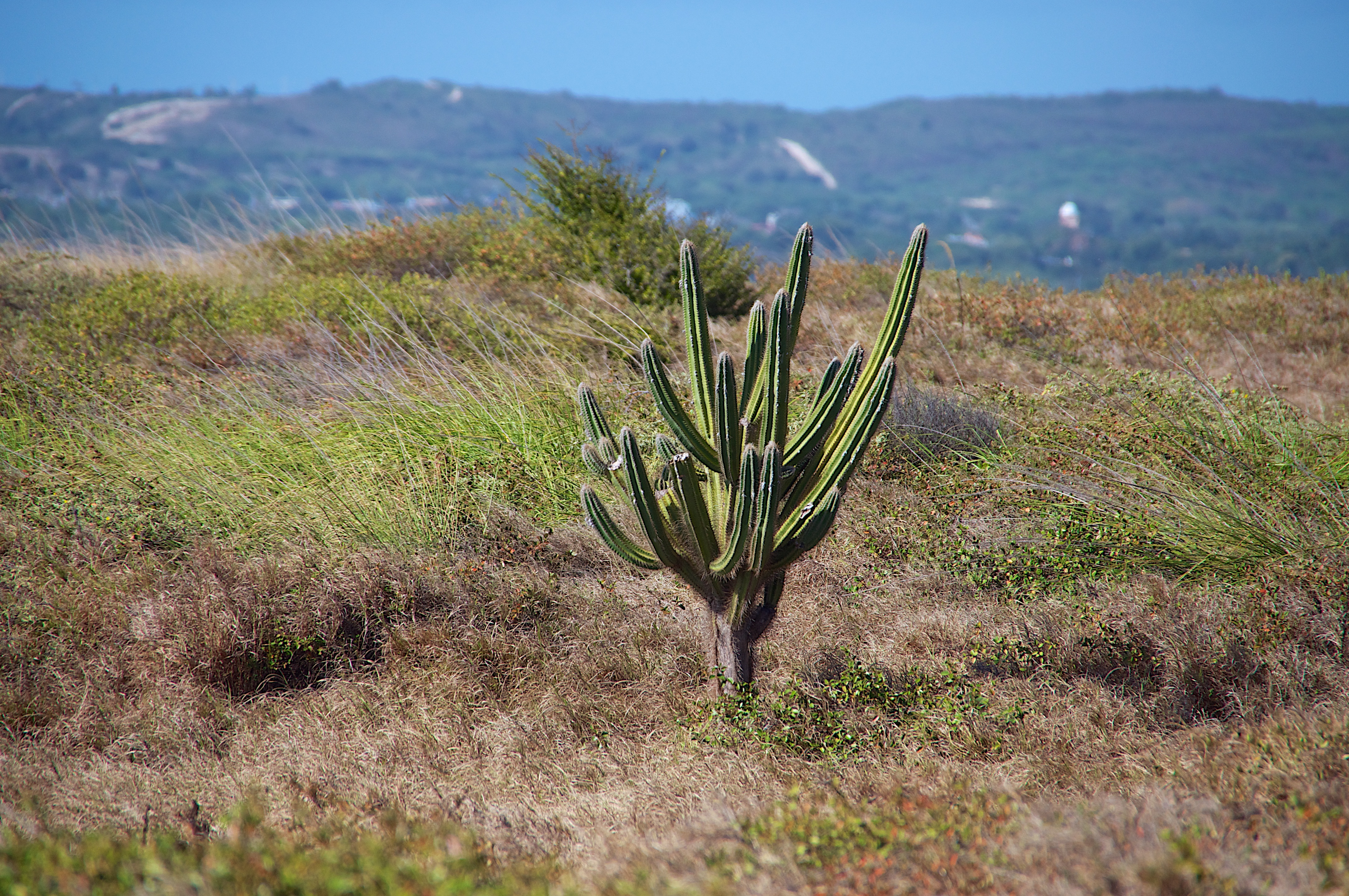

== See also ==
- List of communities in Puerto Rico
