= Sabana Eneas =

Barrio of San Germán, Puerto Rico

- Barrio
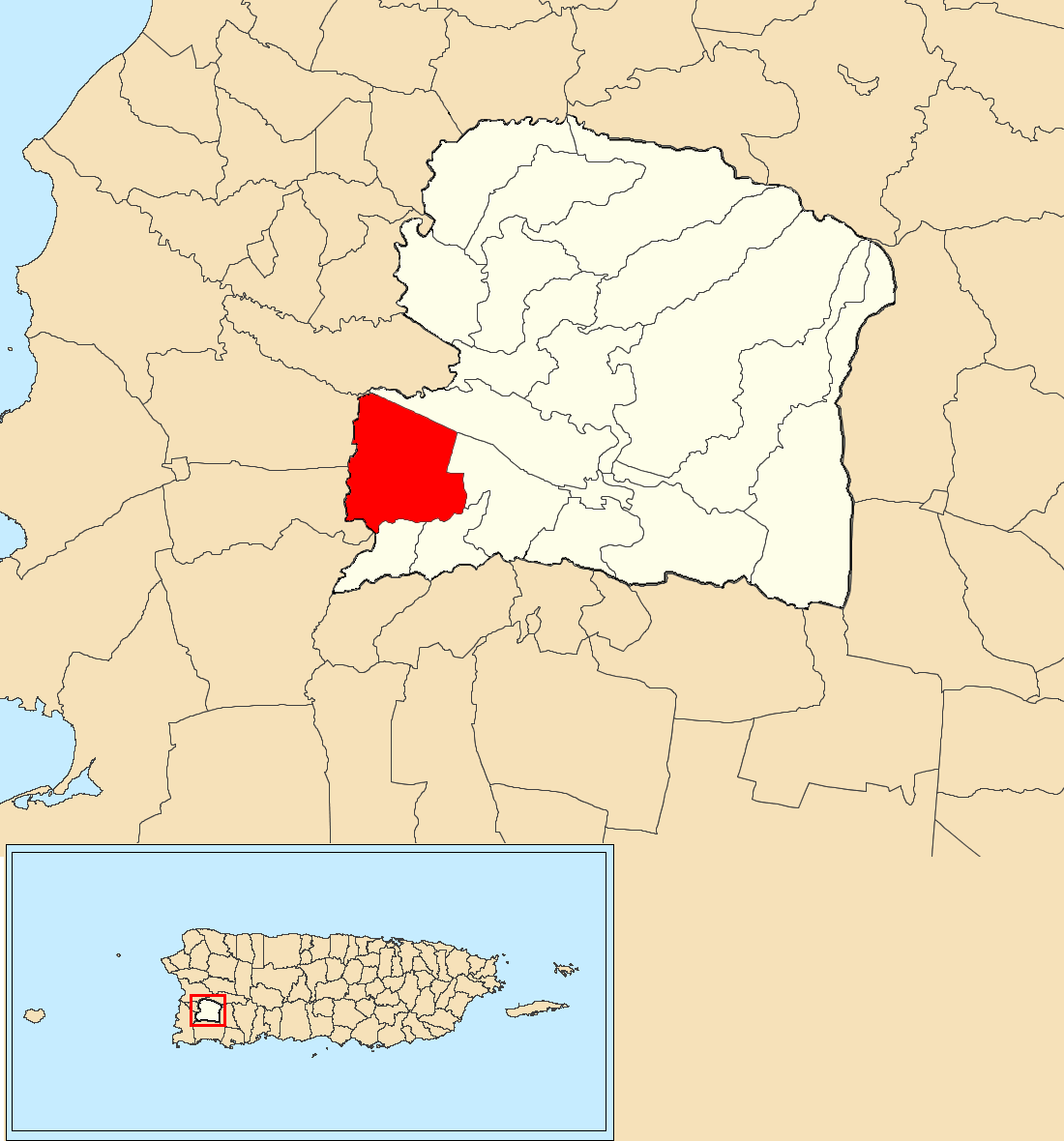
- Location of Sabana Eneas within the municipality of San Germán shown in red

- Location of Puerto Rico
- Coordinates: 18°05′16″N 67°05′34″W
- Commonwealth: Puerto Rico
- Municipality: San Germán

Area
  - Total: 3.26 sq mi (8.4 km^{2})
  - Land: 3.26 sq mi (8.4 km^{2})
  - Water: 0 sq mi (0 km^{2})
- Elevation: 75 ft (23 m)

Population (2010)
  - Total: 1,992
  - Density: 611/sq mi (236/km^{2})
- Source: 2010 Census
- Time zone: UTC−4 (AST)

Sabana Eneas is a barrio in the municipality of San Germán, Puerto Rico. Its population in 2010 was 1,992.

== History ==
Sabana Eneas was in Spain's gazetteers until Puerto Rico was ceded by Spain in the aftermath of the Spanish–American War under the terms of the Treaty of Paris of 1898 and became an unincorporated territory of the United States. In 1899, the United States Department of War conducted a census of Puerto Rico finding that the combined population of Sabana Eneas and Ancones barrios was 1,132.

Historical population
Census	Pop.	Note	%±
1910	712		—
1920	744		4.5%
1930	752		1.1%
1940	727		−3.3%
1950	1,040		43.1%
1960	1,457		40.1%
1970	1,492		2.4%
1980	2,071		38.8%
1990	2,353		13.6%
2000	2,188		−7.0%
2010	1,992		−9.0%
U.S. Decennial Census; 1900 (N/A) 1910-1930; 1930-1950 1980-2000 2010

== See also ==
- List of communities in Puerto Rico
