= Ancones, San Germán, Puerto Rico =

Barrio of Puerto Rico

Ancones
- Barrio
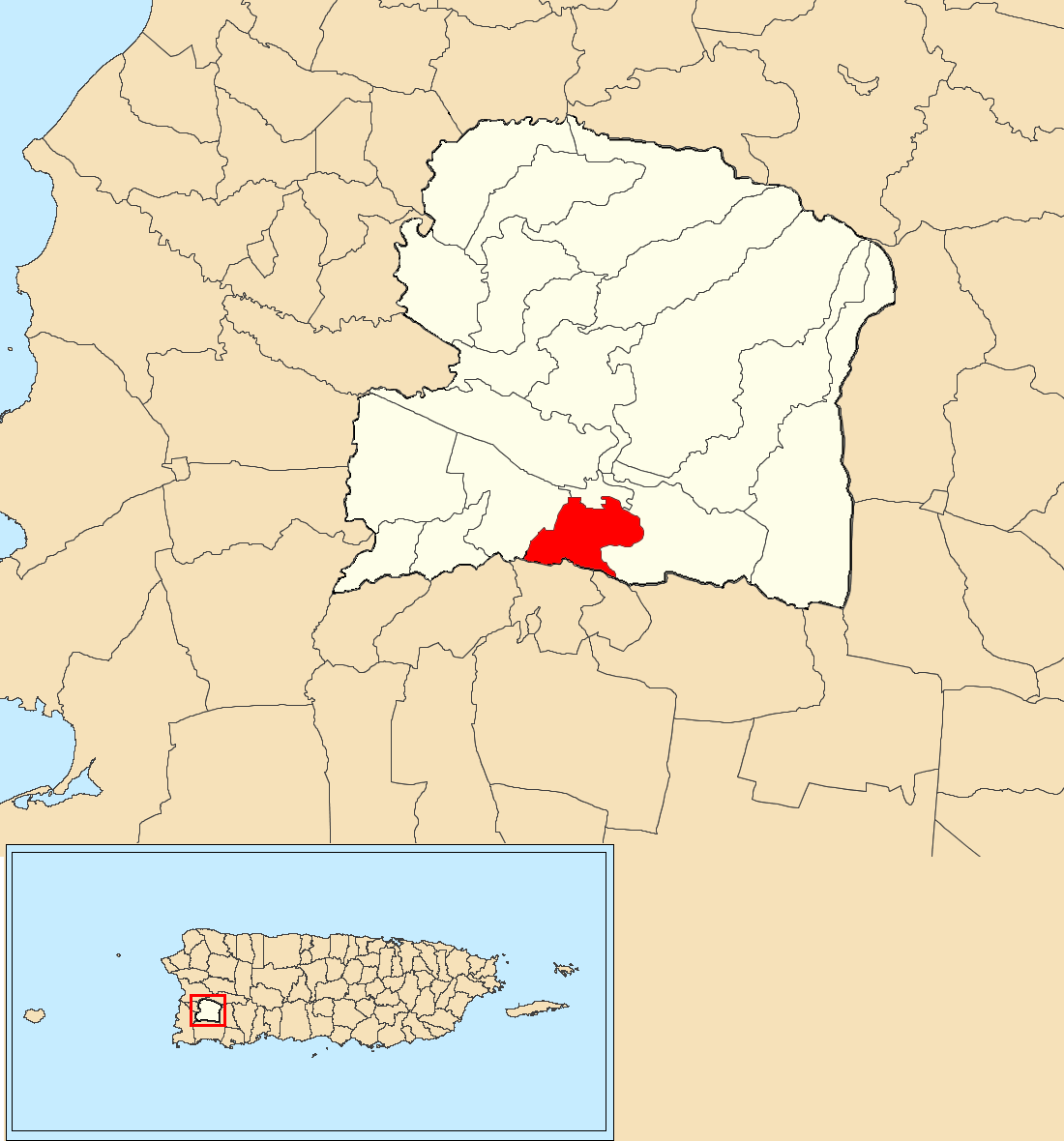
- Location of Ancones within the municipality of San Germán shown in red

- Location of Puerto Rico
- Coordinates: 18°04′14″N 67°02′49″W
- Commonwealth: Puerto Rico
- Municipality: San Germán

Area
  - Total: 1.47 sq mi (3.8 km^{2})
  - Land: 1.47 sq mi (3.8 km^{2})
  - Water: 0 sq mi (0 km^{2})
- Elevation: 269 ft (82 m)

Population (2010)
  - Total: 1,386
  - Density: 942.9/sq mi (364.1/km^{2})
- Source: 2010 Census
- Time zone: UTC−4 (AST)

Ancones is a barrio in the municipality of San Germán, Puerto Rico. Its population in 2010 was 1,386.

== History ==
Ancones was in Spain's gazetteers until Puerto Rico was ceded by Spain in the aftermath of the Spanish–American War under the terms of the Treaty of Paris of 1898 and became an unincorporated territory of the United States. In 1899, the United States Department of War conducted a census of Puerto Rico finding that the combined population of Ancones and Sabana Eneas barrios was 1,132.

Historical population
Census	Pop.	Note	%±
1910	457		—
1920	545		19.3%
1930	645		18.3%
1940	1,481		129.6%
1950	1,107		−25.3%
1960	941		−15.0%
1970	0		−100.0%
1980	1,633		—
1990	1,762		7.9%
2000	1,742		−1.1%
2010	1,386		−20.4%
U.S. Decennial Census; 1900 (N/A) 1910-1930; 1930-1950 1980-2000 2010

== See also ==
- List of communities in Puerto Rico
