= Monte Grande, Cabo Rojo, Puerto Rico =

Barrio of Puerto Rico

Monte Grande
- Barrio
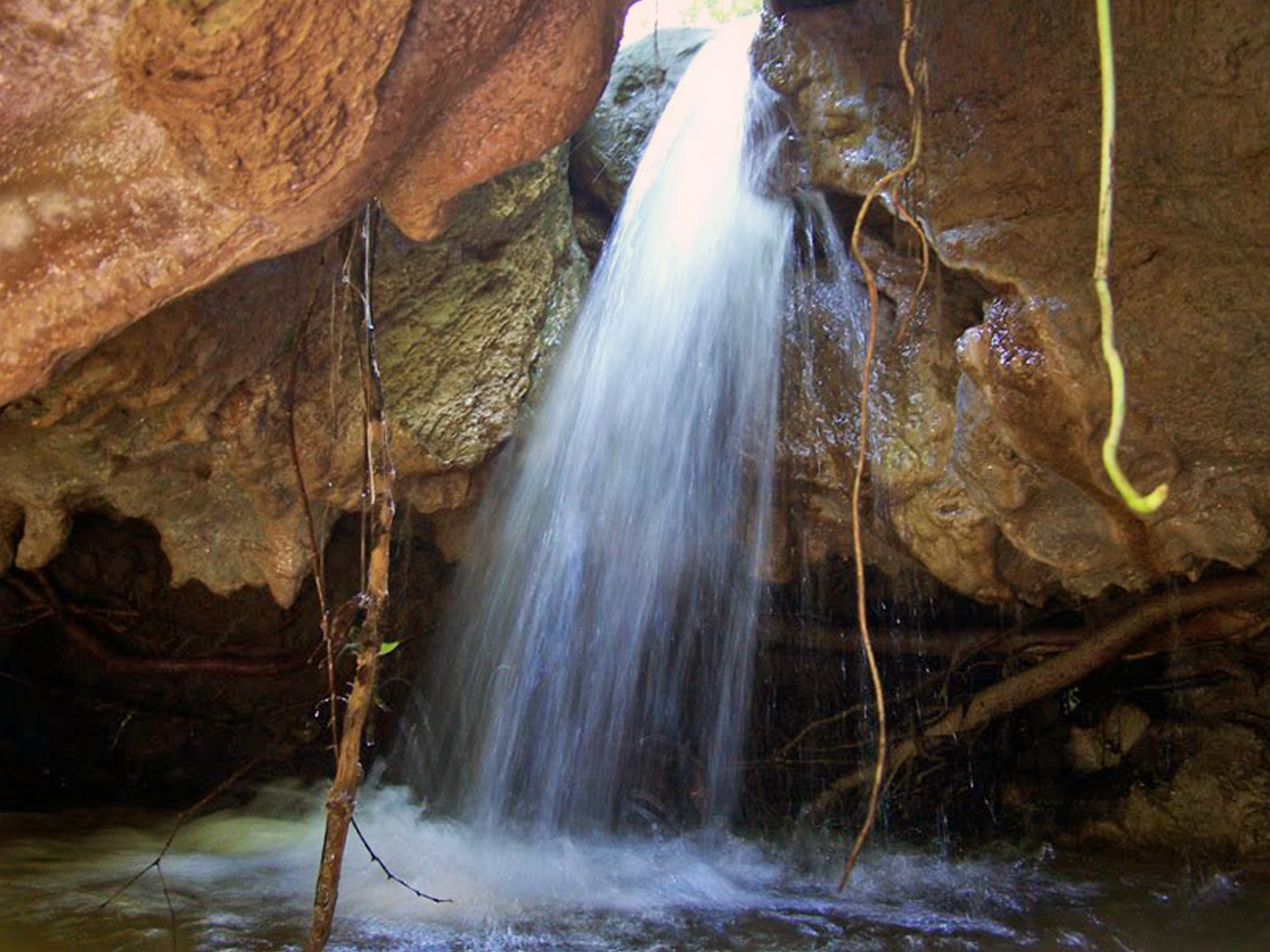
- Los Chorros in Monte Grande

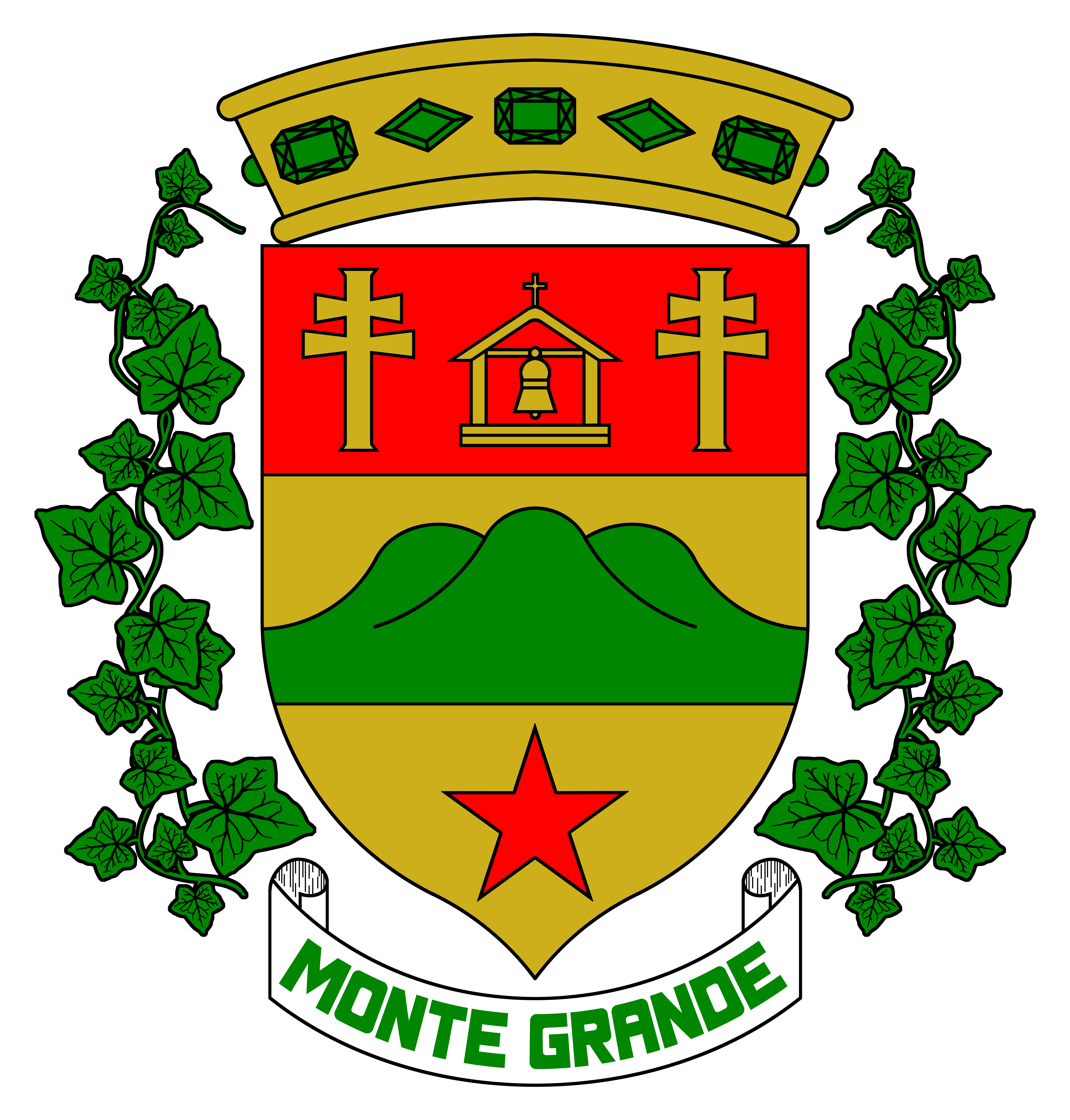
- Flag Seal

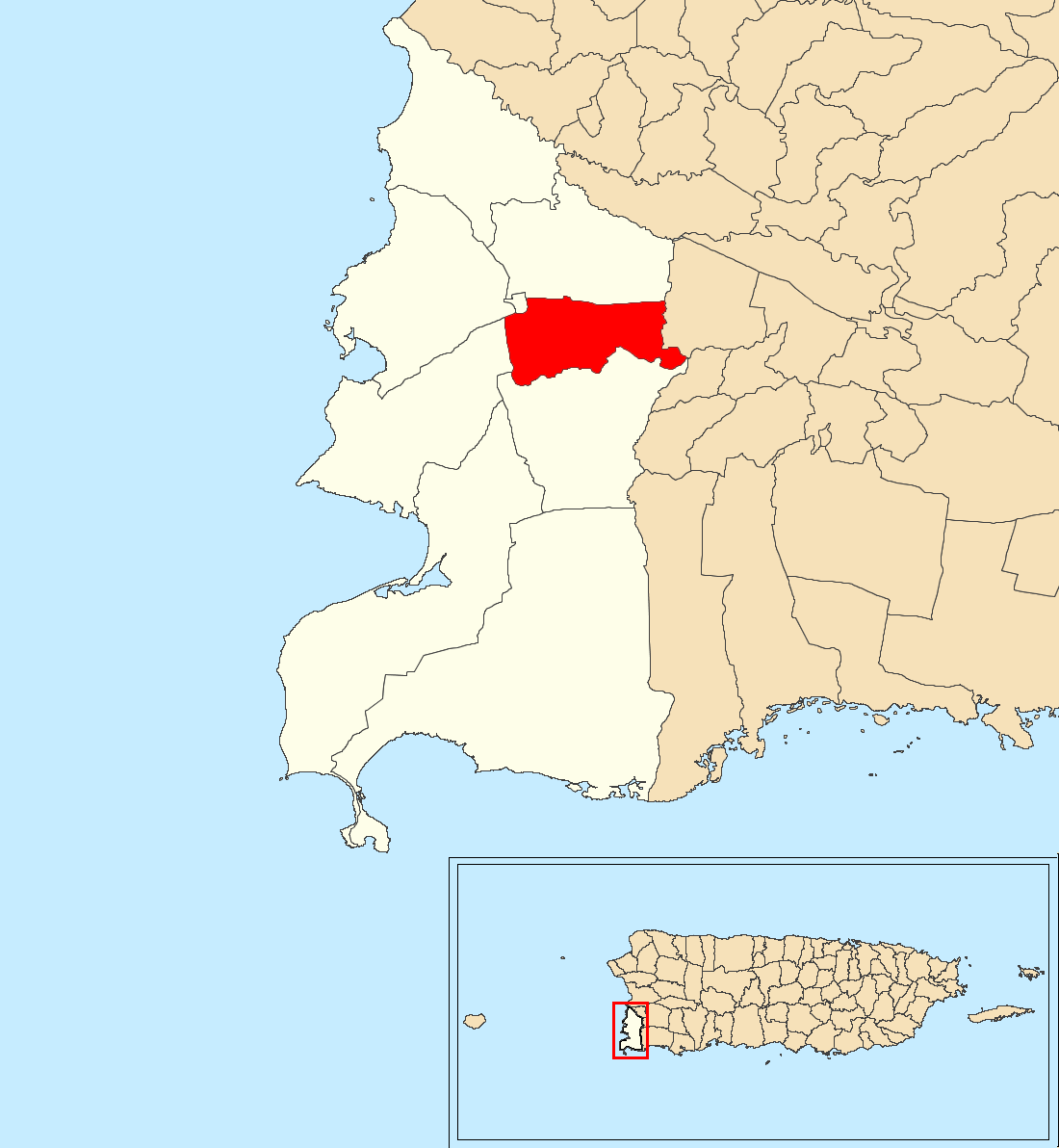
- Location of Monte Grande within the municipality of Cabo Rojo shown in red

- Location of Puerto Rico
- Coordinates: 18°04′29″N 67°07′38″W
- Commonwealth: Puerto Rico
- Municipality: Cabo Rojo

Area
  - Total: 3.8 sq mi (9.8 km^{2})
  - Land: 3.8 sq mi (9.8 km^{2})
  - Water: 0.0 sq mi (0 km^{2})
- Elevation: 292 ft (89 m)

Population (2010)
  - Total: 7,227
  - Density: 1,901.8/sq mi (734.3/km^{2})
- Source: 2010 Census
- Time zone: UTC−4 (AST)
- ZIP code: 00623

Monte Grande is a barrio in the municipality of Cabo Rojo, Puerto Rico. Its population in 2010 was 7,227.

== Features ==
Quebrada Los Chorros is located in Monte Grande.

== History ==
Monte Grande was in Spain's gazetteers until Puerto Rico was ceded by Spain in the aftermath of the Spanish–American War under the terms of the Treaty of Paris of 1898 and became an unincorporated territory of the United States. In 1899, the United States Department of War conducted a census of Puerto Rico finding that the population of Monte Grande barrio was 2,019.

Historical population
Census	Pop.	Note	%±
1900	2,019		—
1910	2,233		10.6%
1920	2,335		4.6%
1930	2,654		13.7%
1940	3,763		41.8%
1950	4,335		15.2%
1960	4,497		3.7%
1970	0		−100.0%
1980	4,892		—
1990	5,206		6.4%
2000	6,275		20.5%
2010	7,227		15.2%
U.S. Decennial Census; 1899 (shown as 1900) 1910-1930; 1930-1950 1980-2000 2010

== See also ==
- List of communities in Puerto Rico
