= Llanos Tuna, Cabo Rojo, Puerto Rico =

Barrio of Puerto Rico

Llanos Tuna
- Barrio
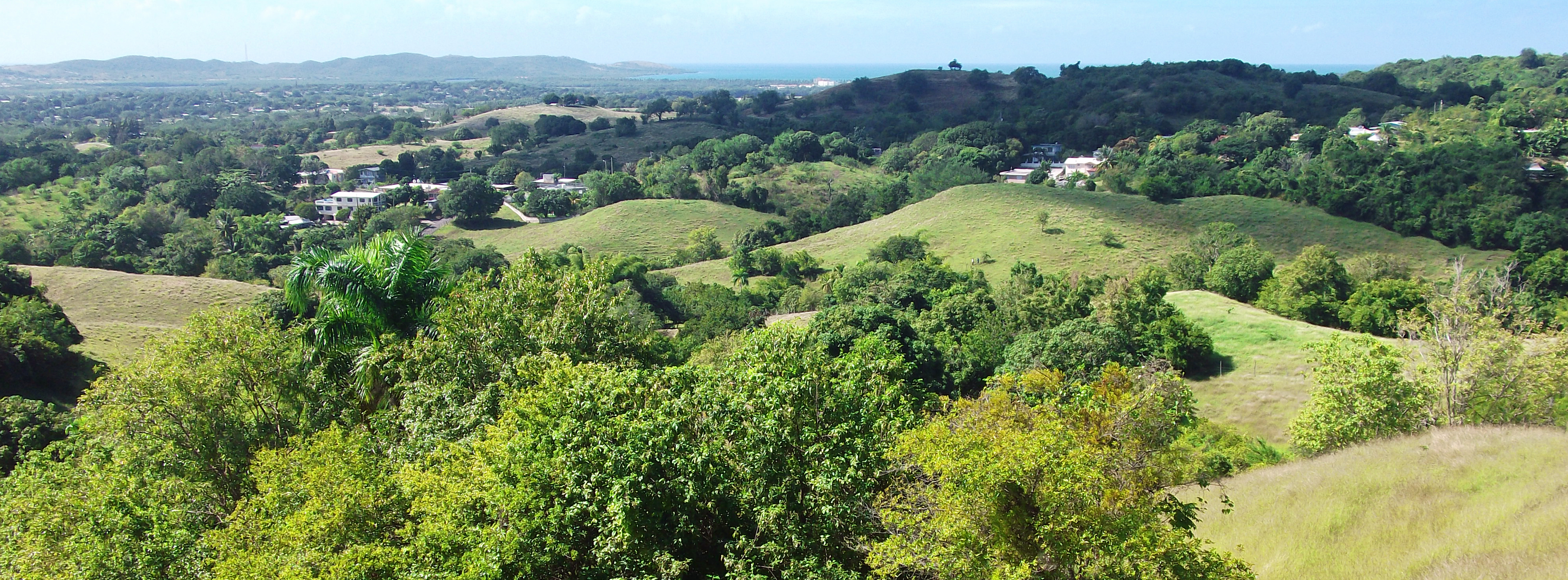
- View from Llanos Tuna

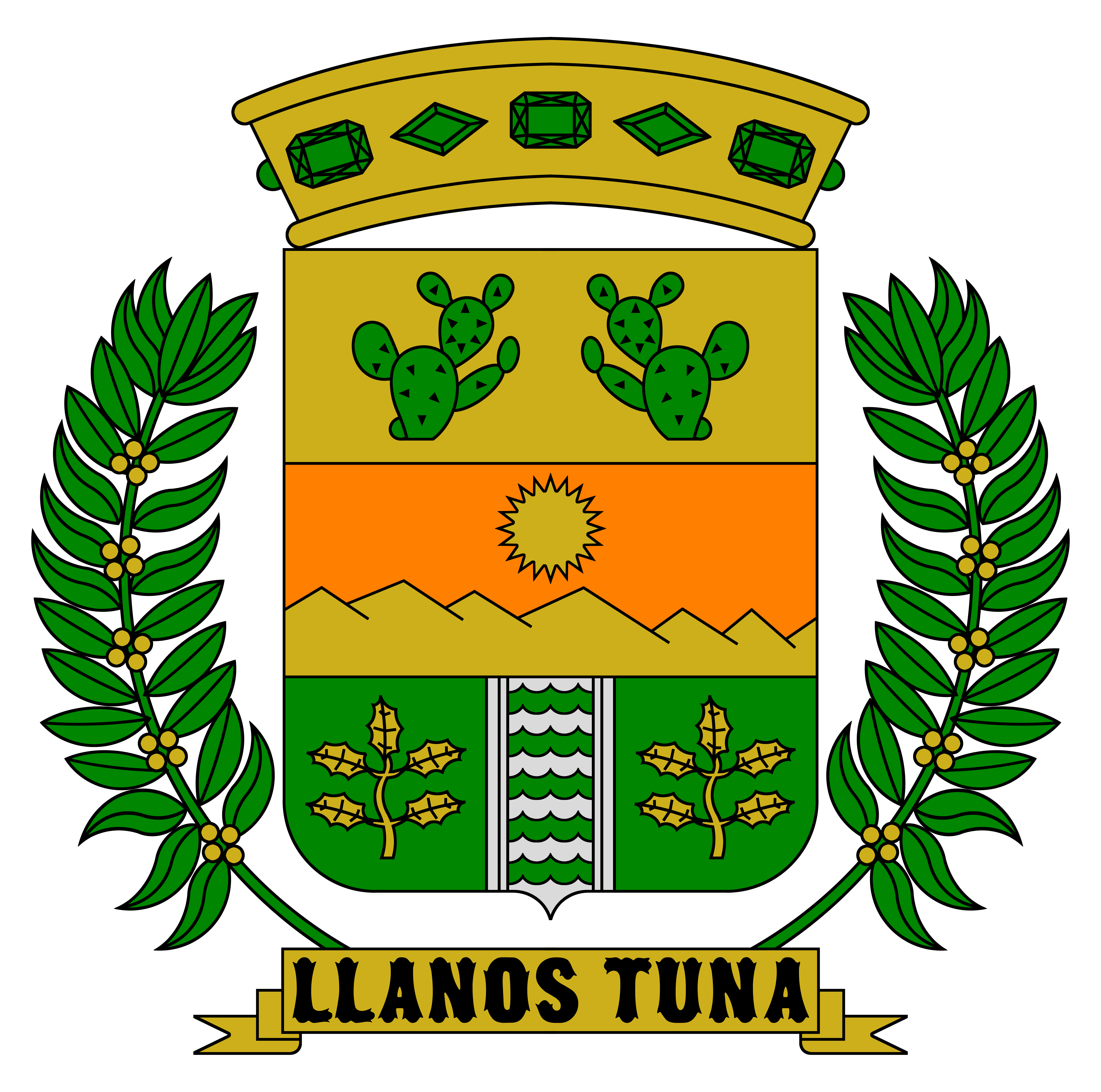
- Flag Seal

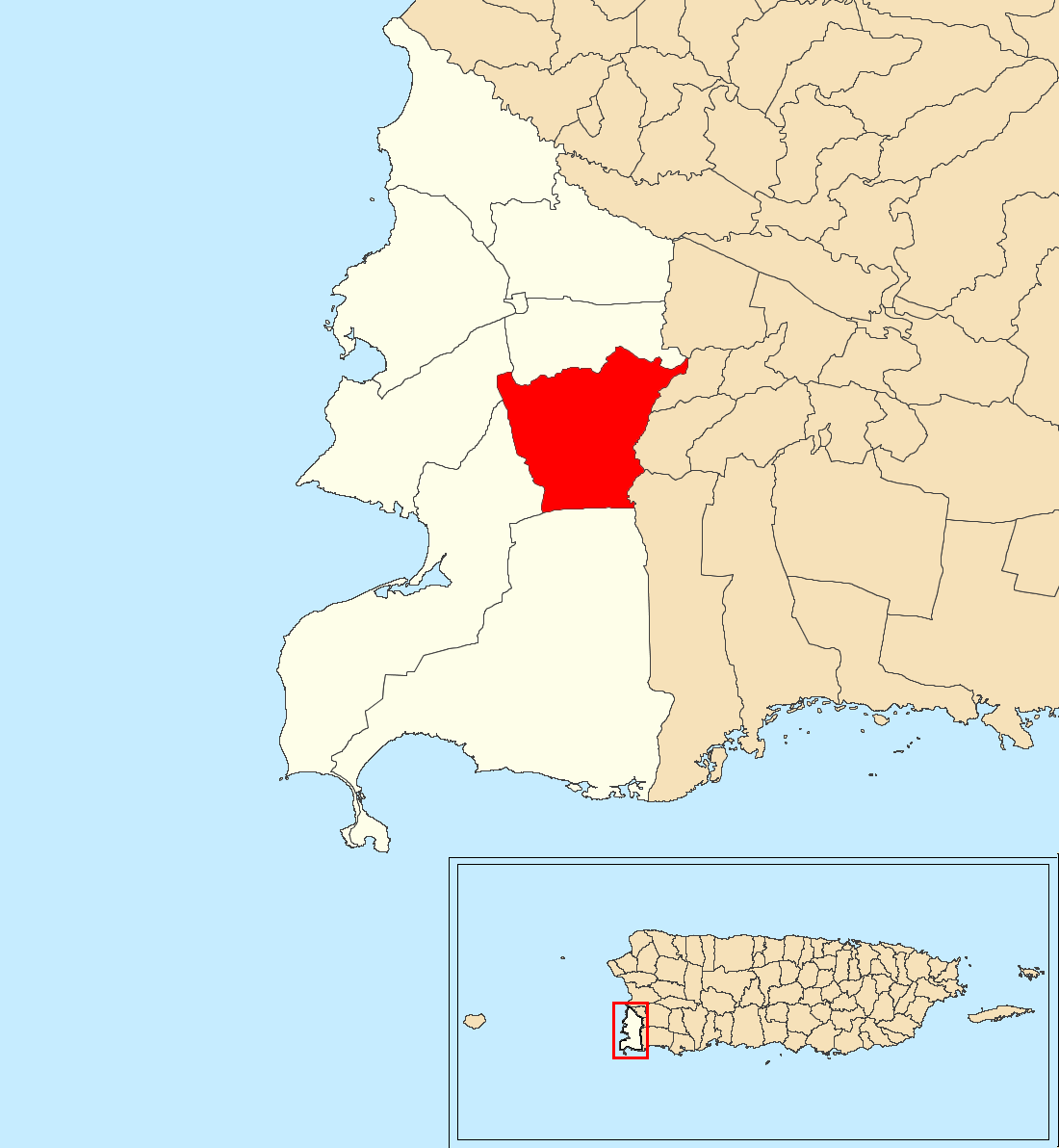
- Location of Llanos Tuna within the municipality of Cabo Rojo shown in red

- Location of Puerto Rico
- Coordinates: 18°03′02″N 67°07′44″W
- Commonwealth: Puerto Rico
- Municipality: Cabo Rojo

Area
  - Total: 6.63 sq mi (17.2 km^{2})
  - Land: 6.63 sq mi (17.2 km^{2})
  - Water: 0.00 sq mi (0 km^{2})
- Elevation: 266 ft (81 m)

Population (2010)
  - Total: 6,183
  - Density: 932.6/sq mi (360.1/km^{2})
- Source: 2010 Census
- Time zone: UTC−4 (AST)
- ZIP code: 00623

Llanos Tuna is a barrio in the municipality of Cabo Rojo, Puerto Rico. Its population in 2010 was 6,183.

== History ==
Llanos Tuna was in Spain's gazetteers until Puerto Rico was ceded by Spain in the aftermath of the Spanish–American War under the terms of the Treaty of Paris of 1898 and became an unincorporated territory of the United States. In 1899, the United States Department of War conducted a census of Puerto Rico finding that the population of Llanos Tuna barrio was 2,976.

Historical population
Census	Pop.	Note	%±
1900	2,976		—
1910	3,097		4.1%
1920	3,628		17.1%
1930	3,633		0.1%
1940	4,153		14.3%
1950	3,734		−10.1%
1960	3,305		−11.5%
1970	3,748		13.4%
1980	4,880		30.2%
1990	5,289		8.4%
2000	5,765		9.0%
2010	6,183		7.3%
U.S. Decennial Census; 1899 (shown as 1900) 1910-1930; 1930-1950 1980-2000 2010

== See also ==
- List of communities in Puerto Rico
