= Guanajibo River =

River of Puerto Rico

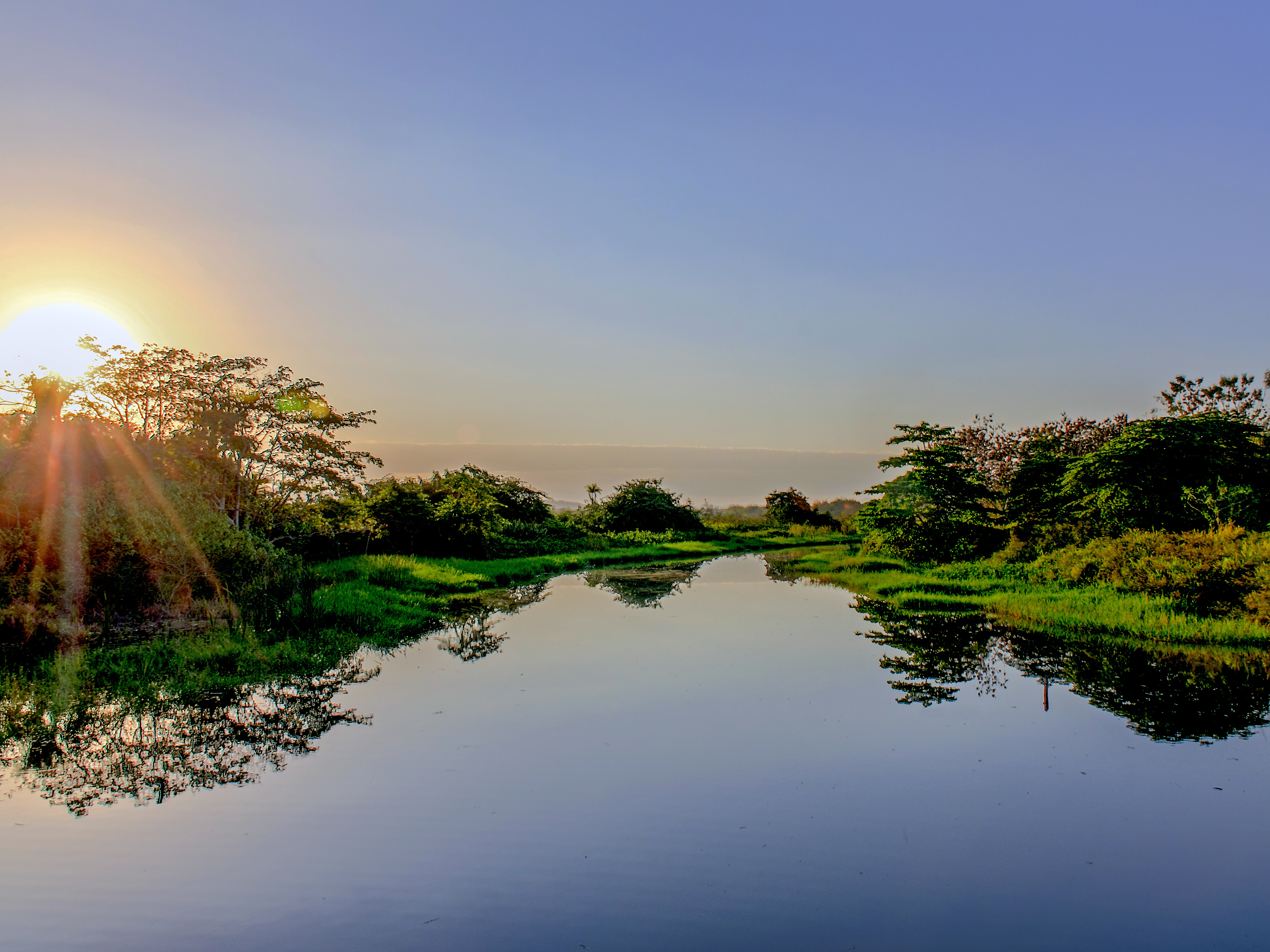
- Guanajibo River in Cabo Rojo
- Native name: Río Guanajibo (Spanish)

Location
- Commonwealth: Puerto Rico
- Municipality: Hormigueros, Cabo Rojo, Mayagüez, San Germán, and Sabana Grande

Physical characteristics
- Source
  - coordinates: 18.1682894°N 67.1807356°W
- Length: 19 mi (31 km)

The Guanajibo River (Spanish: Río Guanajibo) is a river that runs through Hormigueros, Cabo Rojo, Mayagüez, San Germán, and Sabana Grande in Puerto Rico.

== Flood control project ==
In mid 2018, the United States Army Corps of Engineers announced it would be undertaking a major flood control project of the river, with a $60 million budget.

== See also ==
- Silva Bridge: NRHP listing in Cabo Rojo, Puerto Rico
- List of rivers of Puerto Rico
