= Guanajibo, Cabo Rojo, Puerto Rico =

Barrio of Puerto Rico

Guanajibo
- Barrio
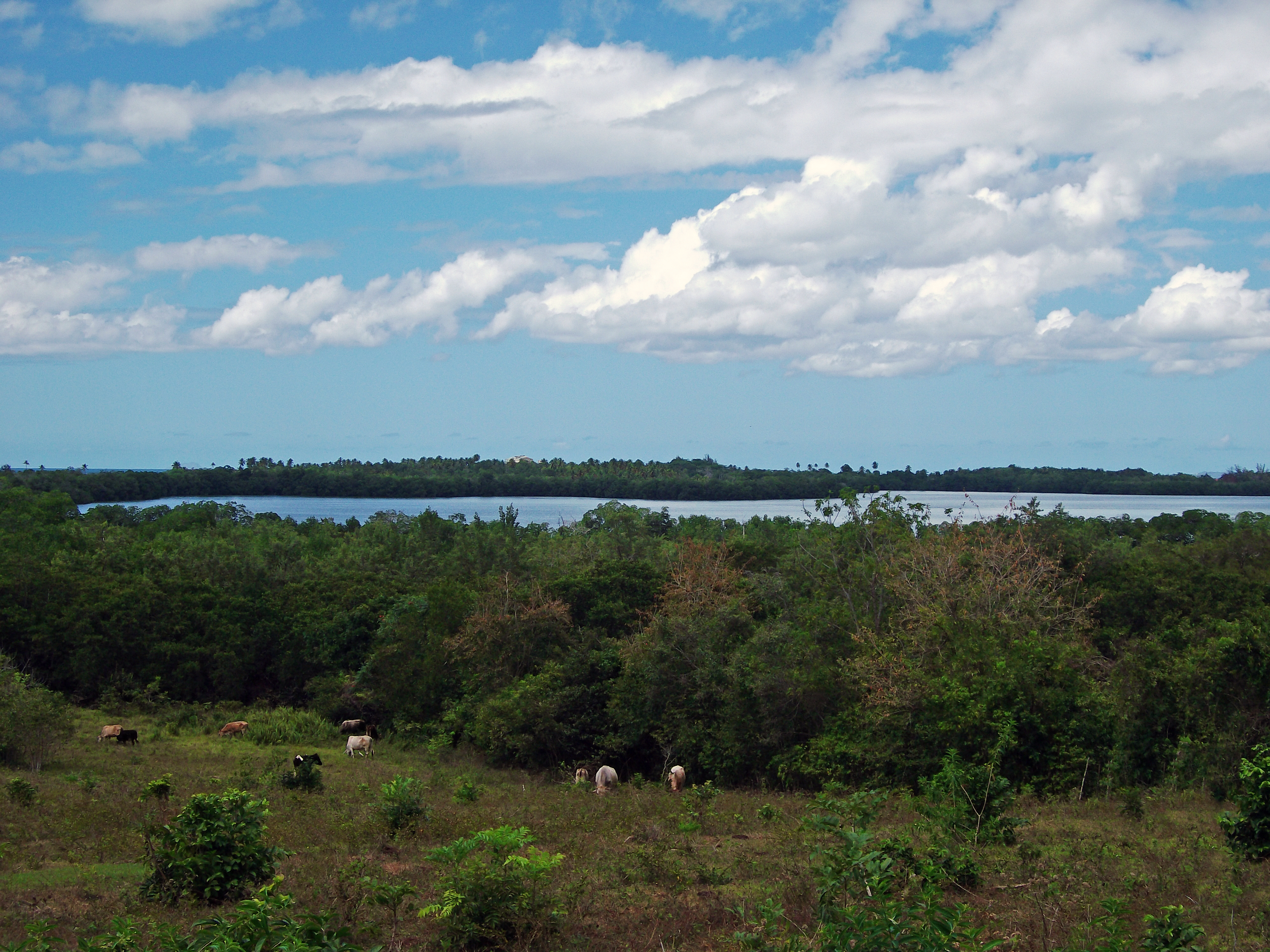
- Laguna Joyuda

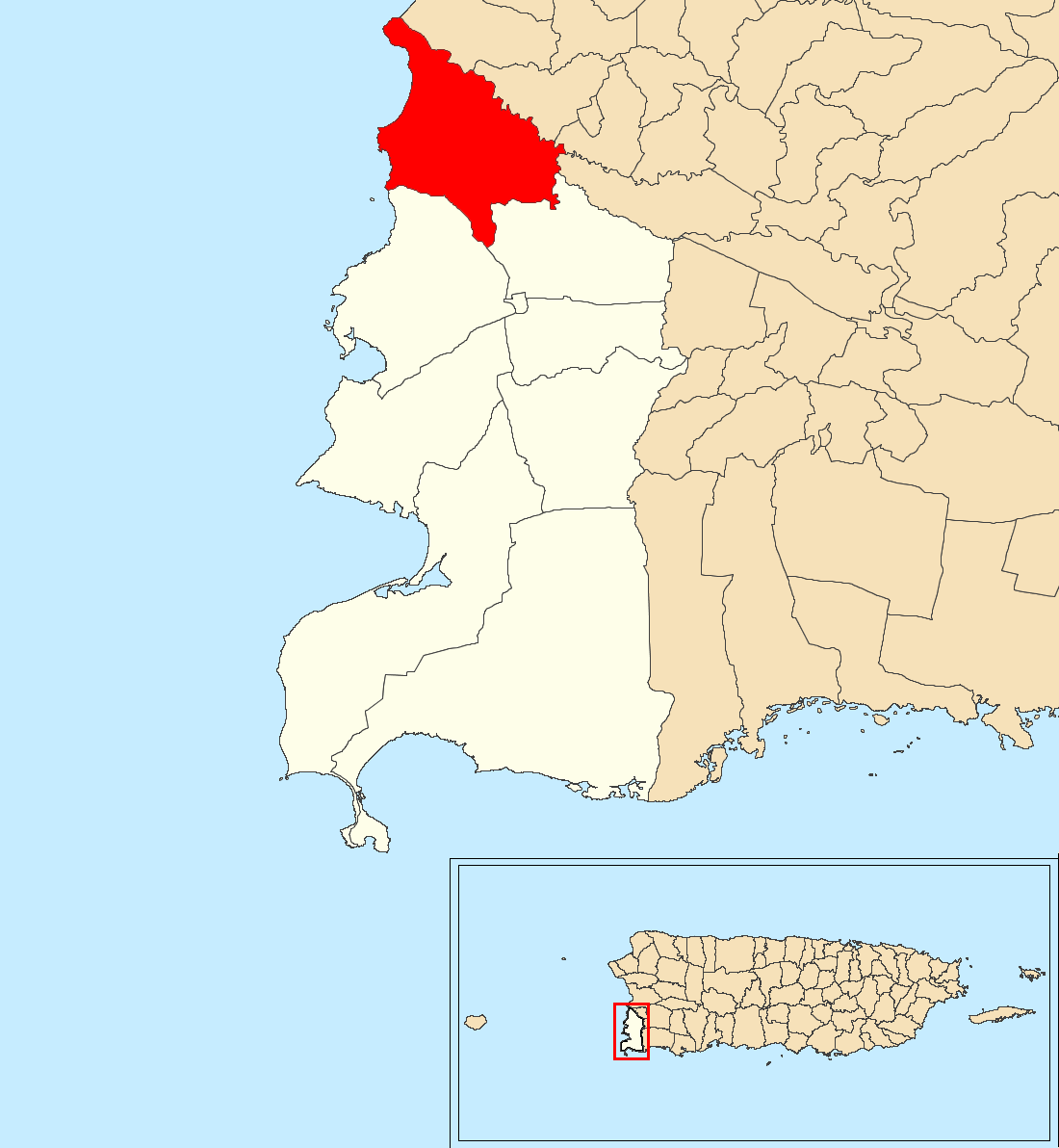
- Location of Guanajibo within the municipality of Cabo Rojo shown in red

- Location of Puerto Rico
- Coordinates: 18°08′16″N 67°10′01″W
- Commonwealth: Puerto Rico
- Municipality: Cabo Rojo

Area
  - Total: 8.94 sq mi (23.2 km^{2})
  - Land: 6.88 sq mi (17.8 km^{2})
  - Water: 2.06 sq mi (5.3 km^{2})
- Elevation: 223 ft (68 m)

Population (2010)
  - Total: 4,905
  - Density: 712.9/sq mi (275.3/km^{2})
- Source: 2010 Census
- Time zone: UTC−4 (AST)
- ZIP code: 00623

Guanajibo is a barrio in the municipality of Cabo Rojo, Puerto Rico. Its population in 2010 was 4,905.

== Features ==
Laguna Joyuda is located in Guanajibo.

== History ==
Guanajibo was in Spain's gazetteers until Puerto Rico was ceded by Spain in the aftermath of the Spanish–American War under the terms of the Treaty of Paris of 1898 and became an unincorporated territory of the United States. In 1899, the United States Department of War conducted a census of Puerto Rico finding that the population of Guanajibo was 1,074.

Historical population
Census	Pop.	Note	%±
1900	1,074		—
1910	1,446		34.6%
1920	1,738		20.2%
1930	1,606		−7.6%
1940	2,162		34.6%
1950	2,708		25.3%
1960	2,666		−1.6%
1970	1,843		−30.9%
1980	2,312		25.4%
1990	2,768		19.7%
2000	3,577		29.2%
2010	4,905		37.1%
U.S. Decennial Census; 1899 (shown as 1900) 1910-1930; 1930-1950 1980-2000 2010

== See also ==
- List of communities in Puerto Rico
