= List of Puerto Rico state forests =

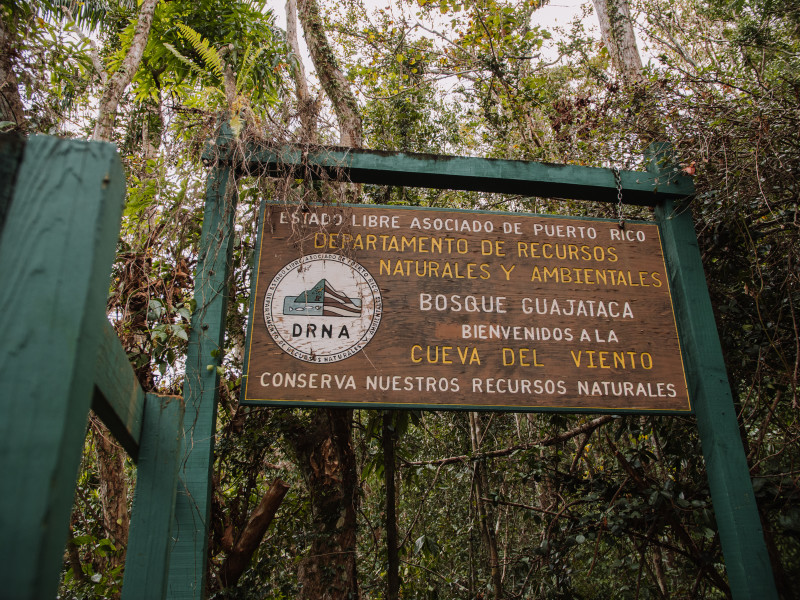
Example of a state forest landmark sign, this one for the Cueva Ventana in Guajataca.

Puerto Rico state forests (Spanish: Bosques estatales de Puerto Rico), sometimes referred to as Puerto Rico Commonwealth forests in English, are protected forest reserves managed by the government of Puerto Rico, particularly by the Puerto Rico Department of Natural and Environmental Resources. In addition to their function as protected forest reserves, many of the forests are analogous to state parks in other states and territories of the United States, as they also function as management units that cater to recreational, educational and cultural activities. Additionally, state forests in Puerto Rico can contain units with additional protection designations within their boundaries, as is the case of La Parguera Natural Reserve within Boquerón State Forest, for example. There are currently 20 units in the Puerto Rico state forest system.

== History ==
The first protected forests in Puerto Rico were designated not for their ecological value but for their industrial timber utility in the form of Spanish Crown Lands under the Inspección de Montes, the equivalent of the Spanish Colonial Forest service. El Yunque, for example, was the first forested area to receive this designation in Puerto Rico.

Puerto Rico became a territory of the United States in the aftermath of the Spanish-American War in 1898 and, in 1903, President Theodore Roosevelt set aside these former timberlands to proclaim the Luquillo Forest Reserve, the first ecologically protected area in the island. Meanwhile, on the state level, colonial governor Arthur Yager set aside mangrove forests along the coasts of Puerto Rico for their ecological value between 1918 and 1919: Aguirre, Boquerón, Ceiba, and Guánica. The latter had its boundaries extended in order to protect a large tract of dry forest, a type of ecosystem that used to be common in the Caribbean but had now almost completely disappeared. These became the first state or territorial-level protected forests in the island and, in December 1919, ownership of the federally protected forest tract in the westernmost portion of the Cordillera Central passed to the territorial government, making the Maricao Forest the first woodland to receive this designation.

By 1935 all the newly protected woodlands of Puerto Rico under were consolidated as part of the Caribbean National Forest, which was then divided into the areas of the Sierra de Luquillo (El Yunque) and the Cordillera Central (Guilarte and Toro Negro). In addition to their natural resources these areas were also managed as tourist attractions, something that is evident in the territory-wide construction projects of visitor infrastructure by the Civilian Conservation Corps during the 1930s Roosevelt presidency. Many of these structures and buildings today possess historical and architectural value, and some are listed in the National Register of Historic Places as New Deal Era Constructions in the Forest Reserves of Puerto Rico (1933-1942). A notable example of these is the Santa Ana Observation Tower, popularly called La Torre de Piedra. It was during this time that the ownership of the western portions of the Caribbean National Forest passed to the territorial government, creating Toro Negro in 1934 and Guilarte, which was separated from the latter, in 1935. In the following decades, previously designated natural reserves such as Carite, Guajataca and Rio Abajo were given the additional designation of state forest. Several of the forest, such as Bosque del Pueblo, San Patricio and Monte Choca, have gained their protected designation thanks to the actions of grassroots movements and local community actions.

== List of Puerto Rico state forests ==
The following are Puerto Rico state forests. (Note: Note on the area: As of August 2013, the Government of Puerto Rico is engaged in an ongoing plan of land purchase for the purpose of increasing its inventory of state forest land area. As a result the area figures given in this table should only be taken as approximations. Also, land measurements in Puerto Rico are given in cuerdas (one cuerda equals to 0.97 acres), and, as such, references to forest size below have been converted to acres to keep all such measurements standard throughout this article.)

No.	State Forest	Image	Municipalities	Est.	Area (acres)	Area Ref	Description (and Facilities)
1	Aguirre		Guayama and Santa Isabel	1918	2,390		Mangrove forest includes the Punta Petrona Natural Reserve, a number of offshore keys and portions of the former Central Aguirre. Borders the Jobos Bay National Estuarine Reserve in Salinas. Designated Important Bird Area. (B, F, G, K, O)
2	Boquerón		Cabo Rojo and Lajas	1918	4,630		Subtropical dry and mangrove forests, incl. the Finca Belvedere, Cayo Ratones, Joyuda Lagoon and La Parguera natural reserves, the Iris Alameda Wildlife Refuge, and the Cabo Rojo National Natural Landmark. Borders the Cabo Rojo National Wildlife Refuge. Designated Important Bird Area. (G, H, K, O, P, R, S, W)
3	Cambalache		Arecibo and Barceloneta	1973	1,019		Subtropical moist forest and mogotes (karstic hills) in the Northern Puerto Rico karst, portions also designated a natural reserve. Small section is open to the public. Designated component of the Karso del Norte Important Bird Area. (C, G, H, O, P, W)
4	Carite		Caguas, Cayey, Guayama, Patillas and San Lorenzo	1975	6,499		Subtropical moist forest of the Sierra de Cayey, centered around the Cerro La Santa massif. Incl. the Jorge Sotomayor del Toro Protected Natural Area, and the Guavate and Charco Azul recreational areas. Designated Important Bird Area. (C, G, H, O, P, S, W)
5	Ceiba		Ceiba and Fajardo	1918	352		Mangrove forest, incl. the Medio Mundo and Daguao Protected Natural Area and the Ensenada Honda area. Bordered by Roosevelt Roads. Designated Important Bird Area. (B, F, G, K, O, P, S)
6	Cerrillos		Ponce	1996	194		Subtropical moist forest in the Cordillera Central foothills, surrounds Lake Cerrillos. (B, F, G, H, K, O, P, R, W)
7	del Pueblo		Adjuntas	1995	737		Subtropical moist forest in the Cordillera Central. Important migratory passerine bird area. Officially one of the 20 state forests owned by the DRNA but this one is locally managed by the Taller de Arte y Cultura community-based group at Casa Pueblo. Designated component of the Cordillera Central Important Bird Area. (C, G, H, O, P, S, W)
8	Guajataca		Isabela	1943	2,286		Subtropical moist forest and mogotes (karstic hills) in the Northern Puerto Rico karst, home to numerous caves, canyons and sinkholes. Designated component of the Karso del Norte Important Bird Area. (C, G, H, O, P, W)
9	Guánica		Guánica, Guayanilla, Yauco, Peñuelas and Ponce	1919	10,670		Largest protected tract of dry forest in the Caribbean, also mangrove forests; home to endangered and endemic species (i.e. Puerto Rican crested toad). Incl. Punta Ballenas Natural Reserve and the Caña Gorda Cays. Designated UNESCO Biosphere Reserve, and Important Bird Area. (G, H, K, O, P, R, S, W)
10	Guilarte		Adjuntas, Peñuelas and Yauco	1935	4,822		Subtropical moist forest of the Cordillera Central, centered around Monte Guilarte. High density of endemic and migratory species, it is the last home of the rare and endangered Monte Guilarte hollyfern. Designated component of the Cordillera Central Important Bird Area. (G, H, O, W)
11	Los Tres Picachos		Ciales and Jayuya	1999	2,289		Subtropical moist forest of the Cordillera Central, centered around Los Tres Picachos. Important geological transition zone between the karst and cordillera geographical regions. Designated component of the Cordillera Central Important Bird Area. (H, O, W)
12	Maricao		Maricao, Sabana Grande, San Germán	1919	10,478		Second largest rainforest in the island after El Yunque National Forest. Centered around the Santa Ana Peak, also known as Monte del Estado. Incl. Monte del Estado ecological park and recreational areas, waterfalls and charcos, and the Maricao Fish Hatchery. Designated Important Bird Area. (C, G, H, O, P, S, W)
13	Monte Choca		Corozal	2003	238		Tropical moist forest. Officially one of the 20 state forests owned by the DRNA but this one is locally managed by the Civic and Cultural Recreational Club of Palos Blancos. (G, H, O, R, W)
14	Nuevo Milenio		San Juan	1998	388		Urban secondary forest. Research forest used to study the effects of hurricanes on tropical forests. Part of the Northern Puerto Rico karst and the San Juan Ecological Corridor. Bordered by the University of Puerto Rico Botanical Garden. (R)
15	Piñones		Carolina and Loiza	1975	1,515		Largest state-managed mangrove forest. Also, home to a subtropical forest, lagoons, sand dunes and marine ecosystems. Last home of the rare and endangered araña tree. (C, G, K, O, P, R, S, W)
16	Rio Abajo		Arecibo and Utuado	1943	5,607		Subtropical moist forest and mogotes (karstic hills) in the Northern Puerto Rico karst, home to numerous caves and sinkholes. Critical Puerto Rican parrot reintroduction area. Designated component of the Karso del Norte Important Bird Area, and a National Natural Landmark since 1980. (G, H, O, R, W)
17	San Patricio		San Juan	2000	68		Urban secondary forest centered around the Mogote de San Patricio. Research forest used to study reforestation in urban areas. Part of the Northern Puerto Rico karst. (G, O, R, W)
18	Susúa		Sabana Grande and Yauco	1935	3,241		Important transition zone between the tropical dry forest and the tropical rainforest in the foothills of the Cordillera Central. Home to the endangered Puerto Rican nightjar. Designated Important Bird Area. (G, H, O, P, R, W)
19	Toro Negro		Ciales, Jayuya, Juana Diaz, Orocovis and Ponce	1934	7,968		Subtropical moist forest centered around the Toro Negro massif of the Cordillera Central that contains the highest peaks in Puerto Rico, including Cerro de Punta. Incl. protected natural reserves and recreational areas. Designated component of the Cordillera Central Important Bird Area. (B, C, F, G, H, K, O, P, S, W)
20	Vega		Vega Alta and Vega Baja	1975	1,150		Subtropical moist forest and mogotes (karstic hills) in the Northern Puerto Rico karst. Only a small section is open to the public. Designated component of the Karso del Norte Important Bird Area. (G, O, R, W)

Key:
B = Boating
C = Camping
F = Fishing
G = Photography
H = Hiking
K = Kayaking
O = Nature Observation
P = Picnicking
R = Scientific Research
S = Swimming
W = Bird Watching

== See also ==
- List of National Natural Landmarks in Puerto Rico
- List of national forests of the United States
  - El Yunque National Forest
- Protected areas of Puerto Rico
