= Aguirre State Forest =

State forest in Puerto Rico

Coordinates: 17.9433010°N 66.1684998°W

Aguirre State Forest Spanish: Bosque Estatal de Aguirre
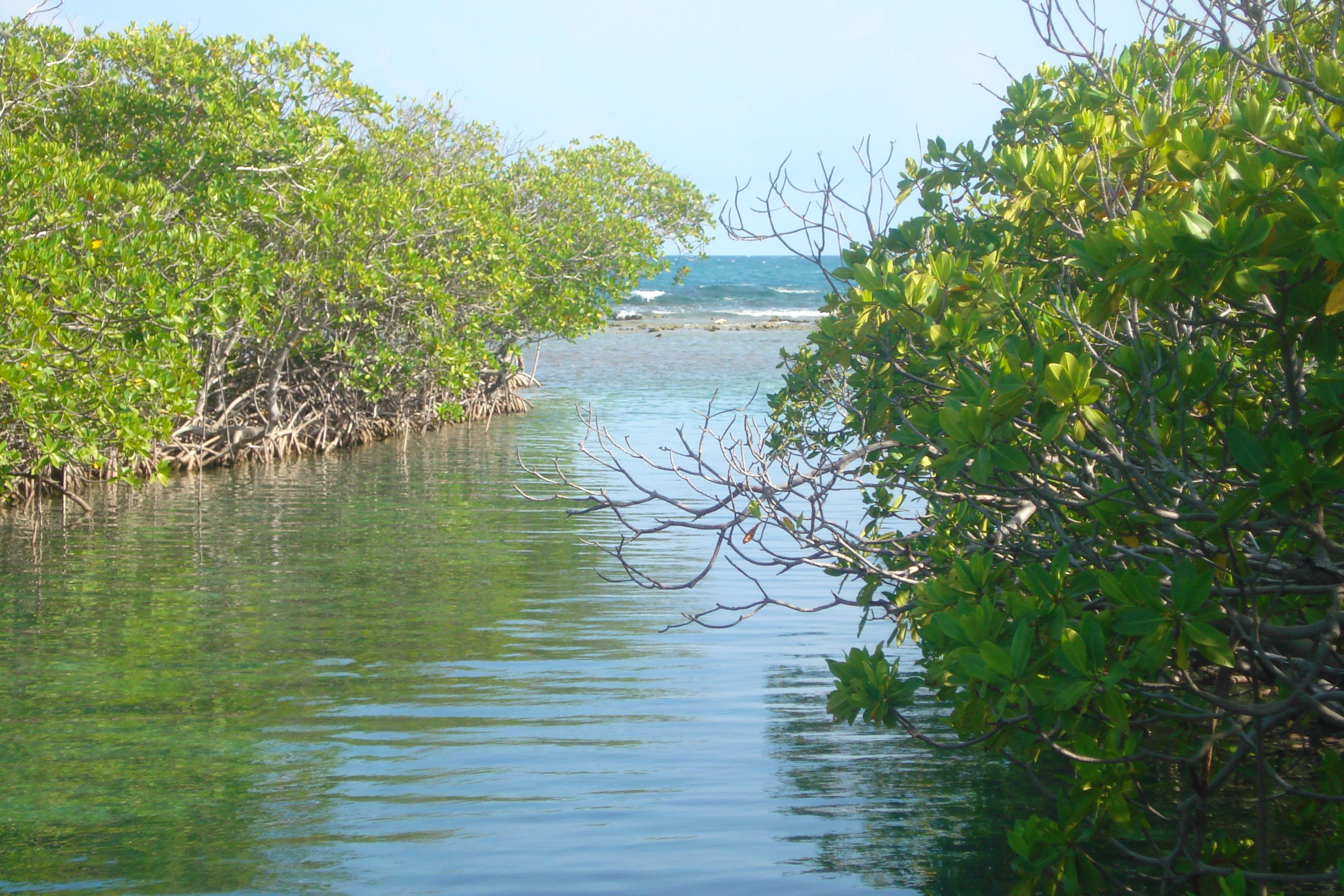
- Cayo Matías

Geography
- Location: Guayama, Santa Isabel
- Elevation: 4 feet (1.2 m)
- Area: 2,464 acres (2,537 cda)

Administration
- Status: Public, Commonwealth
- Governing body: Puerto Rico Department of Natural and Environmental Resources (DRNA)
- Website: www.drna.gobierno.pr

Ecology
- WWF Classification: Greater Antilles mangroves

The Aguirre State Forest (in Spanish: Bosque Estatal de Aguirre) is a 2,393-acre (9.68 km^{2}) nature reserve on the south coast of Puerto Rico and one of the commonwealth's 20 state forests. It mainly consists of mangrove coasts, keys and floodplain forests, and it borders the Jobos Bay National Estuarine Research Reserve. The Aguirre State Forest is owned and administered by Puerto Rico. It was established in 1918 by Puerto Rico governor Arthur Yager to protect the mangrove forests areas between the municipalities of Guayama and Santa Isabel (Punta Petrona).

== Natural features ==
The state forest is named after the nearby Central Aguirre, a historic sugarcane plantation and refinery, and the barrio of Salinas of the same name. The forest is notable for its dense mangrove forests and salt ponds. As such it is an ecologically diverse area that is home to 13 species of reptiles, 4 species of amphibians and 3 species of bats. Manatees can also be observed in the lagoons located in and around the forest.

As part of the Jobos Bay Important Bird Area, Aguirre State Forest has been recognized by BirdLife International as an important marine and terrestrial bird area since 2007. At least 184 bird species can be found within the forest and the area is also an important bird nesting site. Some notable bird species found here are yellow-crowned night herons (Nyctanassa violacea), white-cheeked pintails (Anas bahamensis), yellow warblers (Setophaga petechia), and endangered birds such as yellow-shouldered blackbirds (Agelaius xanthomus). Additionally, a breeding population of red-crowned parrots (Amazona viridigenalis) has been living in the forest and the nearby Central Aguirre area since the second half of the 20th century.

The types of mangroves found within the state forest are white mangrove (Laguncularia racemosa), black mangrove (Avicennia germinans), red mangrove (Rhizophora mangle) and buttonwood (Conocarpus erectus). Batis maritima, Sesuvium portulacastrum and Sporobolus virginicus are the main grass species found in the area, particularly around the tropical salt ponds and keys.

The protected areas of the forest also include the Punta Pozuelo protected natural area, managed by the Conservation Trust of Puerto Rico, and the Punta Petrona nature reserve, located in the municipality of Santa Isabel.

== Recreation ==
The forest is offers opportunities for birdwatching, nature walks, camping and kayaking in designated areas. Most of the visitors' amenities are found in Laguna El Toconal of Jobos, Guayama. Additional visitors' information, interpretation and activities can be found at the Jobos Bay National Estuarine Research Reserve headquarters in Aguirre, Salinas.

== Gallery ==
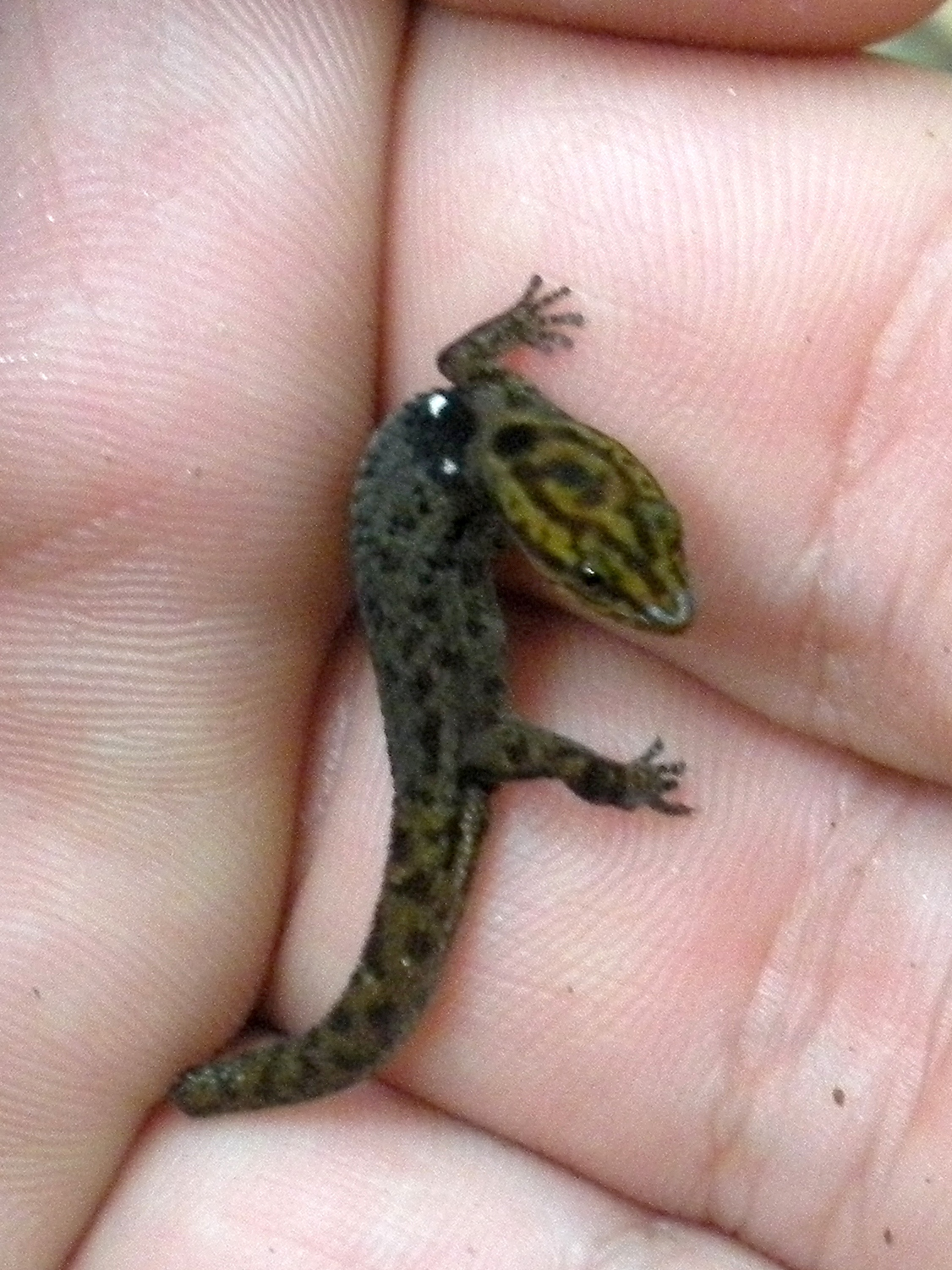
Sphaerodactylus macrolepis

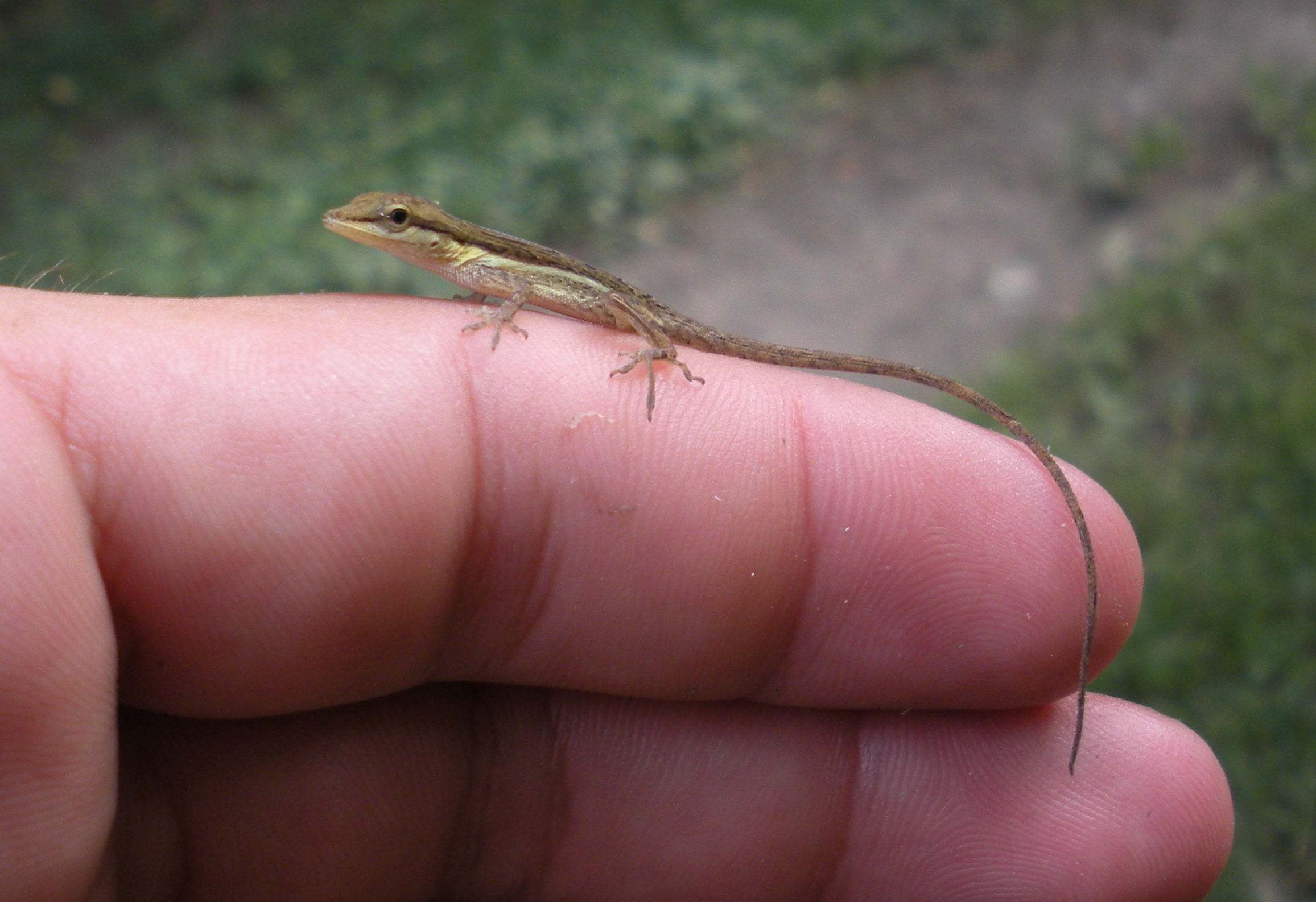
Anolis pulchellus

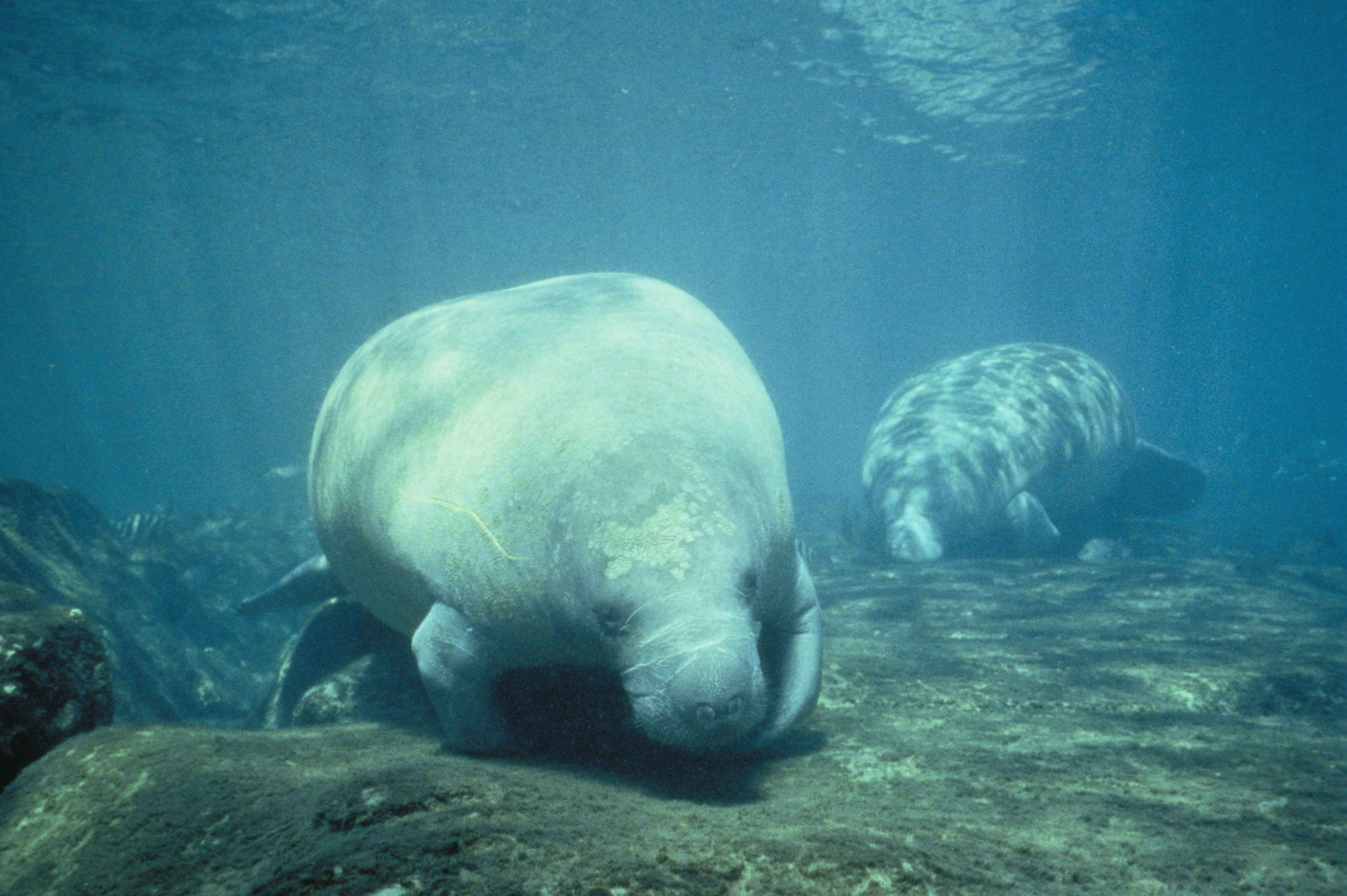
West Indian manatees can be found in the state forest.

== See also ==
- Ceiba State Forest
- List of Puerto Rico state forests
- List of National Natural Landmarks in Puerto Rico
