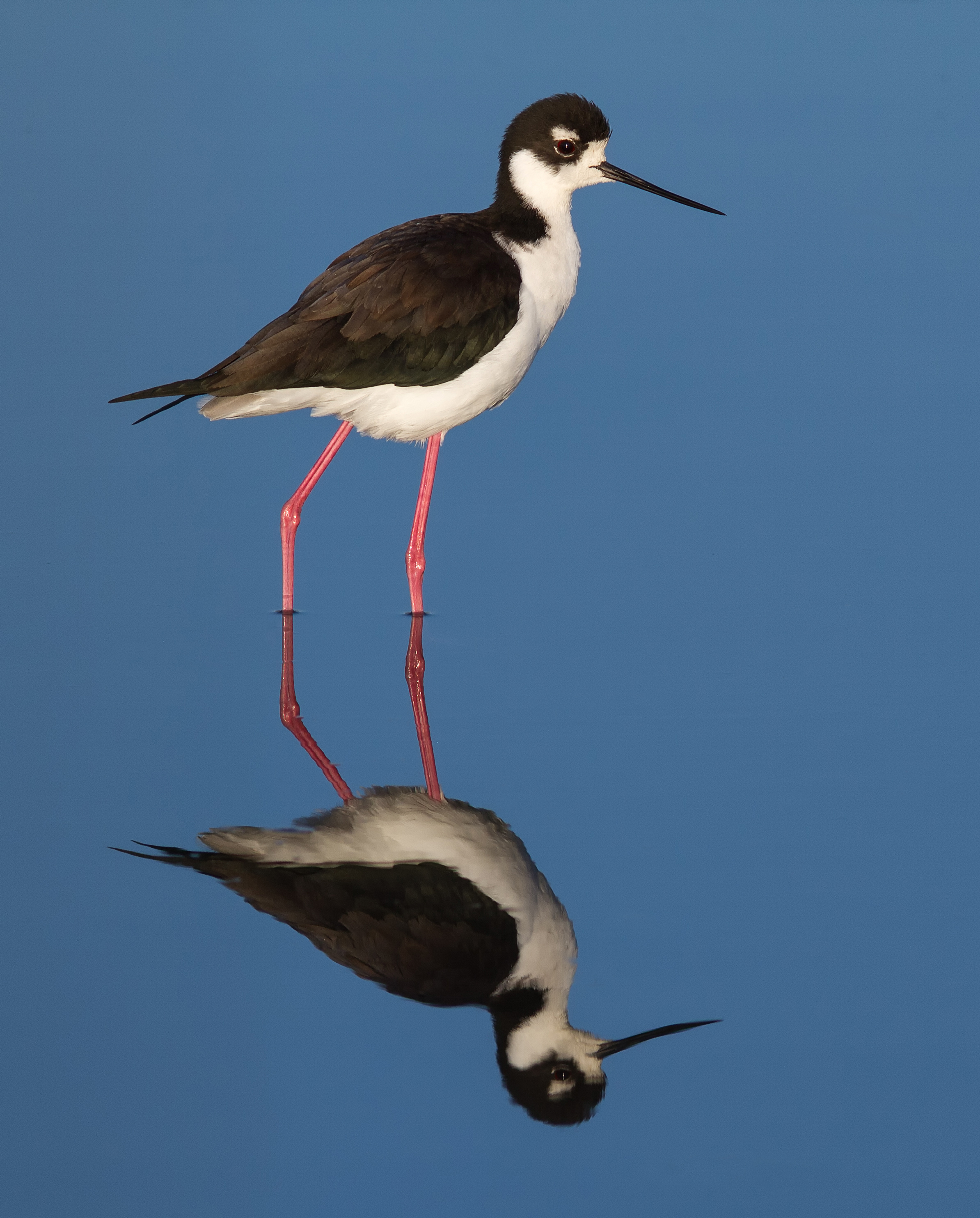
- Adult near Corte Madera, California

Scientific classification
- Kingdom: Animalia
- Phylum: Chordata
- Class: Aves
- Order: Charadriiformes
- Family: Recurvirostridae
- Genus: Himantopus
- Species: H. mexicanus

Binomial name
- Himantopus mexicanus (P.L.S.Müller, 1776) (but see text)
- Range of black-necked stilt (including white-backed stilt of most of South America, see text) Breeding Migration Year-round Non-breeding

Synonyms
- Himantopus himantopus mexicanus (Müller, 1776) but see text

= Black-necked stilt =

Species of bird

The black-necked stilt (Himantopus mexicanus), also called the pied stilt, is a locally abundant shorebird of North and South American wetlands and coastlines. It is found from the coastal areas of California through much of the interior western United States and along the Gulf of Mexico as far east as Florida, then south through Central America and the Caribbean to Brazil, Peru and the Galápagos Islands, with an isolated population, the Hawaiian stilt, in Hawaii. The northernmost populations, particularly those from inland, are migratory, wintering from the extreme south of the United States to southern Mexico, rarely as far south as Costa Rica; on the Baja California peninsula it is only found regularly in winter. Some authorities, including the IUCN, treat it as a synonym of Himantopus himantopus.

== Taxonomy ==
The black-necked stilt was formally described in 1776 as Charadrius mexicanus by the German zoologist Philipp Statius Müller. The species is now placed in the genus Himantopus that was introduced in 1760 by the French ornithologist Mathurin Jacques Brisson.

Three subspecies are recognised:

- H. m. knudseni Stejneger, LH, 1887 – main Hawaiian Islands
- H. m. mexicanus (Müller, PLS, 1776) – breeds inland south-central Canada (sporadic) locally eastward through south-central US and southward to southwestern coastal Peru and Galápagos; also coastal Venezuela to northeastern Brazil and throughout West Indies; winters inland central California, coastal Gulf of Mexico and Florida southward
- H. m. melanurus Vieillot, LJP, 1817 – inland central Peru and Bolivia and southeastern Brazil to southcentral Chile and Argentina

The subspecies H. m. melanurus has sometimes been considered as a separate species, the white-backed stilt.

The black-necked stilt has often been treated as a subspecies of the common or black-winged stilt, using the trinomial name Himantopus himantopus mexicanus. However, the AOS has always considered it a species in its own right, and the scientific name Himantopus mexicanus is often seen. Matters are more complicated though; sometimes all five distinct lineages of the common stilt are treated as different species. The white-backed stilt from much of South America (H. melanurus when the species is recognized) is parapatric and intergrade to some extent with its northern relative where their ranges meet in northern Brazil and central Peru, would warrant inclusion with the black-necked stilt when this is separated specifically, becoming Himantopus mexicanus melanurus. Similarly, the Hawaiian stilt, H. m. knudseni, belongs to the (North) American species when this is considered separate; while it rarely has been treated as another distinct species, the AOS, BirdLife International and the IUCN do not.

== Description ==
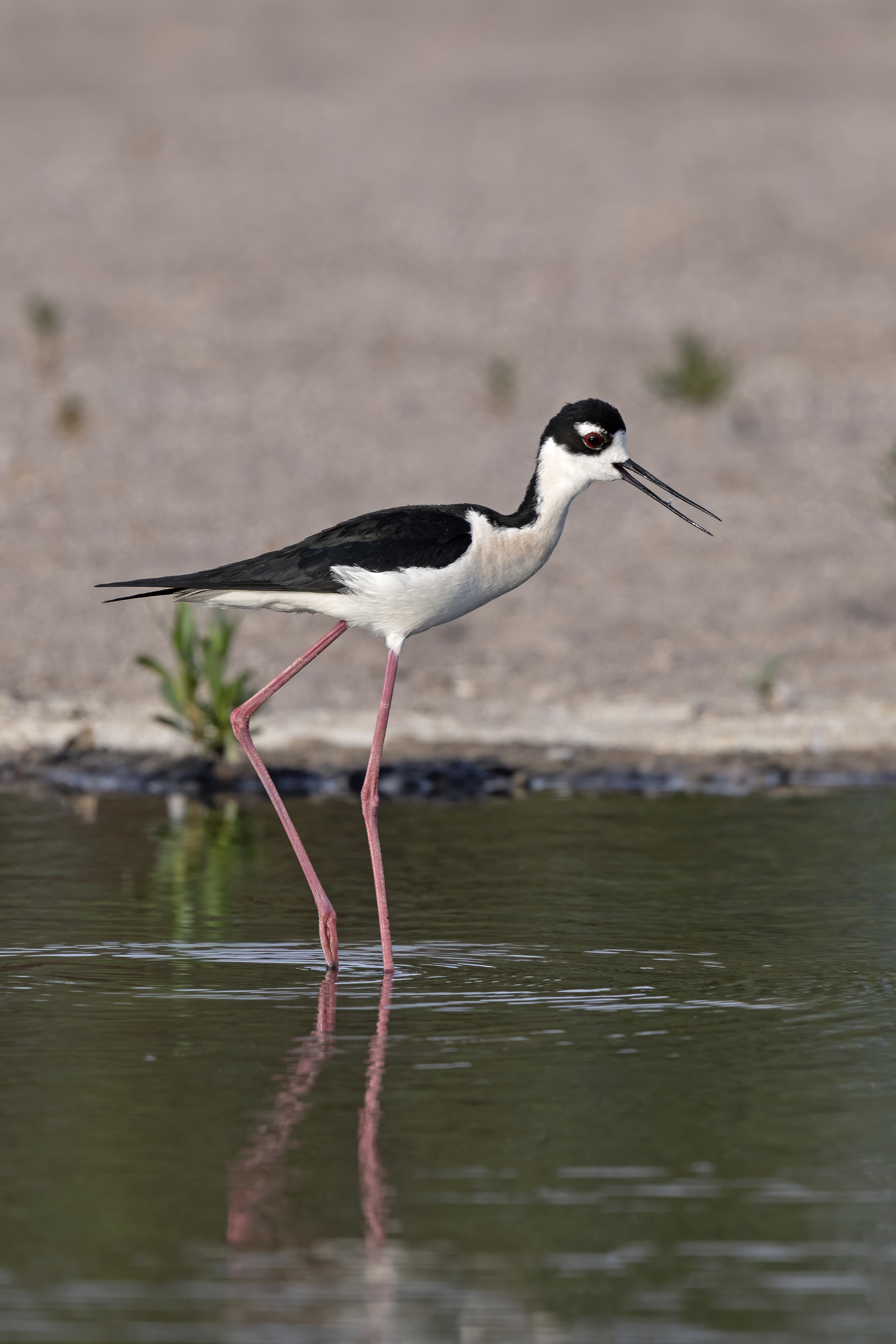
Black-necked stilt in the Rio Grande in Las Cruces, New Mexico

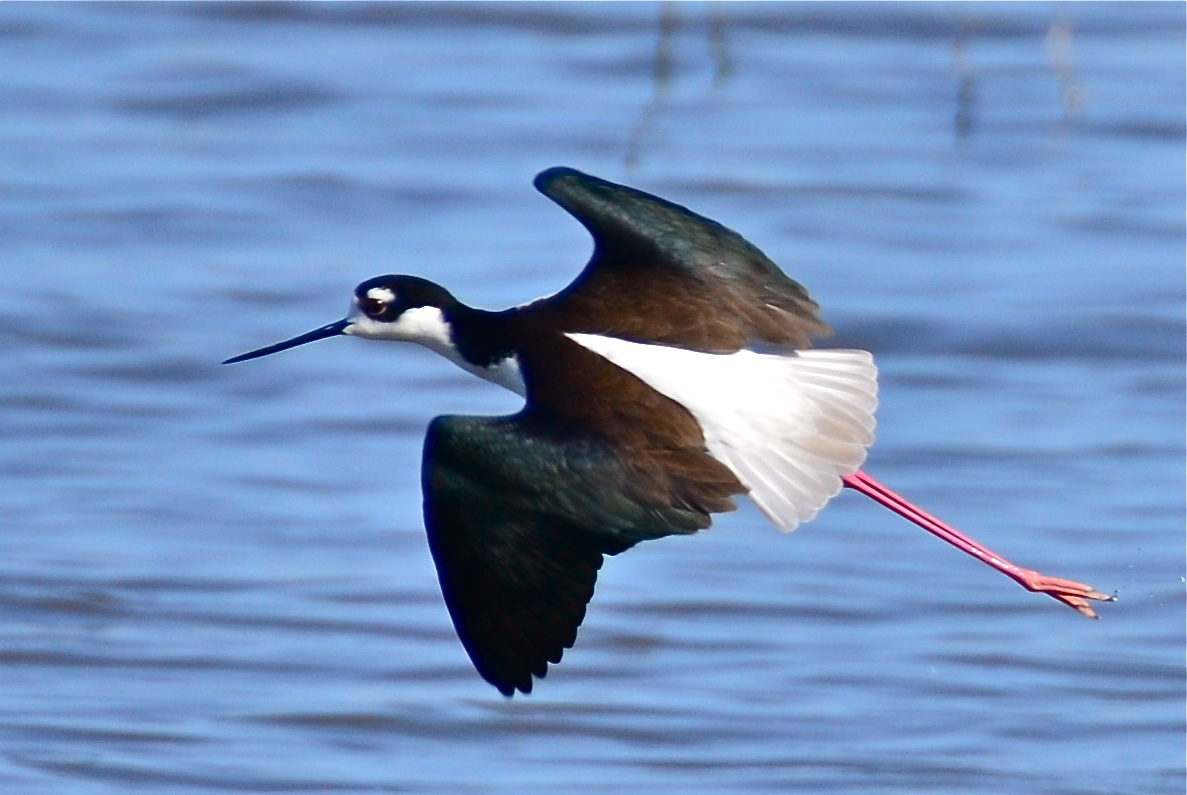
Flying in California, US

Black-necked stilt calls
Calls from an agitated black-necked stilt in Palo Alto, California

Measurements:

- Length: 13.8–15.3 in (35–39 cm)
- Weight: 5.3–6.2 oz (150–180 g)
- Wingspan: 28.1–29.7 in (71–75 cm)

They have long pink legs and a long thin black bill. They are white below and have black wings and backs. The tail is white with some grey banding. A continuous area of black extends from the back along the hind neck to the head. There, it forms a cap covering the entire head from the top to just below eye-level, with the exception of the areas surrounding the bill and a small white spot above the eye. Males have a greenish gloss to the back and wings, particularly in the breeding season. This is less pronounced or absent in females, which have a brown tinge to these areas instead. Otherwise, the sexes look alike.

Downy young are light olive brown with lengthwise rows of black speckles (larger on the back) on the upperparts – essentially where adults are black – and dull white elsewhere, with some dark barring on the flanks.

Where their ranges meet in northern Brazil and central Peru, the black-necked and white-backed stilts intergrade. Such individuals often have some white or grey on top of the head and a white or grey collar separating the black of the hindneck from that of the upper back.

The black-necked stilt is distinguished from non-breeding vagrants of the black-winged stilt by the white spot above the eye. Vagrants of the northern American form in turn are hard to tell apart from the resident Hawaiian stilt, in which only the eye-spot is markedly smaller. But though many stilt populations are long-distance migrants and during their movements can be found hundreds of miles offshore, actual trans-oceanic vagrants are nonetheless a rare occurrence.

== Distribution and habitat ==
The black-necked stilt is found in estuarine, lacustrine, salt pond and emergent wetland habitats; it is generally a lowland bird but in Central America has been found up to 8,200 ft (2,500 m) ASL and commonly seen in llanos habitat in northern South America. It is also found in seasonally flooded wetlands. Use of salt evaporation ponds has increased significantly since 1960 in the US, and they may now be the primary wintering habitat; these salt ponds are especially prevalent in southern San Francisco Bay. At the Salton Sea, the black-necked stilt is resident year-round. They are known to prefer shallow, saline wetlands, including those which are soda or alkaline.

This bird is locally abundant in the San Joaquin Valley, where it commonly winters. It is common to locally abundant in appropriate habitat in southern California from April to September.

It also breeds along lake shores in northeastern California and southeastern Oregon as well as along the Colorado River. In North America outside California, the black-necked stilt rarely breeds inland, but it is known as a breeding bird in riparian locales in Arizona and elsewhere in the southern US. In Arizona, black-necked stilts may be seen along artificially created lakes and drainage basins in the Phoenix metropolitan area, in remnant riparian habitat.

For flocks that summer in the northern Central Valley of California, a migration occurs to the San Joaquin Valley to consolidate with flocks that were already summering there. In coastal areas flocks both summer and winter in these estuarine settings.

Fall migration of the northernly birds takes place from July to September, and they return to the breeding grounds between March and May. Usually, the entire population breeding at any one site arrives, mates, incubates eggs for about a month, and protects and broods the young until they are capable of sustained flight (at 27–31 days old) and leaves again migrating in flocks of about 15 individuals sometimes juveniles congregating in small groups and other times siblings with family groups. There is some seasonal movement of the tropical populations, but this is not long-range and poorly understood.

The parasitic cyclocoeline flatworm Neoallopyge americanensis was described from the air sacs of a black-necked stilt from Texas. Its genus is presently monotypic and seems to be closely related to the similar genus Allopyge, found in Old World cranes.

== Behaviour ==
This bird is considered to have a moderate tolerance for human disturbance. They are typically found at elevations below 1,600 metres (5,250 ft).

=== Food and feeding ===
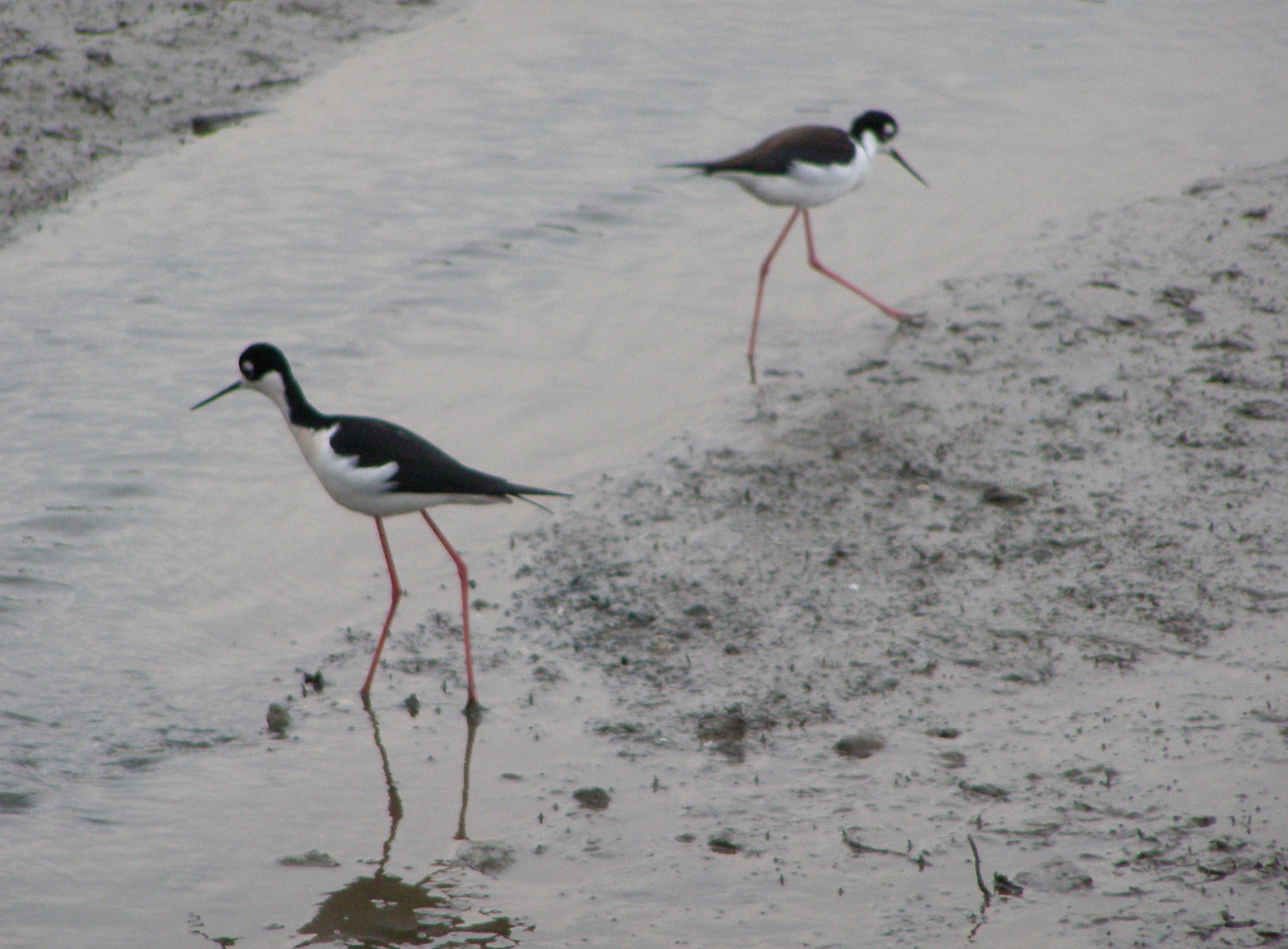
Black-necked stilts foraging on Richardson Bay mudflats

The black-necked stilt forages by probing and gleaning primarily in mudflats and lakeshores, but also in very shallow waters near shores; it seeks out a range of aquatic invertebrates – mainly crustaceans (such as shrimp) and other arthropods (such as worms and flies), and mollusks – and small fish, tadpoles and very rarely plant seeds. Its mainstay food varies according to availability; inland birds usually feed mainly on aquatic insects and their larvae, while coastal populations mostly eat other aquatic invertebrates. For feeding areas they prefer coastal estuaries, salt ponds, lakeshores, alkali flats and even flooded fields. For roosting and resting needs, this bird selects alkali flats (even flooded ones), lake shores, and islands surrounded by shallow water.

=== Breeding ===
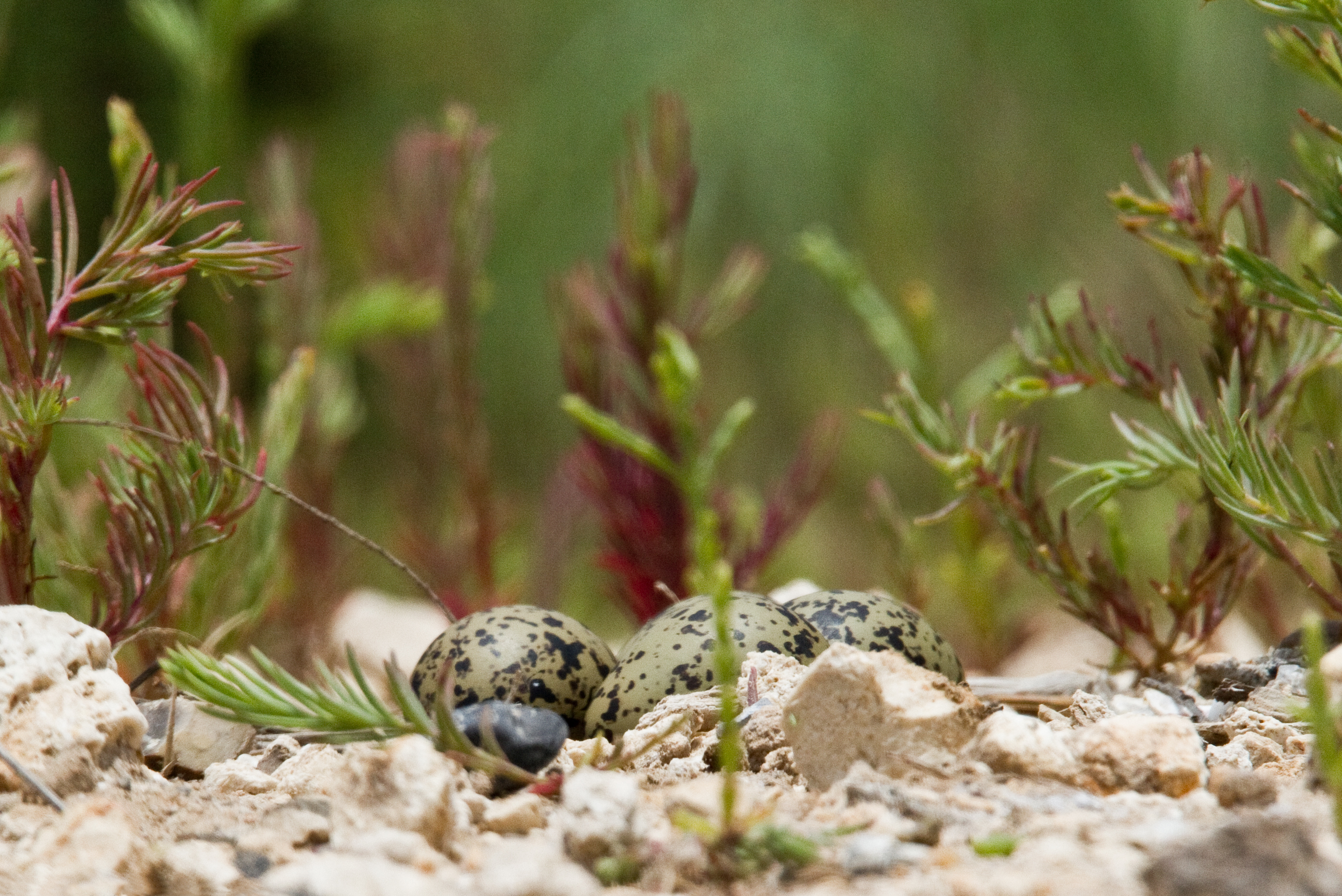
Black-necked stilt eggs Quintana, Texas

This stilt chooses mudflats, desiccated lacustrine verges, and levees for nest locations, as long as the soil is friable. Reproduction occurs from late April through August in North America, with peak activity in June, while tropical populations usually breed after the rainy season. The nests are typically sited within 1 km (0.62 mi) of a feeding location, and the pairs defend an extensive perimeter around groups of nests, patrolling in cooperation with their neighbors. Spacing between nests is approximately 65 ft (20 m), but sometimes nests are within 7 ft (2.1 m) of each other and some nests in the rookery are as far as 130 ft (40 m) from the nearest neighbor. The black-necked stilt is actually classified as semicolonial since the nests are rarely found alone and colonies usually number dozens, rarely hundreds of pairs. The nests are frequently established rather close to the water edge, so that their integrity is affected by rising water levels of ponds or tides. This is particularly a hazard in the case of managed salt ponds where water levels may be altered rapidly in the salt pond flooding process.

The clutch size generally is 3–5 eggs with an average of four. For 22–26 days both sexes take turns incubating the eggs. The young are so precocial that they are seen swimming within two hours after hatching and are also capable of rapid land velocity at that early time. In spite of this early development the young normally return to the nest for resting for one or two more days. They fledge after about one month but remain dependent on their parents for some more weeks. Birds begin to breed at 1–2 years of age.

=== Visual Adaptations ===
The visual functions of these stilts are split between sides – their left eye is used to identify predators, competitors, and mates, while their right eye's vision functions to locate and acquire prey.

== Conservation status ==
Particularly the North American populations of the black-necked stilt have somewhat declined in the 20th century, mainly due to conversion of habitat for human use and pollution affecting both the birds directly as well as their food stocks. But altogether, the population is healthy and occurs over a large range. This stilt is therefore classified as a Species of Least Concern by the IUCN. The Hawaiian stilt, which on occasionally has been separated as a distinct species, is very rare however and numbers less than 2,000 individuals. Predation by the small Indian mongoose (Urva auropunctata), introduced to hunt rats, is suspected to have contributed to its decline.

== Gallery ==
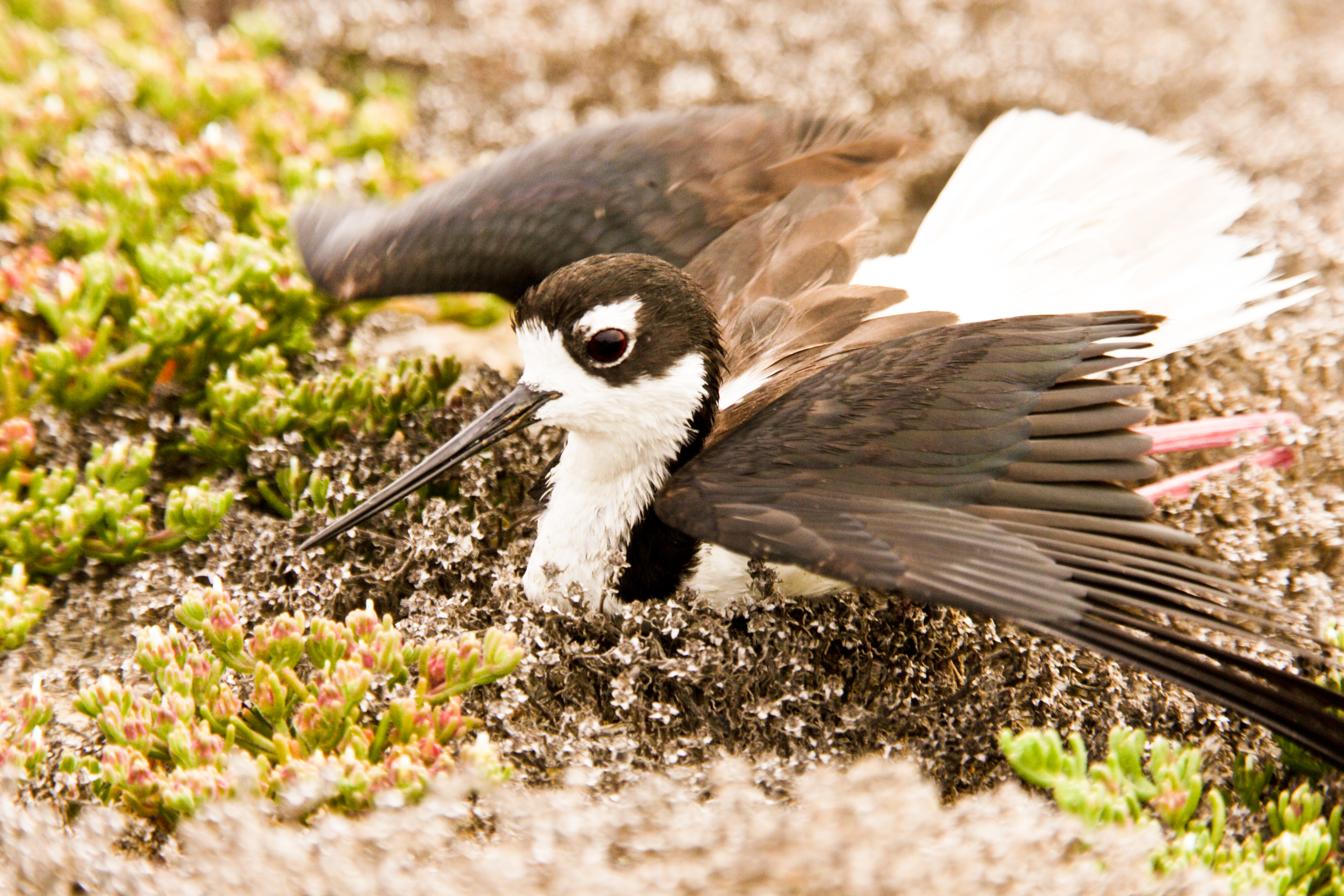
Stilts exhibit a weak or sick behavior in order to distract predators from the location of their young.

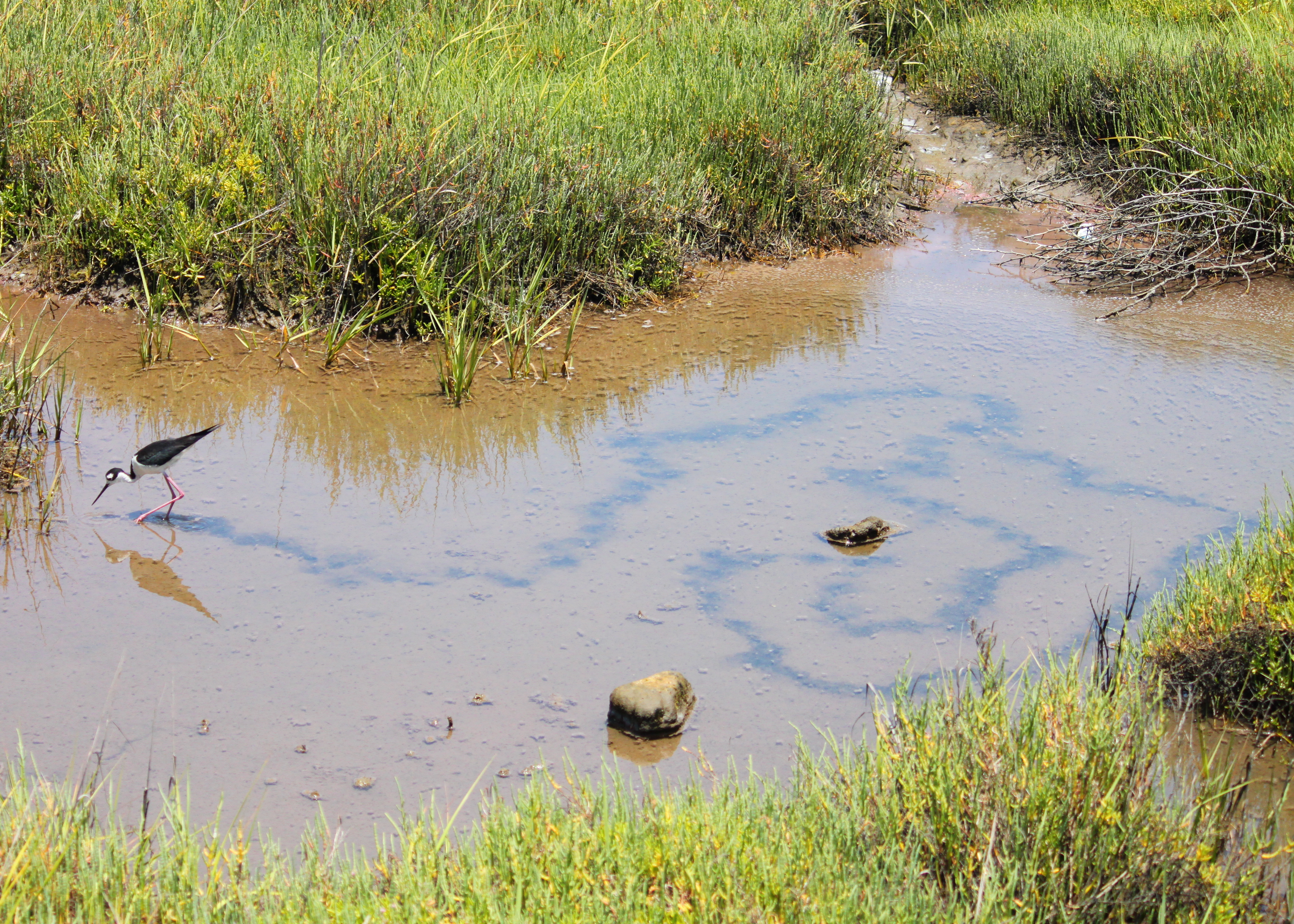
Bolsa Chica Ecological Reserve

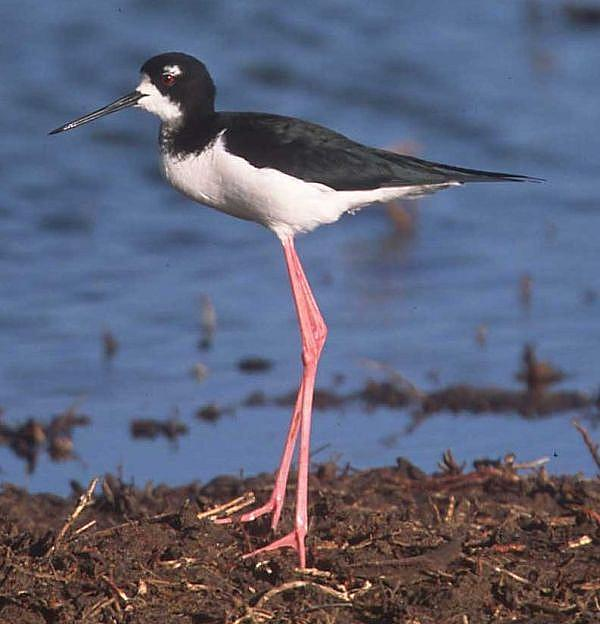
The Hawaiian stilt is usually considered a subspecies of the black-necked stilt.

== Sources ==
- Bent, A.C. (1927). "Life Histories of North American Shorebirds: Order Limicolae (Part I)". Bulletin of the U.S. National Museum. 142: 1–420.
- BirdLife International (BLI) [2008]: Black-necked Stilt Species Factsheet. Retrieved 2008-SEP-24.
- Brattstrom, Bayard H. & Howell, Thomas R. (1956). "The Birds of the Revilla Gigedo Islands, Mexico" (PDF). Condor. 58 (2): 107–120. doi:10.2307/1364977. JSTOR 1364977.
- Corman, T. & Wise-Gervais, C. (2005): Arizona Breeding Bird Atlas. University of New Mexico Press.
- Dronen, Norman O.; Gardner, Scott L. & Jiménez, F. Agustín (2006). "Selfcoelum limnodromi n. gen., n. sp. (Digenea: Cyclocoelidae: Cyclocoelinae) from the long-billed dowitcher, Limnodromus scolopaceus (Charadriiformes: Scolopacidae) from Oklahoma, U.S.A." (PDF). Zootaxa. 1131 (1): 49–58. doi:10.11646/zootaxa.1131.1.3.
- Garrett, K. & Dunn, J. (1981): Birds of Southern California. Los Angeles Audubon Society.
- Hamilton, Robert Bruce (1975). "Comparative Behavior of the American Avocet and the Black-necked Stilt (Recurvirostridae)" (PDF). Ornithological Monographs. 17 (17): 1–98. doi:10.2307/40166701. JSTOR 40166701.
- Harrison, Colin (1978): A field guide to the nests, eggs and nestlings of North American birds. W. Collins and Company, Cleveland, Ohio.
- Hays, Warren S.T. & Conant, Sheila (2007). "Biology and Impacts of Pacific Island Invasive Species. 1. A Worldwide Review of Effects of the Small Indian Mongoose, Herpestes javanicus (Carnivora: Herpestidae)". Pacific Science. 61 (1): 3–16. doi:10.1353/psc.2007.0006. hdl:10125/22595. S2CID 86338152.
- McCaskie, G.; DeBenedictus, D.; Erickson, R. & Morlan, J. (1979): Birds of Northern California, an annotated field list (2nd ed.). Golden Gate Audubon Society, Berkeley, California.
- Ransom, Kay et al. (1984): Environmental Impact Report for the Corinthian Villas Project on Richardson Bay. Report prepared for the city of Mill Valley by Earth Metrics Inc.
- Rigney, M. & Rigney, T. (1981): A breeding bird survey of the south San Francisco Bay salt pond levee system. U.S. Department of the Interior, Fish and Wildlife Service, San Francisco Bay National Wildlife Refuge special report
- Robinson, Julie A., J. Michael Reed, Joseph P. Skorupa and Lewis W. Oring. (1999). Black-necked Stilt (Himantopus mexicanus), The Birds of North America Online (A. Poole, Ed.). Ithaca: Cornell Lab of Ornithology. Birds of North America.
- Sibley, David Allen (2003): The Sibley Field Guide to Birds of North America. Alfred A. Knopf, New York ISBN 067945120X.
- Sordahl, T. A. 1980. Antipredator behavior and parental care in the American Avocet and Black-necked Stilt (Aves: Recurvirostridae). Phd Thesis. Utah State Univ. Logan.
- Zeiner, David C.; Laudenslayer, William F. & Meyer, Kenneth E. (eds.) (1988): California Wildlife (Vol. 2 Birds). California Department of Fish and Game.
