= Ceiba State Forest =

State forest in Puerto Rico

Coordinates: 18.32°N 65.63°W

Ceiba State Forest Spanish: Bosque Estatal de Ceiba
- Aerial view of Ceiba State Forest.
- Interactive map of Ceiba State Forest

Geography
- Location: Ceiba and Fajardo
- Elevation: 10 feet (3.0 m)
- Area: 352 acres (362 cda)

Administration
- Status: Public, Commonwealth
- Authority: Puerto Rico Department of Natural and Environmental Resources (DRNA)
- Website: www.drna.gobierno.pr

Ecology
- WWF Classification: Greater Antilles mangroves

Ceiba State Forest (Spanish: Bosque Estatal de Ceiba), which also includes the Ceiba Nature Reserve (Reserva Natural de Ceiba), is a mangrove forest and nature reserve located in the eastern coast of Puerto Rico, in the municipalities of Ceiba and Fajardo. The forest extends over 350 acres and is mostly made of mangrove forests which are habitat to a large number of bird species. Although named Ceiba State Forest, the forest is not home to the large ceiba tree (Ceiba pentandra), and it is actually named after one of the municipalities it is located in. In addition to the mangrove forests, the reserve also includes coastal zones that comprise sandy beaches and coral reefs which can be found in both the Ceiba and Fajardo sections.

The Medio Mundo y Daguao Protected Natural Area, managed by the Conservation Trust of Puerto Rico (Para la Naturaleza), is also located within the forest reserve boundaries. Playa Los Machos is a popular white sand beach and snorkeling site located within the reserve.

== History ==
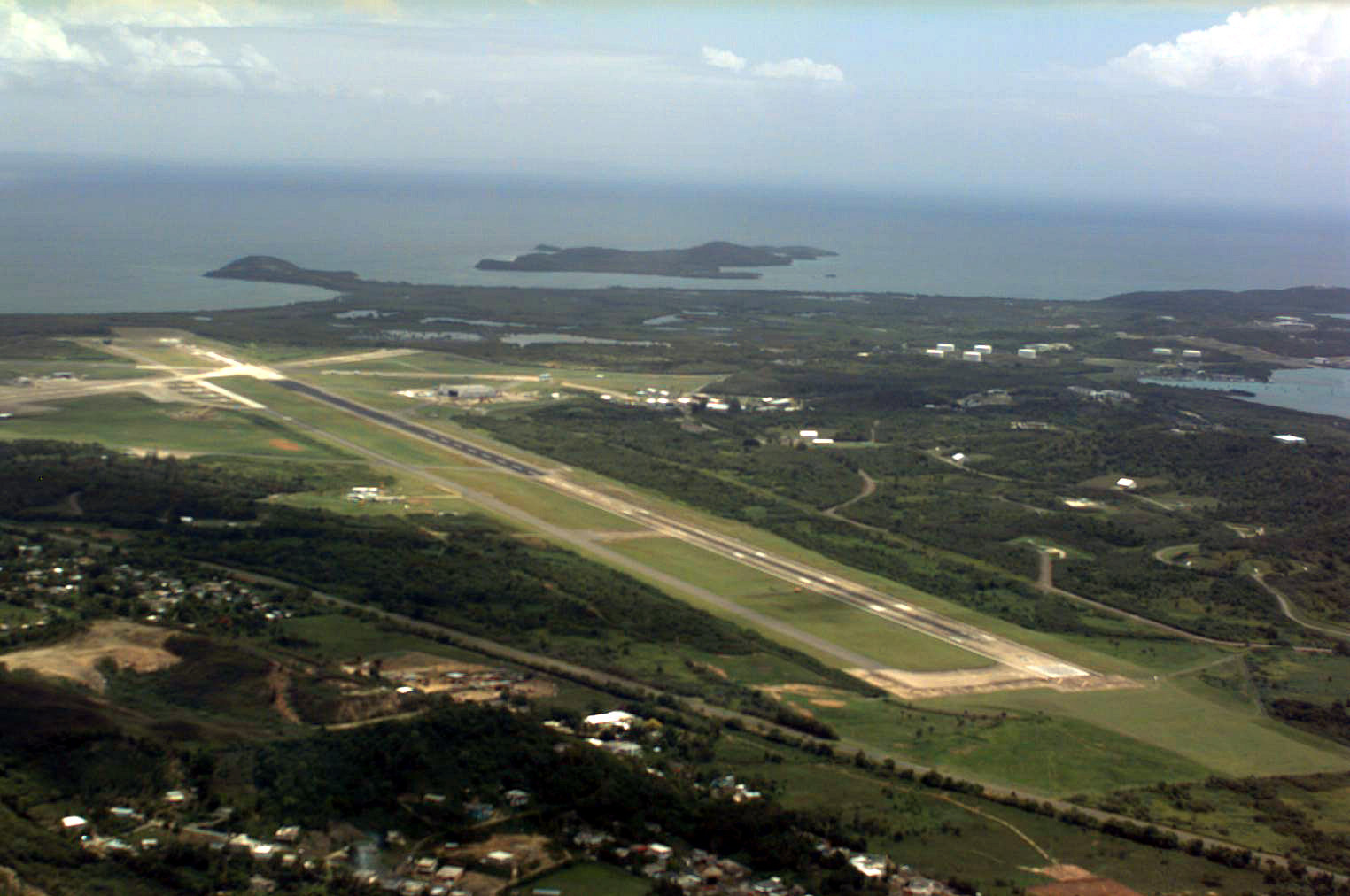
A portion of the reserve was transferred to the Roosevelt Roads Naval Station in 1941.

The forest's ecological value has been recognized since 1918, when Puerto Rico governor Arthur Yager proclaimed and designated mora than 800 acres of coastal mangrove forest between the municipalities of Fajardo and Naguabo.

In 1941, the Puerto Rican government transferred a large portion of this zone and granted it to the federal government for the development of Roosevelt Roads Naval Station. In 1979, the Puerto Rico Department of Natural and Environmental Resources (DRNA) then designated the remaining portion as an irreplaceable forest reserve based on its biological, cultural and historical importance and legacy through executive order OE-1996-57. After Roosevelt Roads was closed down there have been pushes to integrate sections of the former naval station and of the Punta Figueras area into the state forest.

The forest was recognized as an Important Bird Area by BirdLife International in 2007 due to its importance as a biodiverse wetland habitat for numerous marine and terrestrial bird species. The nature reserve designated portion of the state forest is categorized as 1a strict nature reserve by the International Union for Conservation of Nature.

== Geography ==
=== Climate ===
The average annual precipitation in the reserve is 1,312 mm of rain per year, and its average temperatures are of 26.1C. The driest month in the forest is February and the most humid season is analogous to the wet season between the months of May to September.

=== Geology ===
About 95% of the ground in the forest reserve is covered by mangrove. Most of the year the soil in the reserve is found under sea water, and most of the soils are classified as marsh or wetland soil. These types of soil are characterized for being argillaceous, saline and organic (influenced by the presence of mangroves). There are two other types of soil found in the reserve: lomic sandy soil found in the beach areas, and the loamy clay silt found throughout the parts of the forest that are not submerged. All types of soil in the reserve are of high acidity and salinity.

== Ecology ==
American flamingos at Los Machos Lagoon.

=== Flora ===
The forest is home to all four types of mangrove forest found in Puerto Rico: red mangrove (Rhizophora mangle), black mangrove (Avicennia germinans), white mangrove (Laguncularia racemosa) and buttonwood or button mangrove (Conocarpus erectus). Saltwort (Batis maritima) is also very common in the area. Seagrass can be found in the maritime areas of the reserve and it is a source of food and refuge for numerous animal species. Vegetation is rarer in the salt marshes.

=== Fauna ===
Mangrove forests such as this are ideal for numerous species of fish, birds and crustaceans. The forest is also home to a large number of bird species such as the Bahama pintail (Anas bahamensis), the West Indian whistling duck (Dendrocygna arborea) and the endangered yellow-shouldered blackbird (Agelaius xanthomus). A large number of migratory bird species, both breeding and non-breeding populations, can also be found in the reserve. The forest and surrounding maritime areas are also home to the West Indian manatee, the population of which is still classified as endangered in Puerto Rico. The increasing frequency of Caribbean flamingos (Phoenicopterus ruber) within the Ceiba forest reserve in recent years has been noted by environmental researchers from the University of Puerto Rico, Humacao as a positive sign of the revitalization of coastal wetlands in the area, which in the past hosted large flocks of this species.

== See also ==
- Aguirre State Forest
- List of Puerto Rico state forests
