= Torre de Piedra =

- Observation Tower
- U.S. National Register of Historic Places
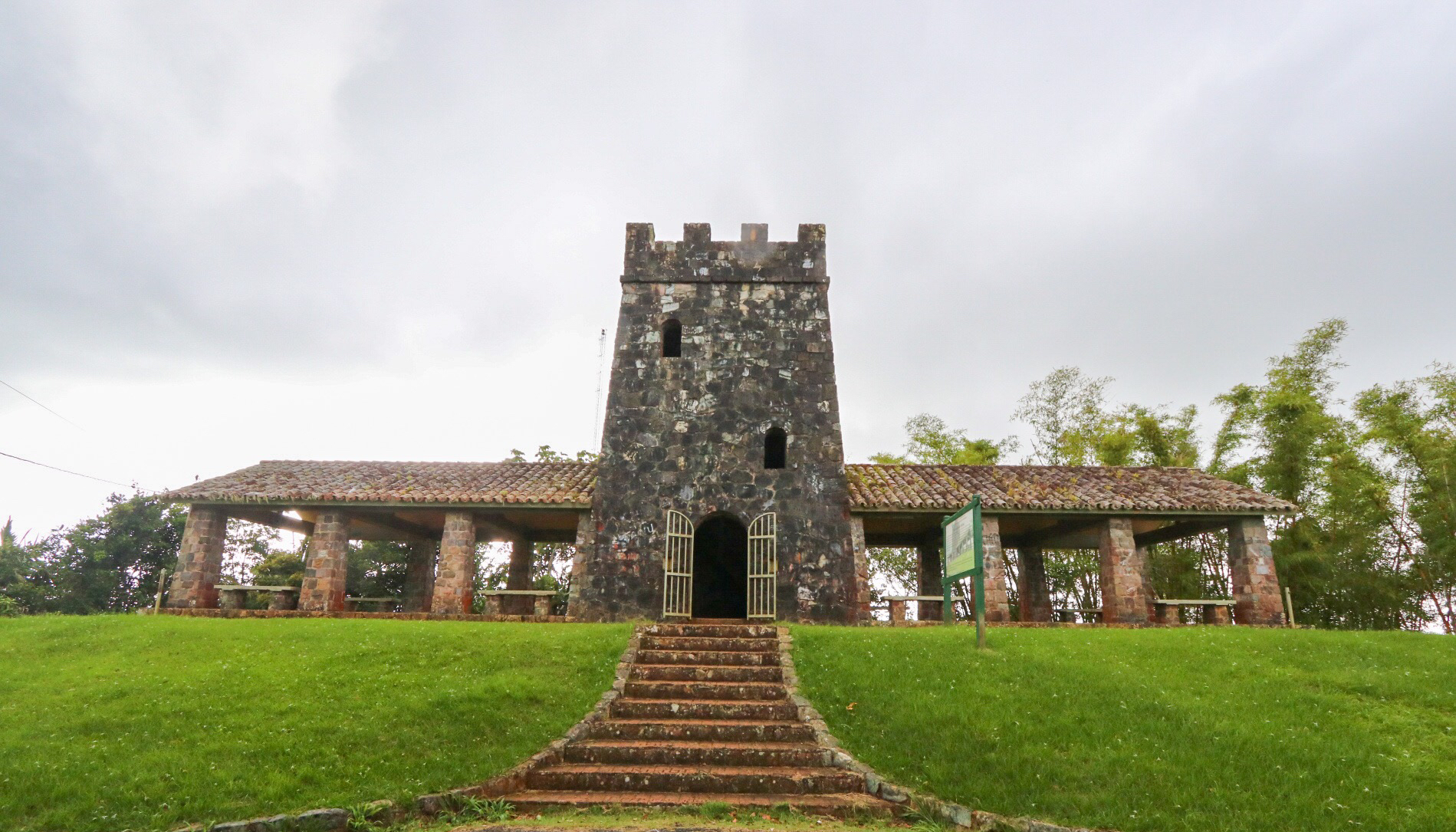
- Torre de Piedra, 2018

- Location within Puerto Rico
- Location: Caín Alto, San Germán, Puerto Rico
- Coordinates: 18°08′40″N 66°58′48″W
- Built: 1940
- Architect: Civilian Conservation Corps
- Architectural style: Bungalow/Craftsman
- NRHP reference No.: 16000236
- Added to NRHP: May 1, 2016

The Santa Ana Observation Tower (Spanish: Torre de observación de Santa Ana), better known as the Stone Tower (La Torre de Piedra), is an approximately 30 feet tall observation tower located at the summit of Monte del Estado, Santa Ana Peak, at the boundary between the municipalities of San Germán and Maricao, within the Maricao State Forest in southwestern Puerto Rico.

The tower was built in 1940 by the Civilian Conservation Corps, who were also responsible for the building of trails, camps and infrastructure in other parks such as El Yunque and Toro Negro. It was added to the National Register of Historic Places in 2016 along with other properties across Puerto Rico under the listing of New Deal Era (1931–1942) Constructions in the Forest Reserves of Puerto Rico.
