= Bahía de Jobos =

National reserve in Puerto Rico

Coordinates: 17°57′27.26″N 66°13′20.13″W

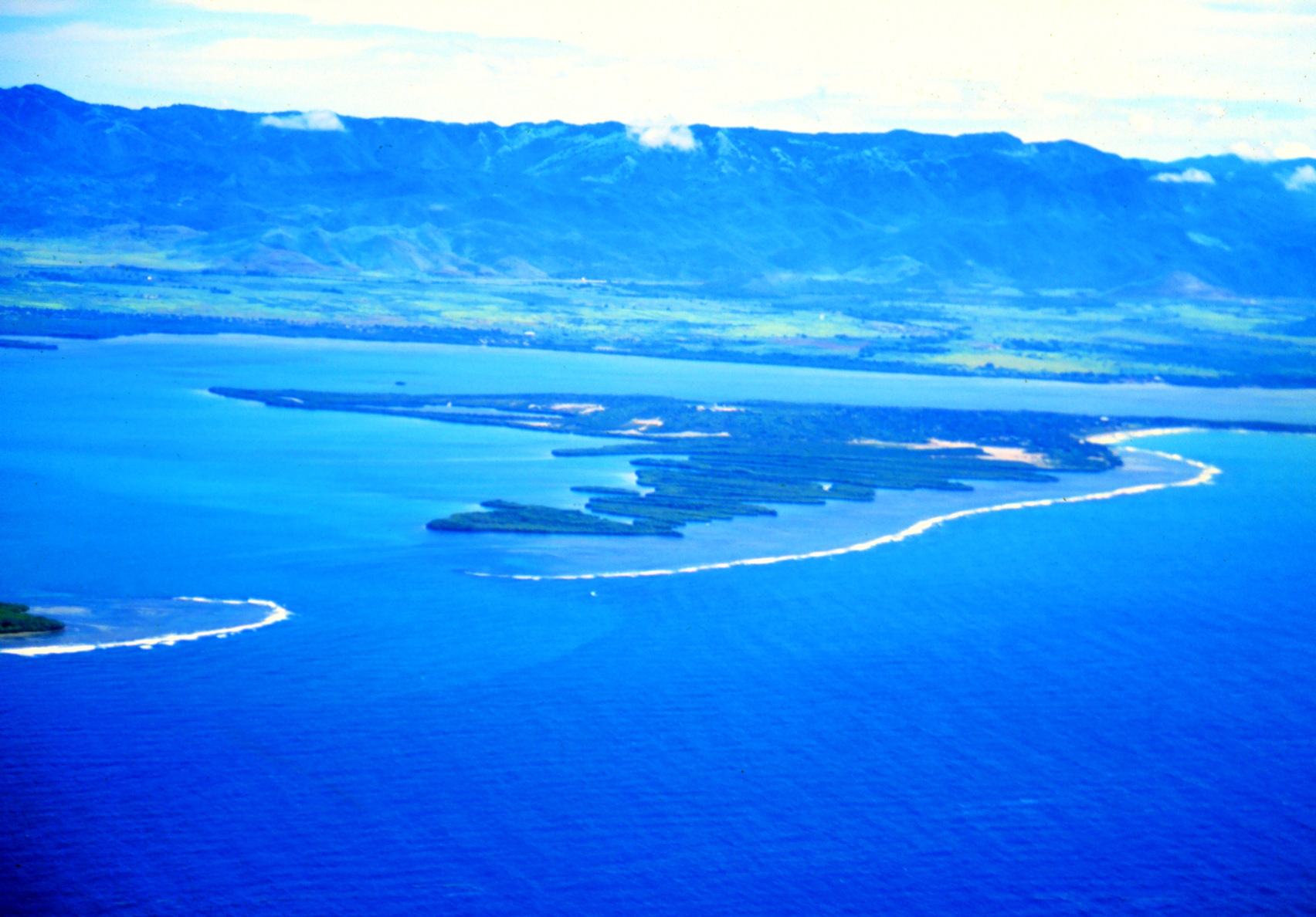
Puerto Rico, Bahía de Jobos

Jobos Bay (Spanish: Bahía de Jobos) is a protected bay located in the Puerto Rican municipalities of Guayama and Salinas. It is the second largest estuary of Puerto Rico, after the Bay of San Juan, and the largest bay along the southern coast of the island. Jobos Bay is protected as the Jobos Bay National Estuarine Research Reserve (JBNERR) or Reserva Natural de Investigación Estuarina de Bahía de Jobos in Spanish, located within the Aguirre barrio of the municipality of Salinas. The southeastern sections of Bahía de Jobos are protected as part of the Aguirre State Forest in the Jobos barrio of the municipality of Guayama.

The bay is an intertidal tropical ecosystem dominated by seagrass beds, coral reefs, and mangroves. In an area of 1,140 hectares (2,800 acres), the reserve contains five distinct habitat types and provides sanctuary to several endangered species. Bahía de Jobos is one of 28 reserves that comprise the National Oceanic and Atmospheric Administration’s (NOAA) National Estuarine Research Reserve System. The reserve is operated in conjunction with the Puerto Rico Department of Natural and Environmental Resources (DRNA).

== History ==
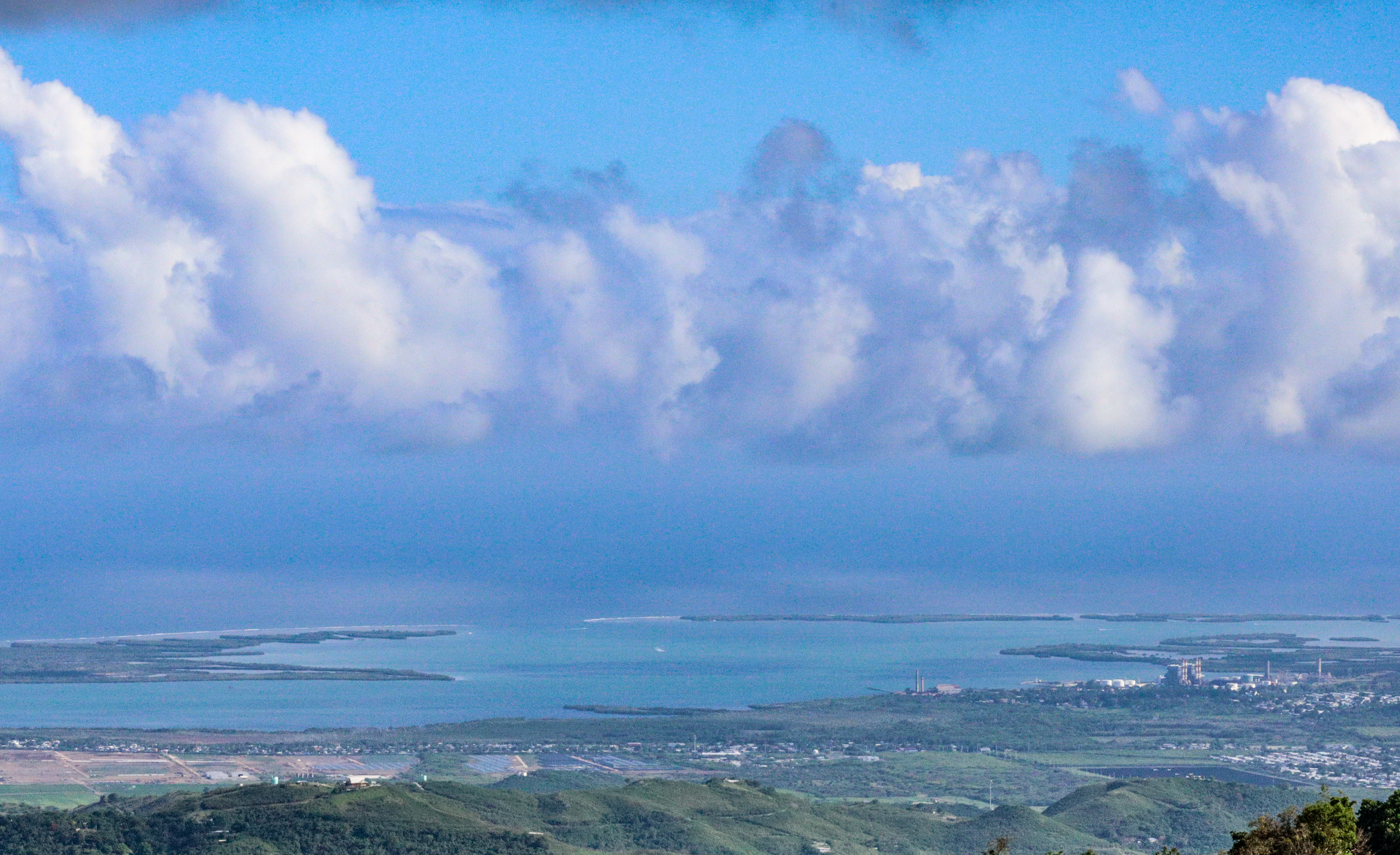
Jobos Bay from Cercadillo, Cayey

The mangrove-forested western section of Jobos Bay was protected by governor Arthur Yager in 1918. At the time of the establishment of the protected area, most of the land in the reserve was owned by a private company which leased the land to the Aguirre Corporation, which operated an extensive sugarcane farm and sugar mill in the region, spearheaded by the Central Aguirre sugarcane plantation and refinery. After the bust of the sugar industry in the island, Aguirre closed in 1980 and the land remains owned by the private corporation.

The entirety of the land had been initially offered to the Commonwealth of Puerto Rico but because of financial troubles the purchase never concluded. The land remained under federal public-private ownership until Bahía de Jobos was then established as a National Estuarine Sanctuary in 1981. At the time, the private lands remained the only undeveloped bay lands in the entire island, consisting of close to 160 hectares (400 acres) and more than 4 kilometres (2.5 mi). The agreement established that the private sections around the JBNERR property can be developed for commercial and private use. A new corporation, Jobos Bay Properties, Inc., was established in 2017 to administer the sale of the land.

Since the 1980s, land-use in the areas surrounding JBNERR has continued to change. The Corporacion Amoros private reserve borders the now commonwealth-owned Aguirre State Forest to the east, while a fishing village (Las Mareas) grew to the west. Due to the rapid urbanization in the region and shifting irrigation practices, watershed dynamics have changed significantly since the beginning of the 21st century. The Abey Nature Reserve was established in 2023 by the government of Puerto Rico to preserve the formerly farmed lands along northern basin section of the bay (now a secondary forest) to function as a buffer zone between the bay and the agricultural lands to the north. About 30 families who have squatted on the land were facing eviction in 2022.

== Ecology ==
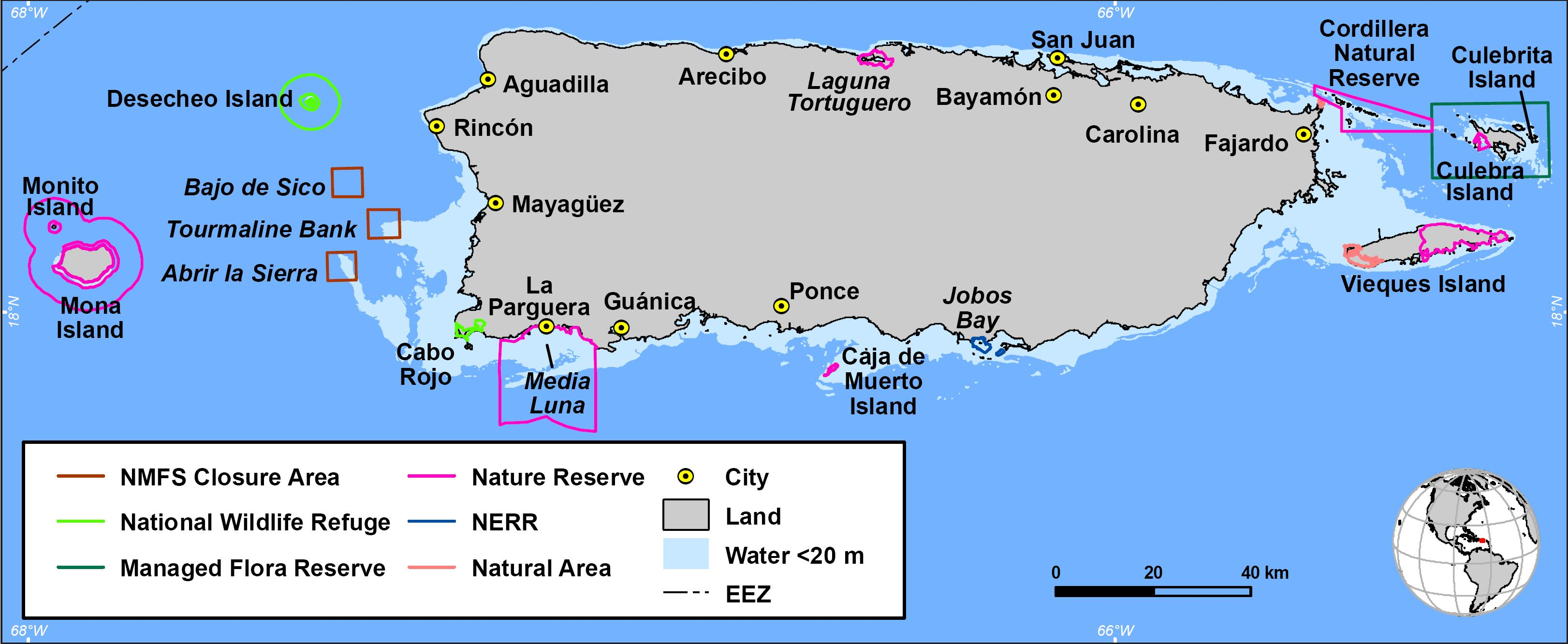
Coral Reef Ecosystem of Puerto Rico

Jobos Bay is a exemplary tropical estuary with five distinct habitat types grading roughly from the ocean landward: coral reefs, seagrass beds, mangrove forests, mudflats and evergreen littoral forests. Jobos is the second largest estuary in Puerto Rico by total area, and the largest (by a factor of three) by total coastline. The Jobos mangroves are estimated to comprise 42.6% of that habitat type on the south coast of Puerto Rico.

At least seven endangered animal species can be found at Bahía de Jobos: the yellow-shouldered blackbird (Agelaius xanthomus), the hawksbill sea turtle (Eretmochelys imbricata), the leatherback sea turtle (Dermochelys coriacea), the West Indian manatee (Trichechus manatus), mountainous star coral (Orbicella faveolata), elkhorn coral (Acropora palmata) and staghorn coral (Acropora cervicornis). A critical habitat designation was granted particularly for the green sea turtle and the manatee.

The area is notable for its abundance of bird species and, along with neighboring Aguirre State Forest, it was proclaimed an Important Bird Area by BirdLife International in 2007. Notable bird species found in the area include the yellow-billed cuckoo (Coccyzus americanus) and the Caribbean elaenia (Elaenia martinica). In addition to the numerous wetland bird species, the reserve hosts numerous migratory birds every winter such as reddish egrets (Egretta rufescens), golden plovers (Pluvialis dominica), white-romped sandpipers (Calidris fuscicollis), western sandpipers (Calidris mauri) and knots (Calidris canutus).

== Recreation ==
Jobos Bay is a popular place for boating and fishing, particularly the numerous keys and islets located along the southern portion of the bay. Along with the neighboring Aguirre mangrove forest, the high biodiversity of JBNERR attracts numerous birders every year. The reserve itself hosts hiking trails, observation towers and boardwalks, in addition to a visitor center located in the former community event center of the Central Aguirre Historic District.

== See also ==
- National Estuarine Research Reserve System
- National Oceanic and Atmospheric Administration
- Estuary
