= Tropical salt pond ecosystem =

Buffer zone between terrestrial and marine ecosystems

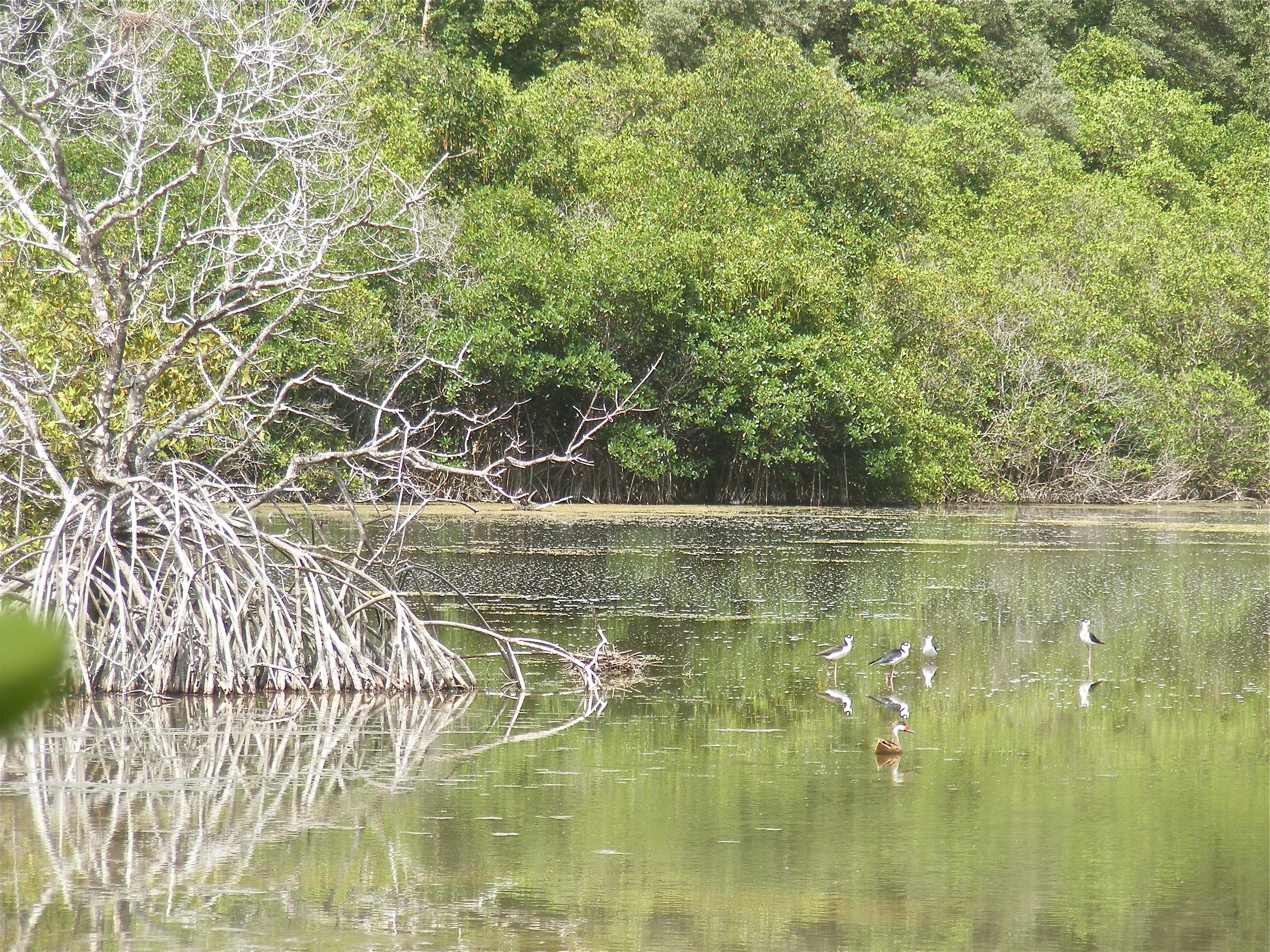
Perseverance Bay Salt Pond, St. Thomas, USVI

Salt ponds are a natural feature of both temperate and tropical coastlines. These ponds form a vital buffer zone between terrestrial and marine ecosystems. Contaminants such as sediment, nitrates and phosphates are filtered out by salt ponds before they can reach the ocean. The depth, salinity and overall chemistry of these dynamic salt ponds fluctuate depending on temperature, rainfall, and anthropogenic influences such as nutrient runoff. The flora and fauna of tropical salt ponds differ markedly from those of temperate ponds. Mangrove trees are the dominant vegetation of tropical salt pond ecosystems, which also serve as vital feeding and breeding grounds for shore birds.

== Formation and cycle ==
Tropical salt ponds form as bays are gradually closed off with berms of rubble from the reef. Mangroves grow atop the berms, which gradually close off the area to create a salt pond. These typically form at the base of watersheds with steep slopes, as sediments transported during storm events begin to fill in and cover up the rubble berm. Mangroves may grow over the berm, also contributing to the isolation of the salt pond. Typically, the ponds communicate with the open sea through ground seepage. Evaporation and precipitation cycles in salt ponds create variable environments with wide ranges of salinity and depth. Due to depth and temperature fluctuation salt pond could be classified as hyposaline 3-20 ppt, mesosaline 20-50 ppt, or hypersaline with ppt greater than 50. Another important aspect of salt ponds is their permanence. Salt ponds can eventually become filled in over time, and transition into an extension of the land. Some are intermittent ponds due to predictable dry and wet seasons while others are episodic (if the region has highly unpredictable weather).

== Flora and fauna ==
Organisms typically found in and around tropical salt ponds include cyanobacteria, marine invertebrates, birds, algae and mangrove trees. For example, a typical Caribbean salt pond is the permanent or part-time home to the following:

=== Microorganisms ===
- Bacteria, especially cyanobacteria such as
  - Coccochloris stagnina
  - Microcoleus chthonoplastes
  - Oscillatoria
  - Phormidium
- Ciliates

=== Invertebrate animals ===
- Rotatoria (rotifers)
- Worms including
  - Nematoda (round worms)
  - Polychaeta (segmented worms)
- Cnidaria (cnidarians)
- Gastropoda (snails and clams)
- Crustacea
  - Cladocera (water fleas)
  - Ostracoda (seed shrimp)
  - Copepoda (copepods)
  - Anostraca (brine shrimp), especially Artemia
  - Decapoda (crabs) such as Ocypodidae (fiddler crab)
- Insecta (insects) such as
  - Ephydridae (brine fly)
  - Corixidae (water boatmen)

=== Vertebrate animals ===
- Fish such as mullet (Mugil)
- Birds such as
  - Yellow Legs (Tringa spp.)
  - Black Necked Stilts (Himantopus mexicanus)
  - Wilson’s Plovers (Charadrius wilsonia)
  - Pin Tail Ducks (Anas bahamensis)
- Bats

=== Plants ===
- Algae such as Enteromorpha
- Vascular plants
  - Ruppia grass
  - Mangrove trees

== Salt pond mangroves ==
There are 110 species of mangroves found worldwide all with special adaptations that allow for them to inhabit salt ponds. Mangroves are often found near or around salt ponds because of their ability to exist in an ecosystem with high salinity, low dissolved oxygen levels, brackish water, and extreme temperatures. Mangroves’ unique prop roots function as a barrier to the salt water, limiting water loss, and acting as a snorkel for oxygen and nutrients. Mangroves seeds have also evolved to be buoyant and germinate while still attached to the parent increasing the chance of survival in difficult environments. The presence of mangroves augments and helps maintain many of the benefits provided by salt ponds, such as:

- Mangrove salt ponds provide habitat for migratory species and critical nursery habitat for threatened and endangered species.
- Mangrove trees filter run off from upland sources.
- Mangrove trees absorb wave energy during tropical storms
- Mangrove trees provide a source of nutrients via leaf litter
- Mangrove trees hold in soil loads during periods of fierce precipitation

Caribbean salt ponds commonly host three types of mangroves:

- Rhizophora mangle (red mangroves) are very common around salt ponds and are tremendous at dissipating wave energy and providing habitat for developmental organisms due to their large prop roots.
- Avicennia germinans (black mangrove) is easily identifiable by numerous finger like projections, called pneumatophores, allowing them to tolerate high sediment loads.
- Laguncularia racemosa (white mangrove) is dissimilar to red and black mangroves in that it lacks prop roots and pneumatophores but is easily identifiable due to its very round leaves and small wrinkled propagules.

== Ecosystem services ==
Salt ponds provide a number of important ecosystem services.

=== Protection from sediment and storms ===
Salt ponds act as natural sediment traps that limit the amount of sedimentation and pollutants that would otherwise end up in the ocean, potentially harming other ecosystems. Salt ponds are home to dense benthic mats of bacteria which also trap nutrients such as nitrogen that otherwise would greatly contribute to detrimental marine eutrophication. Coral reefs are particularly vulnerable to sedimentation, siltation, and eutrophication processes. Salt ponds and their mangrove systems act as a buffer from storm surges associated with hurricanes and greatly dissipate wave energy that could cause erosion, including even large, rare waves such as tsunamis.

=== Products of salt ponds ===
In addition to these ecosystem services, salt ponds also produce a variety of useful products. Artemia, one of the primary food organisms for aquaculture systems, are cultured in salt ponds. Halophilic green algae can also be cultured in salt ponds to produce glycerol, dried protein that can be fed to livestock, and β–carotene used in dietary supplements. Spirulina is a salt-loving cyanobacterium with a protein content even higher than meat (60%), and it can be cultured in salt ponds. Other halophilic bacteria can be used to produce components used in highly technological processes. Photosynthetic pigment found in Halobacterium halobium is produced commercially and used for optical data processing, non-linear optics and as light sensors. Halophilic bacteria could also be used to produce polyhydroxyalkanoates (PHA) which are biodegradable, water resistant thermoplastics.

== Threats ==
Both anthropogenic and natural threats affect tropical salt ponds.

=== Natural threats ===
Natural threats include hurricanes and other large storms, salinity changes, runoff, sedimentation, and grazing and predation. Hurricanes and other large storms can damage salt pond organisms as well as cause seawater overwash, leading to potentially detrimental salinity changes and physical damage. Salinity may also be reduced by precipitation, which can alter community composition by restricting the number and type of species adapted for these conditions. Furthermore, increased evapotranspiration can increase salinity and diminish species diversity. Local conditions, such as annual rainfall and slope aspect, can determine runoff amounts. Influxes of runoff can cause sediment deposition in salt ponds, eventually causing infill of the pond to occur. Natural grazing and predation around salt ponds can trample vegetation, increase local erosion, and introduce nutrients to the ecosystem.

=== Anthropogenic threats ===
Anthropogenic threats to salt ponds include development and altered hydrology, pollution, erosion, and livestock and agricultural operations, or removed for marinas, harbors, buildings, or other uses. Construction in upland areas also affects salt ponds by causing increased erosion and sedimentation. Pollution is also a major threat to salt ponds. These areas are frequent dumping sites for trash, wastewater, and solid waste. Livestock grazing can not only increase erosion through soil compaction and deforestation, but also introduces fertilizers. Agriculture can also introduce fertilizers and pesticides, causing algal blooms and reduced water quality. Anthropogenic activities, such as fossil fuel burning, can cause increased global temperatures and could lead to the drying of salt ponds. As many of the biological functions of salt ponds are unknown, it would be wise to mitigate potential human impact on these vulnerable ecosystems.
