= Central Aguirre Historic District =

Historic area in Salinas, Puerto Rico

- U.S. National Register of Historic Places
- U.S. Historic district
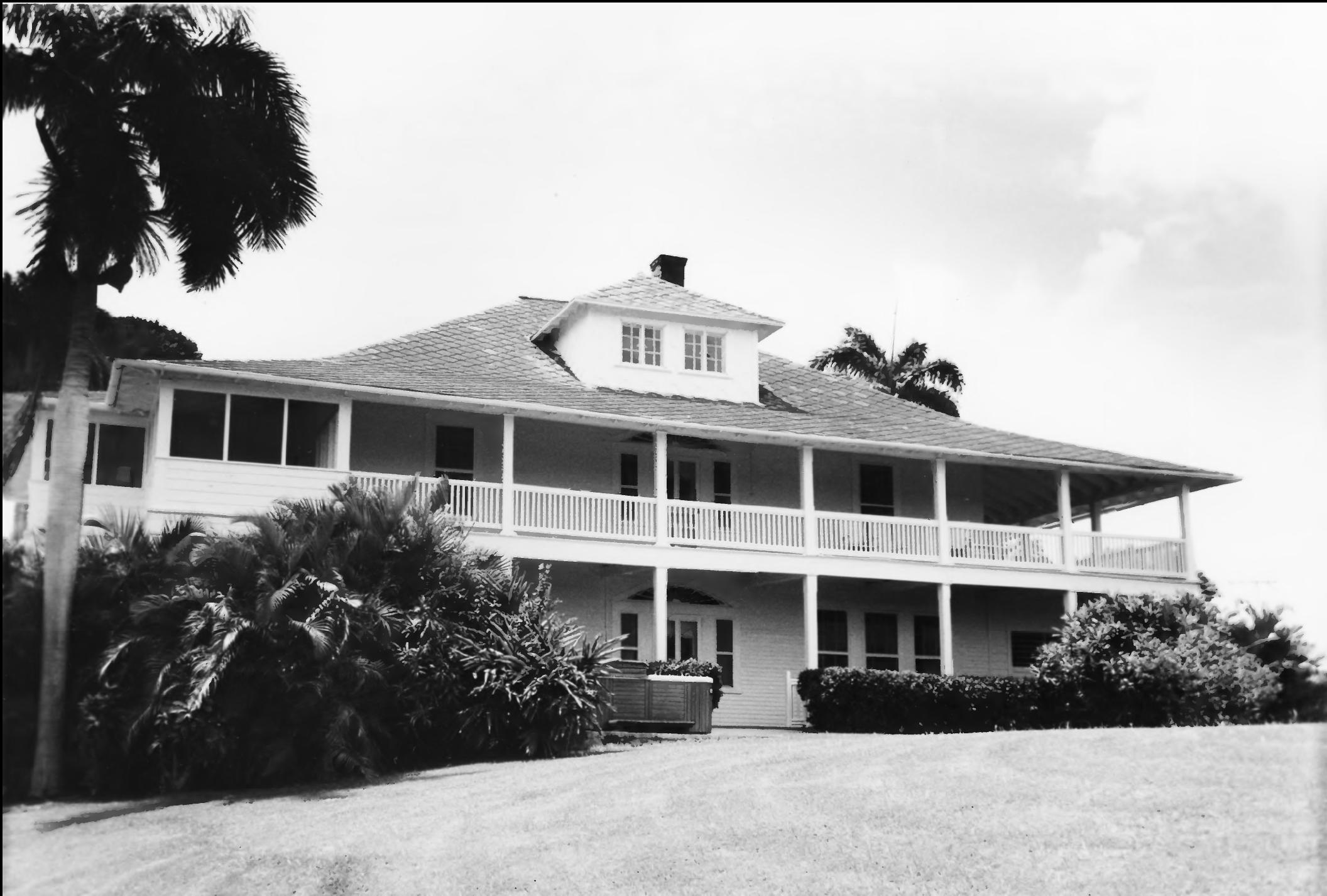
- The Administrator's House (Casa Grande) at Central Aguirre

- Location within Puerto Rico
- Nearest city: Salinas, Puerto Rico
- Area: 326 acres (1.32 km^{2})
- Built: 1899
- Architectural style: Late 19th And Early 20th Century American Movements; traditional industrial
- NRHP reference No.: 02001208"National Register Information System". National Register of Historic Places. National Park Service. November 2, 2013.
- Added to NRHP: October 23, 2002

The Central Aguirre Historic District is a historic company town and industrial complex located in Aguirre, Salinas, Puerto Rico. It was listed on the National Register of Historic Places in 2002. The district encompasses approximately 326 acres and includes more than 300 contributing buildings associated with one of the largest and most significant sugar-producing operations in Puerto Rico during the 20th century.

The district is located on Puerto Rico’s southern coastal plain overlooking Jobos Bay, the largest natural bay on the island’s southern coast.

== History ==
=== Origins and development (mid-19th century–1930s) ===
The site of Central Aguirre originated as Hacienda Aguirre, a mid-19th century sugar estate founded by Antonio José Vázquez and later expanded by the Vázquez Aguilar family. By the late 19th century, the hacienda had grown to more than 2,000 acres and included a steam-powered sugar mill.

Central Aguirre was established beginning in 1899 by a group of Boston-based investors, led by Charles L. Crehore and Francis Dumaresq, who acquired the hacienda shortly after the Spanish–American War. The property included a partly mechanized mill (factoria central) and extensive agricultural lands exceeding 2,000 acres.

The investment firm DeFord & Company played a key role in financing and organizing the enterprise, which expanded through the acquisition and leasing of nearby estates and through contracts with independent growers (colonos).

Due to the scale of the enterprise, the operation was reorganized into the Central Aguirre Syndicate in 1899 and later into the Central Aguirre Sugar Companies, a Massachusetts-based trust with connections to U.S. sugar refining interests, with connections to U.S. sugar refining interests. In 1918, the enterprise was reorganized again as the Central Aguirre Sugar Company, incorporated under Puerto Rican law.

Construction of the modern sugar mill began in 1899 and was largely completed by 1901 at a site near the shores of Jobos Bay, approximately 1.3 kilometers from the original hacienda complex.

The company developed a fully planned industrial complex and company town, including housing, schools, medical facilities, and commercial services. Due to its relatively remote location between Salinas and Guayama, the settlement evolved as a largely self-sufficient community.

The layout of the town reflected early 20th-century planning influences, including elements associated with the Garden city movement. Residential areas were organized into zones reflecting occupational and social hierarchies.

By the early 20th century, Central Aguirre had become one of the largest sugar producers on the island and a major employer in southern Puerto Rico.

=== Labor and social structure ===
Life in Central Aguirre was highly structured and reflected both class and colonial hierarchies. The community was divided into separate residential areas, including sections for American managerial staff and Puerto Rican workers, such as the Montesoria neighborhood. Access to certain facilities was restricted, reinforcing social divisions within the company town.

Workers were often paid in part through company-issued tokens or company scrip, which could only be used at company-owned stores, creating a system of economic dependency within the plantation community.

The social organization of Central Aguirre reflected broader patterns of class and colonial hierarchy, with segregated residential zones and unequal access to services.

Labor unrest became a significant feature of the sugar industry in Puerto Rico. In 1934, widespread strikes occurred across the island, including at Aguirre, protesting low wages and working conditions.

=== Modernization and peak production (1940s–early 1960s) ===
Following World War II, Central Aguirre underwent significant technological modernization, including major upgrades to milling equipment between 1949 and 1951.

During this period, the mill reached some of its highest production levels, with daily milling capacity exceeding 6,000 tons of cane. The company also introduced partial mechanization and established research facilities.

Puerto Rico's broader economic transformation under Operation Bootstrap reduced the long-term viability of sugar production.

=== Decline and restructuring (mid-to-late 1960s) ===
The 1960s marked a period of transition and decline for Central Aguirre. Puerto Rico's sugar production peaked in 1952 and declined thereafter due to industrialization policies, rising costs, and global competition.

During the mid-to-late 1960s, the Aguirre Sugar Company underwent corporate restructuring and diversified beyond sugar production. In 1968, it reorganized as the Aguirre Company.

Affiliated mills were closed, sugar output declined sharply, and the company experienced significant financial losses.

=== Government control, redevelopment efforts, and closure (1970–1993) ===
In 1970, the Government of Puerto Rico began acquiring the assets of the Aguirre operation.

Attempts were made during the 1970s to repurpose the land for industrial and commercial development, but these efforts faced infrastructural, environmental, and economic challenges. Industrial development during this period also affected surrounding coastal ecosystems, including mangrove environments near Jobos Bay.

Sugar production continued under public administration at reduced levels until the late 20th century. The sugar mill and associated facilities were permanently closed in 1993.

== Description ==
The historic district includes industrial, residential, and institutional components associated with its function as a company town, including mills, rail infrastructure, administrative buildings, and worker housing.

The industrial sector, developed between 1899 and 1968, includes factory buildings, warehouses, rail yards, and wharf facilities used for exporting sugar via Jobos Bay.

== Preservation and current status ==
The district remains one of the most intact examples of a sugar company town in the Caribbean. In 2020, it was included in the World Monuments Watch, and preservation funding was supported by American Express.

== Gallery ==
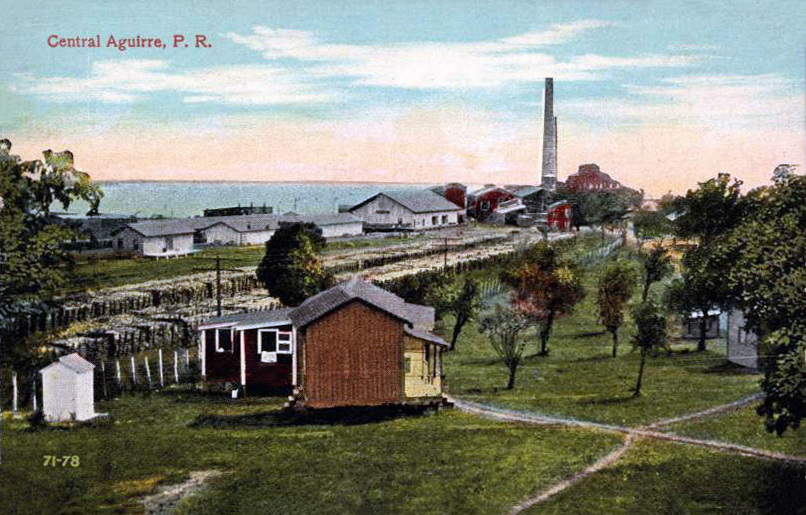
Central Aguirre (circa 1930)

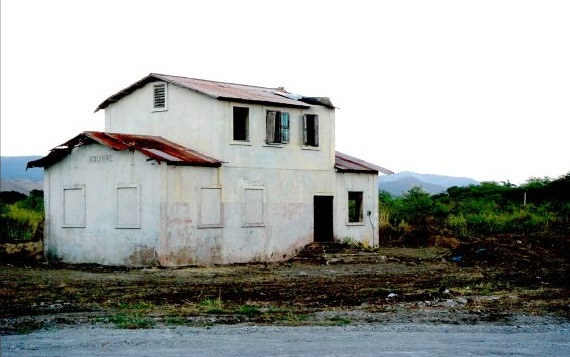
Abandoned buildings (2017)

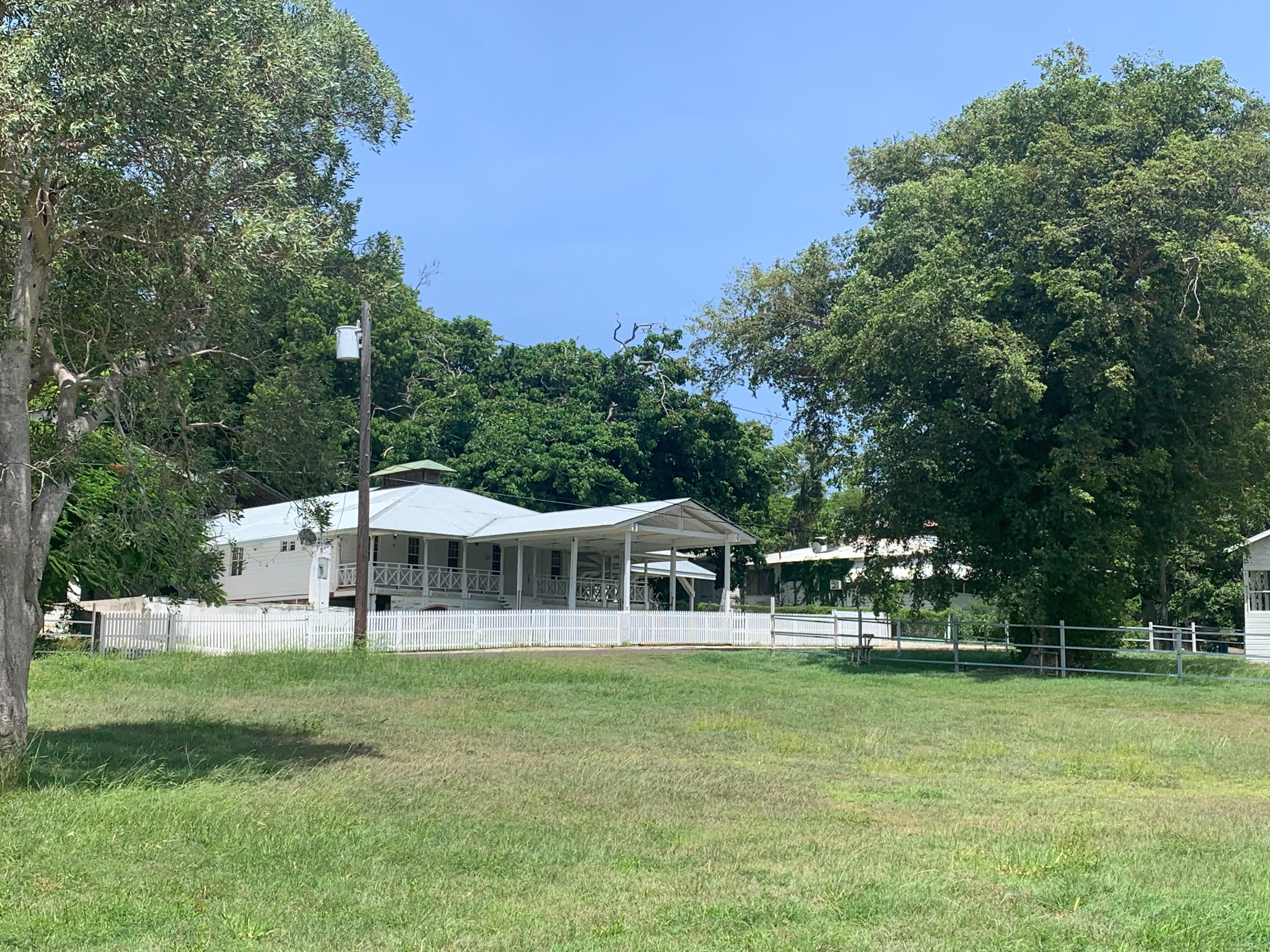
Historic houses (2024)

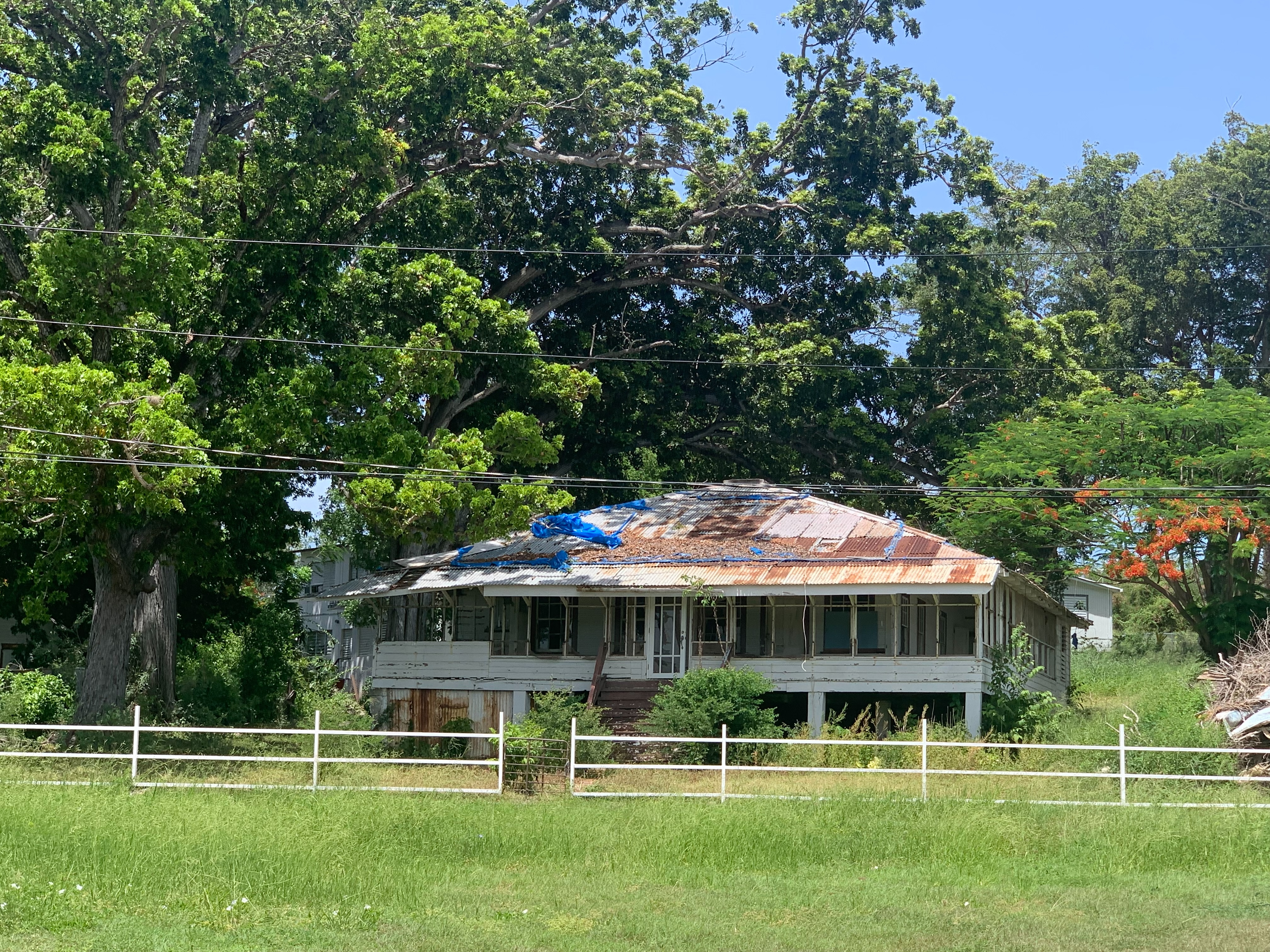
Historic houses (2024)

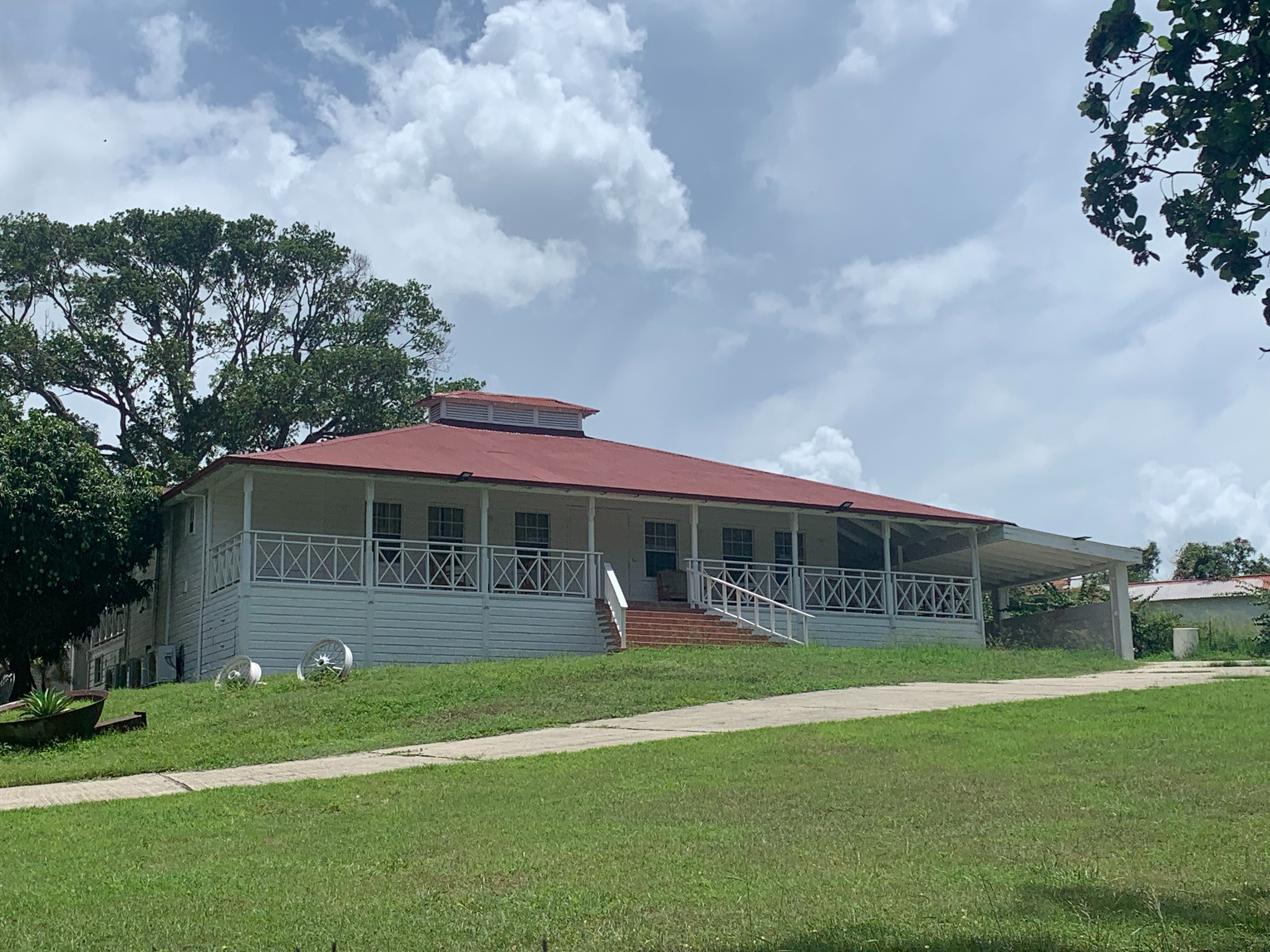
Historic houses (2024)

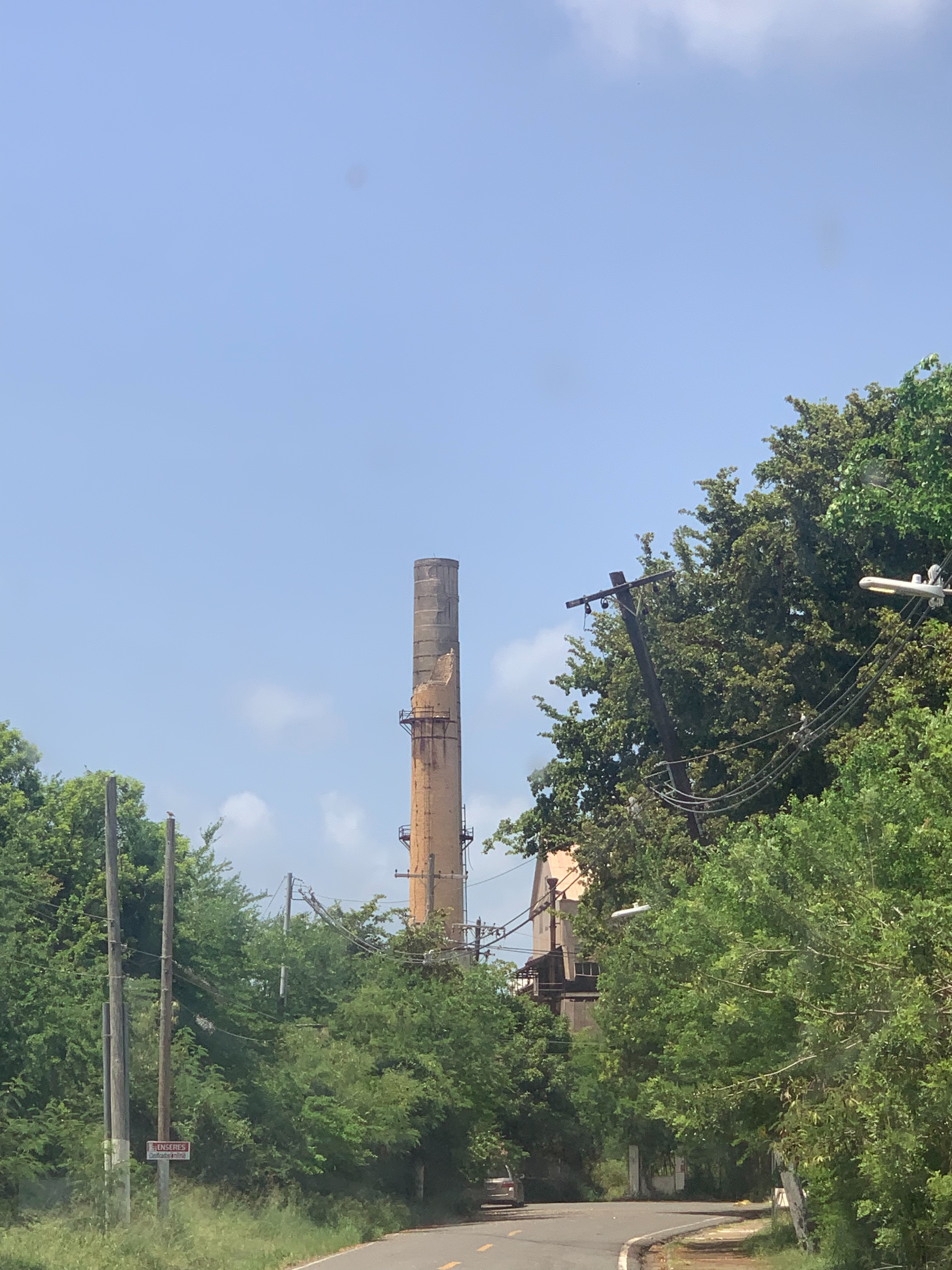
Abandoned sugarcane refinery chimney (2024)

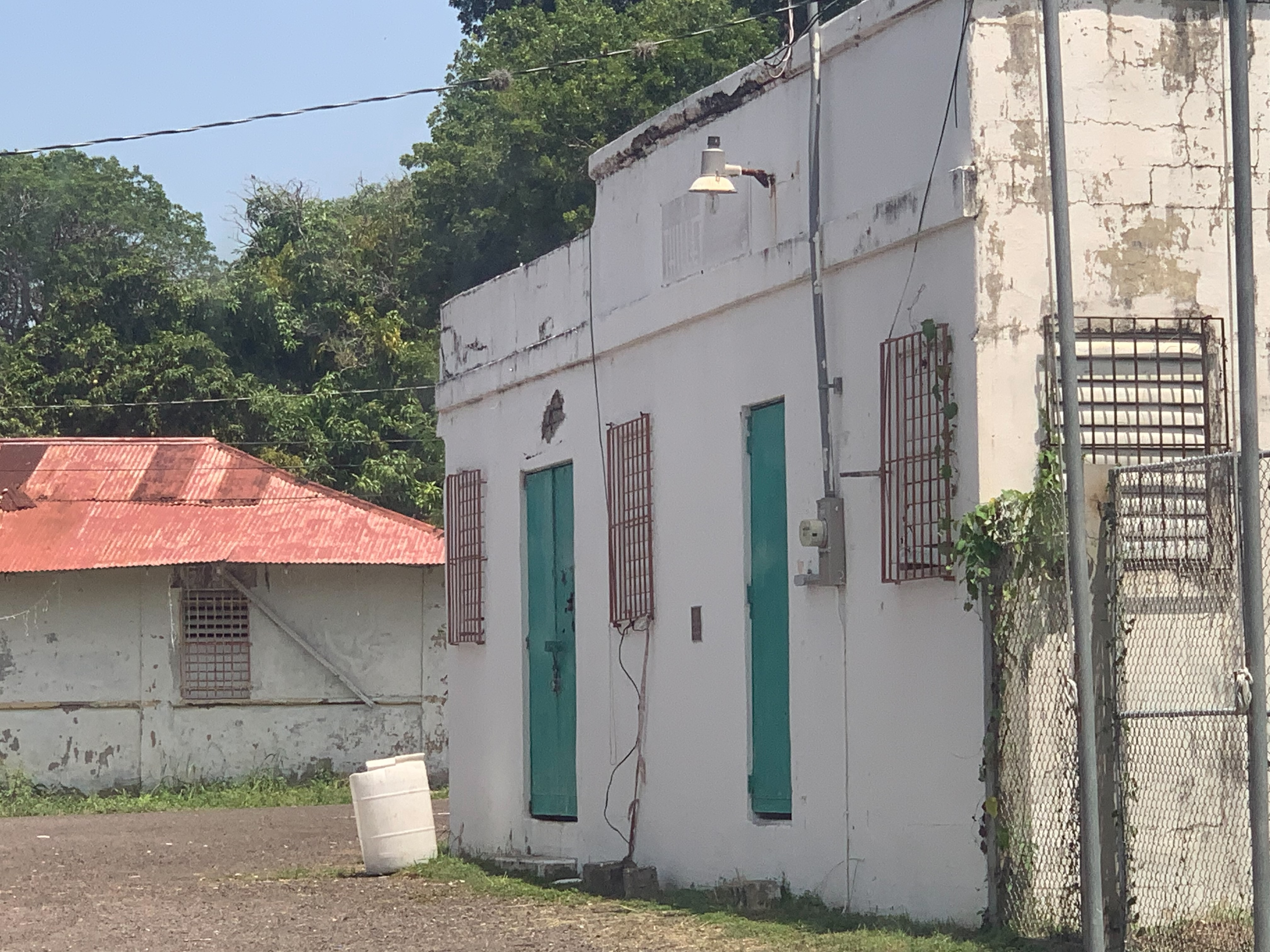
Central Aguirre poblado (2024)

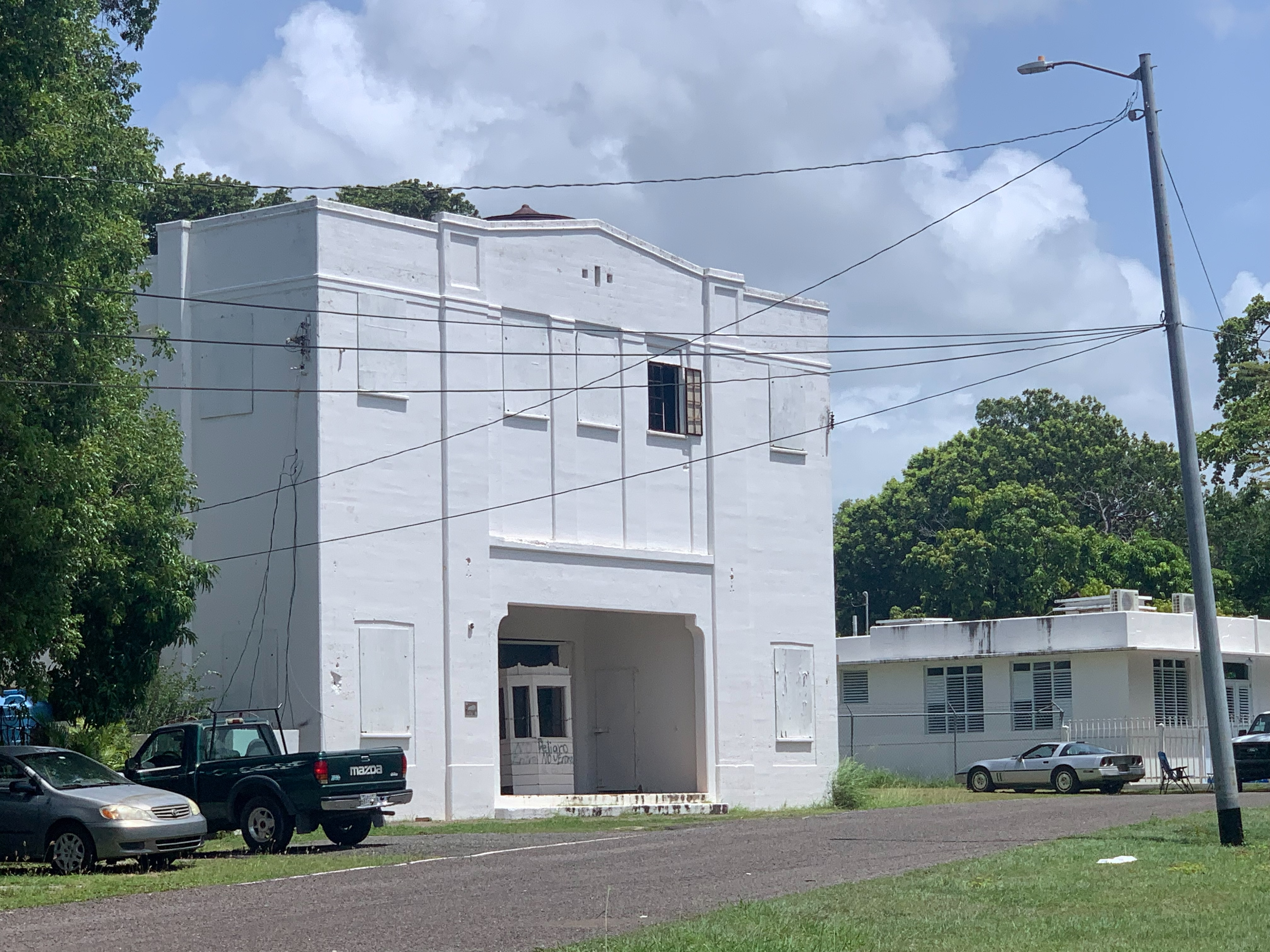
Former Central Aguirre theater (2024)

== See also ==
- Company town
- Operation Bootstrap
