= Guánica State Forest =

State forest in Puerto Rico

Guánica State Forest Spanish: Bosque Estatal de Guánica Bosque Seco de Guánica
- "melón de costa" (Melocactus intortus)

- Location within Puerto Rico
- Interactive map of Guánica State Forest

Geography
- Location: Guánica, Guayanilla, Peñuelas, Ponce, Yauco
- Coordinates: 17°57′56″N 66°52′45″W
- Area: 9,878 acres (39.97 km^{2})

Administration
- Status: Public, Commonwealth
- Established: 1919
- Authority: Puerto Rico Department of Natural and Environmental Resources (DRNA)
- Website: www.drna.gobierno.pr

Ecology
- WWF Classification: Puerto Rican dry forests

The Guánica State Forest (Spanish: Bosque Estatal de Guánica), popularly known as the Guánica Dry Forest (Spanish: Bosque seco de Guánica) is a subtropical dry forest located in southwest Puerto Rico. The area was designated as a forest reserve in 1919 and a United Nations Biosphere Reserve in 1981. It is considered the best preserved subtropical dry forest and the best example of dry forest in the Caribbean.

With approximately 10,000 acres, it is the largest of the 20 state forests of Puerto Rico, and it extends over 5 municipalities: Guánica, Guayanilla, Peñuelas, Ponce, and Yauco (although the forest units located in the municipalities of Peñuelas and Ponce only consist of keys and small islands).

== History ==
The dry forest area of southwestern Puerto Rico protected under the jurisdiction of the Guánica Dry Forest was first established in 1919 as a forest reserve. The United Nations recognized the ecological value of the forest in 1981 when it was designated a Biosphere Reserve, the second in Puerto Rico after El Yunque National Forest (then called the Caribbean National Forest). The forest was given further protections as a nature reserve on October 16, 1985, by the Puerto Rico Planning Board (Spanish: Junta De Planificación), and all provisions from Law No. 133 from 1975 were subsequently applied to the nature reserve. It was further designated an Important Bird Area by BirdLife International in 2007.

== Geography ==
Located in the dry orographic rain shadow of the Cordillera Central, Puerto Rico's driest area, temperatures in the forest are, on average, around 80 °F (27 °C) in shaded areas and 100 °F (38 °C) in exposed areas. The average temperature is 25.3 °C (77.5 °F) and the average annual rainfall is 791 millimetres (31.1 in).

== Geology ==
The dry forest is located on the Southern karst region of Puerto Rico. The soils in the state forest include limestone, fine and soft lime soil which include areas of sand and clay where deciduous plants grow, and sand and clay soils where evergreen plants thrive.

== Ecology ==
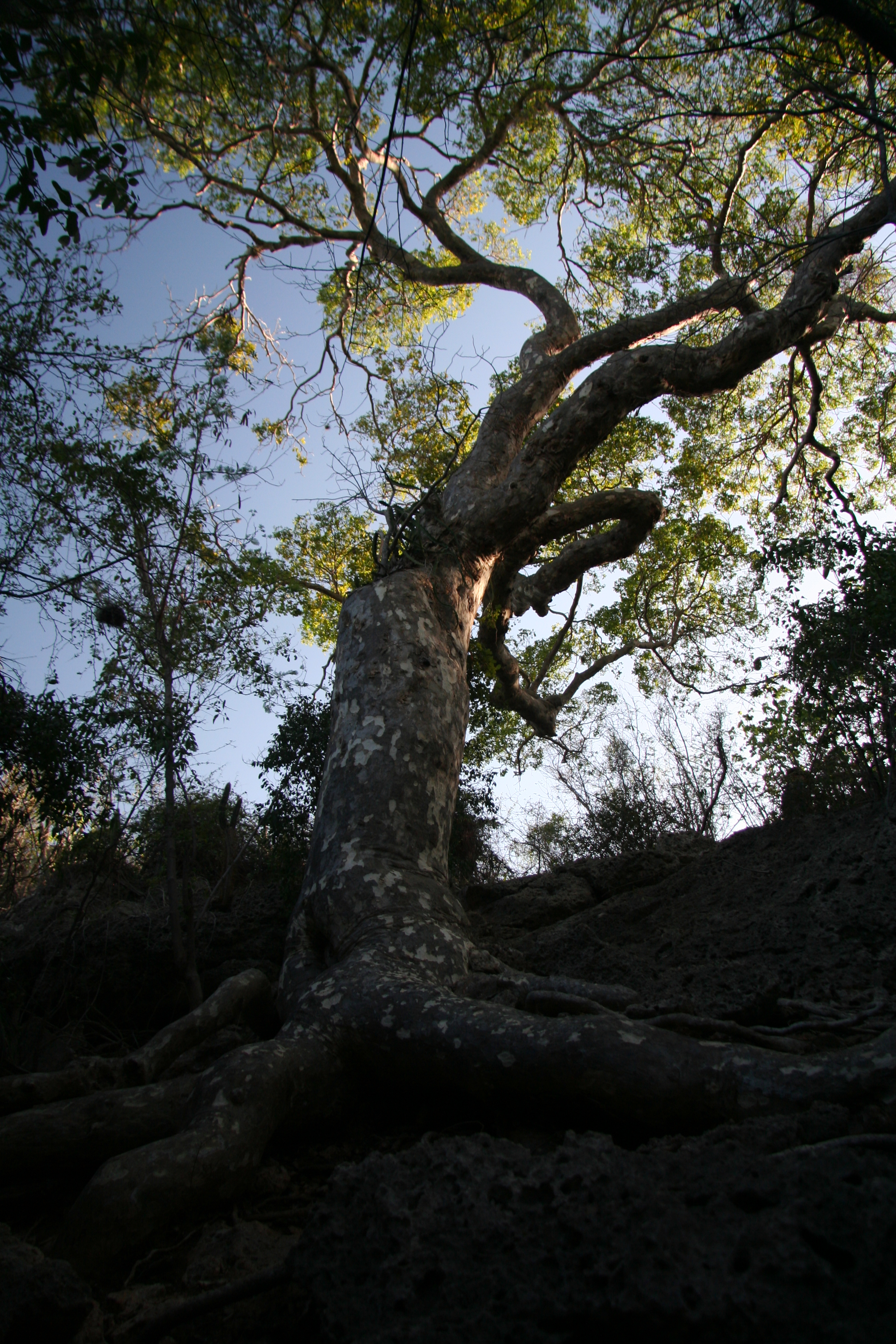
The famous Guayacán Centenario.

The Guánica State Forest is of great natural complexity and scientific importance as it serves as a critical habitat to numerous species of animals and plants that are unique to the region. Its ecosystems include sandy beaches, rocky shores, mangrove forests, seagrass prairies, coral reefs, limestone caverns, saltwater lagoons, salt flats and different types of dry forests (both deciduous and evergreen).

The last remaining natural population of Puerto Rican crested toads (Peltophryne lemur) can be found in the intermittent freshwater pools which are created by seasonal rains. This species proliferates in the natural conditions created by the karstic geology of the forest, and current efforts by the Association of Zoos and Aquariums (AZA) include breeding programs and projects to release individuals of this species in similar ecosystems in Coamo and in the Northern karst of Puerto Rico.

=== Fauna ===
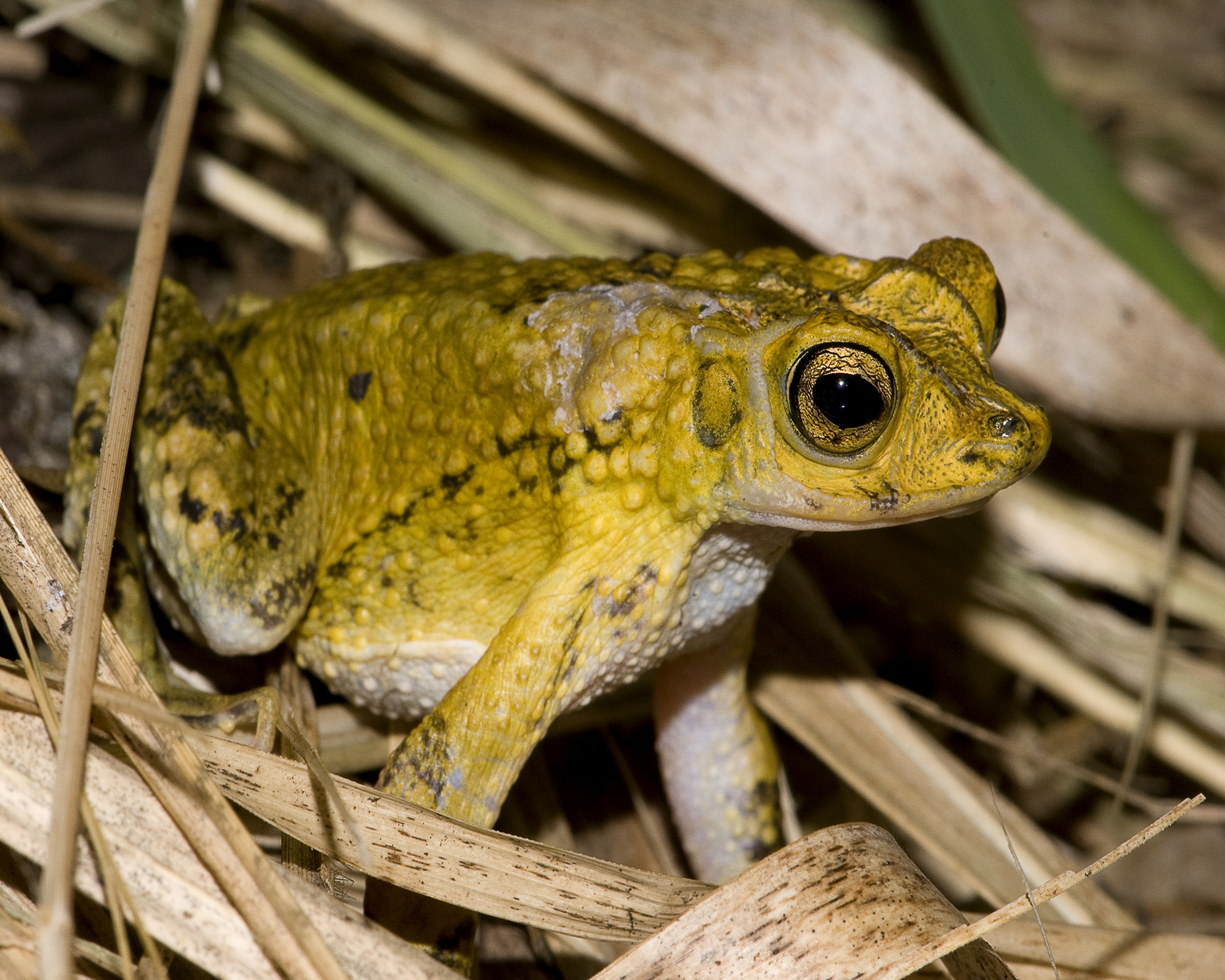
Puerto Rican crested toad

Approximately half of Puerto Rico's birds and nine of sixteen the endemic bird species occur in the Guánica State Forest. In addition to the Puerto Rican crested toad, other protected animal species in the forest include the Puerto Rican vireo (Vireo latimeri), the Puerto Rican nightjar (Antrostomus noctitherus), the red land crab (Gecarcinus ruricola), and the Mona basket shrimp (Typhlatya monae). The dry forest is also one of the few habitats where the Cook's pallid anole (Anolis cooki) can be found. The coral reefs and maritime areas of the forest reserve are also home to numerous coral, animal and plant species, such as the West Indian manatee which feeds on seaweeds, found in underwater prairies in the reserve.

=== Flora ===
The vegetation in the forest is divided into three main groups: upland deciduous forest (which occupies 23.5 square kilometres or 9.1 square miles), semi-evergreen forest (7.2 square kilometres or 2.8 square miles), and scrub forest (5.8 square kilometres or 2.2 square miles). Similar to other insular dry forests species diversity is low; between 30 and 50 tree species are found per hectare. More than 700 plant species, of which 48 are endangered and 16 are endemic to the forest, occur within the forest. Some of the endangered plant species in the forest include the sebucan cactus (Leptocereus quadricostatus), the palo de rosa (Ottoschulzia rhodoxylon), the violeta tree (Polygala cowellii), and the critically endangered bariaco (Trichilia triacantha). One of the most famous plant inhabitants of the forest is an old-growth guaiacwood tree or guayacán (Guaiacum officinale) often called the Guayacán Centenario ("the centenary guaiacwood") which could be as old as 1,000 years-old.

== Recreation ==
The dry forest is open to visitors and some of its beaches are popular with tourists and locals alike. Fishing and biking are allowed in special designated areas, while scuba diving is also popular in the coral reefs and in the beaches. There are 12 hiking trails with varying difficulties open to visitors and the reserve is also popular for birdwatching.

== Gallery ==
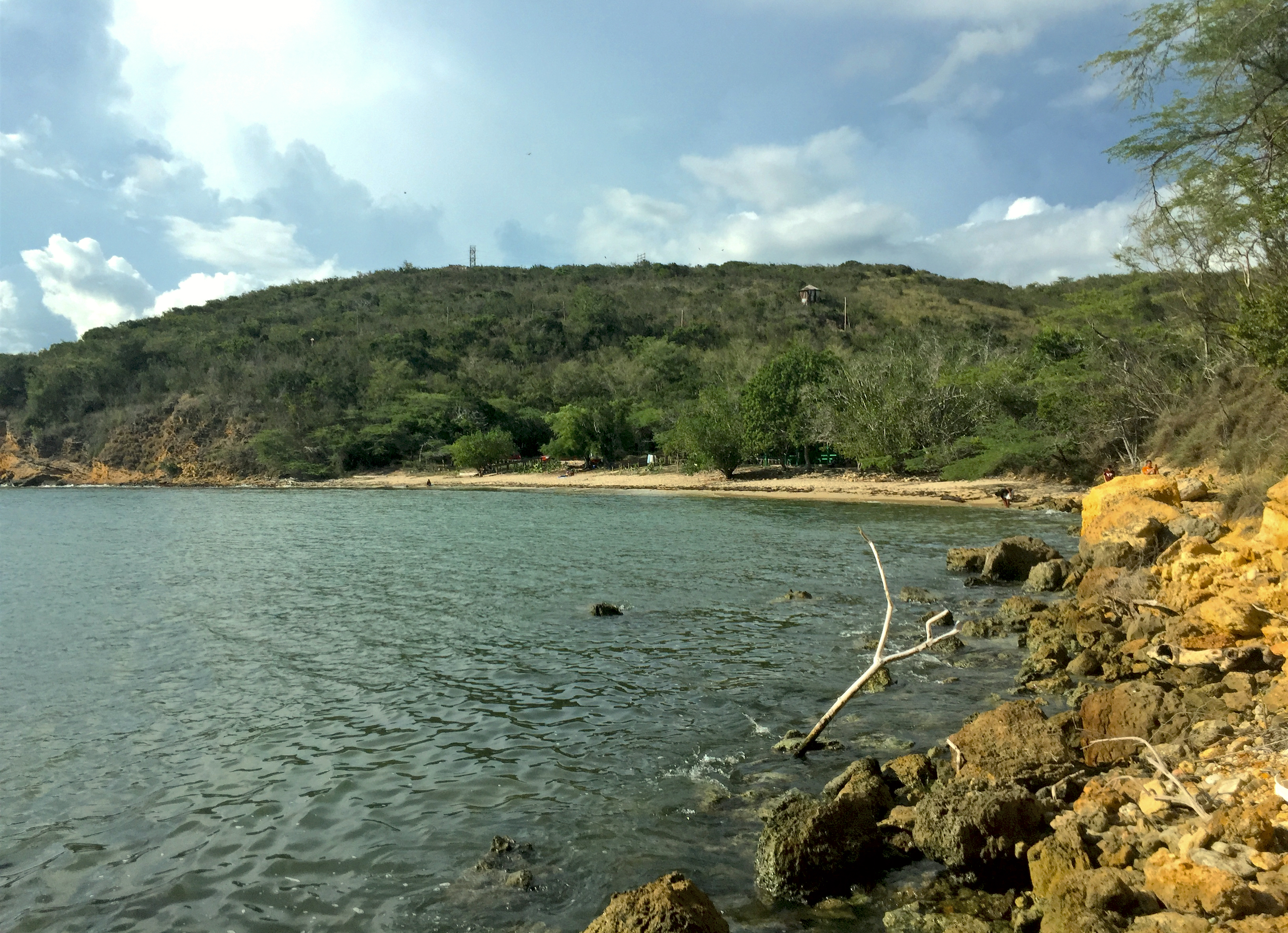
Jaboncillo Beach

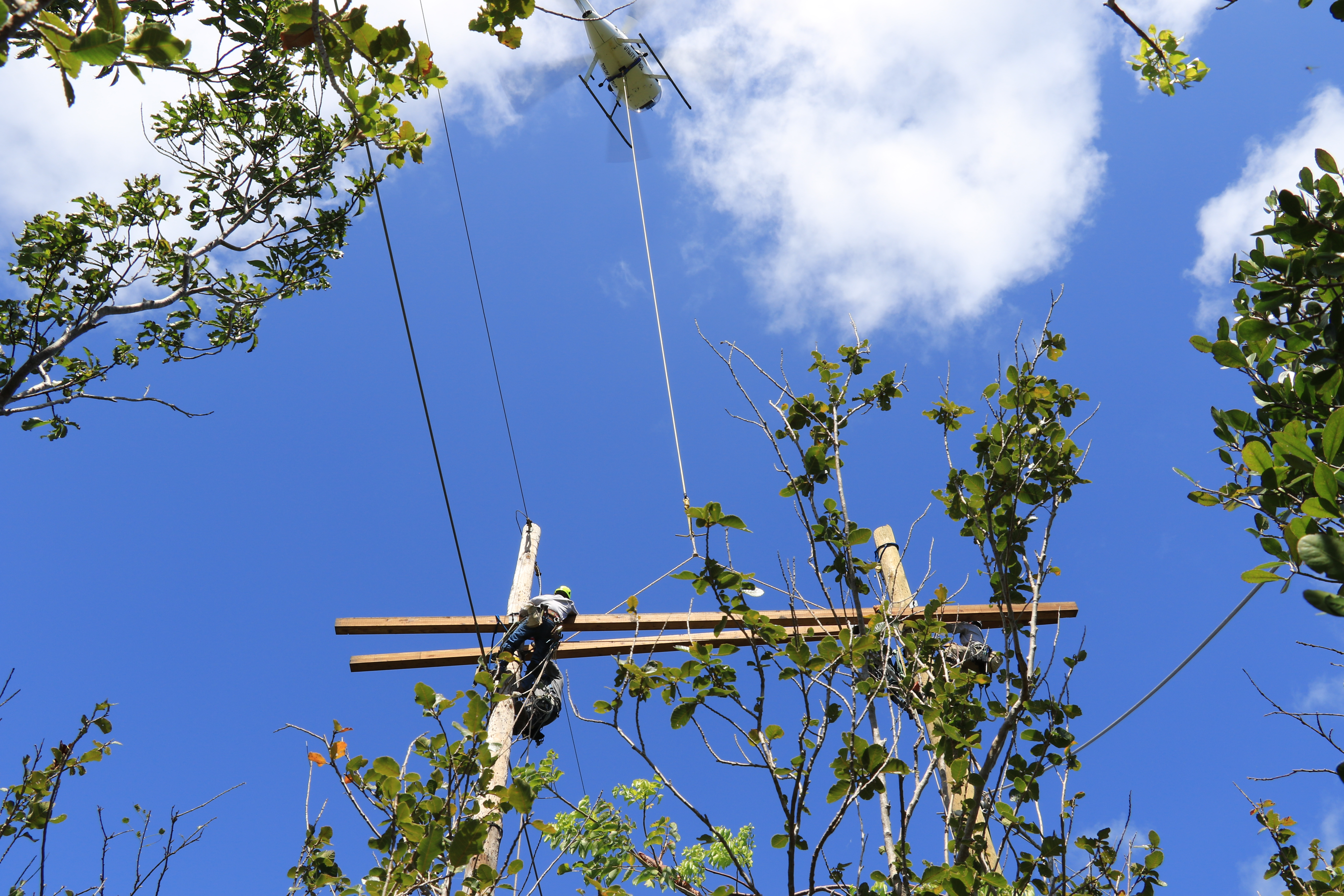
Critical electrical grid infrastructure in Guánica State Forest.

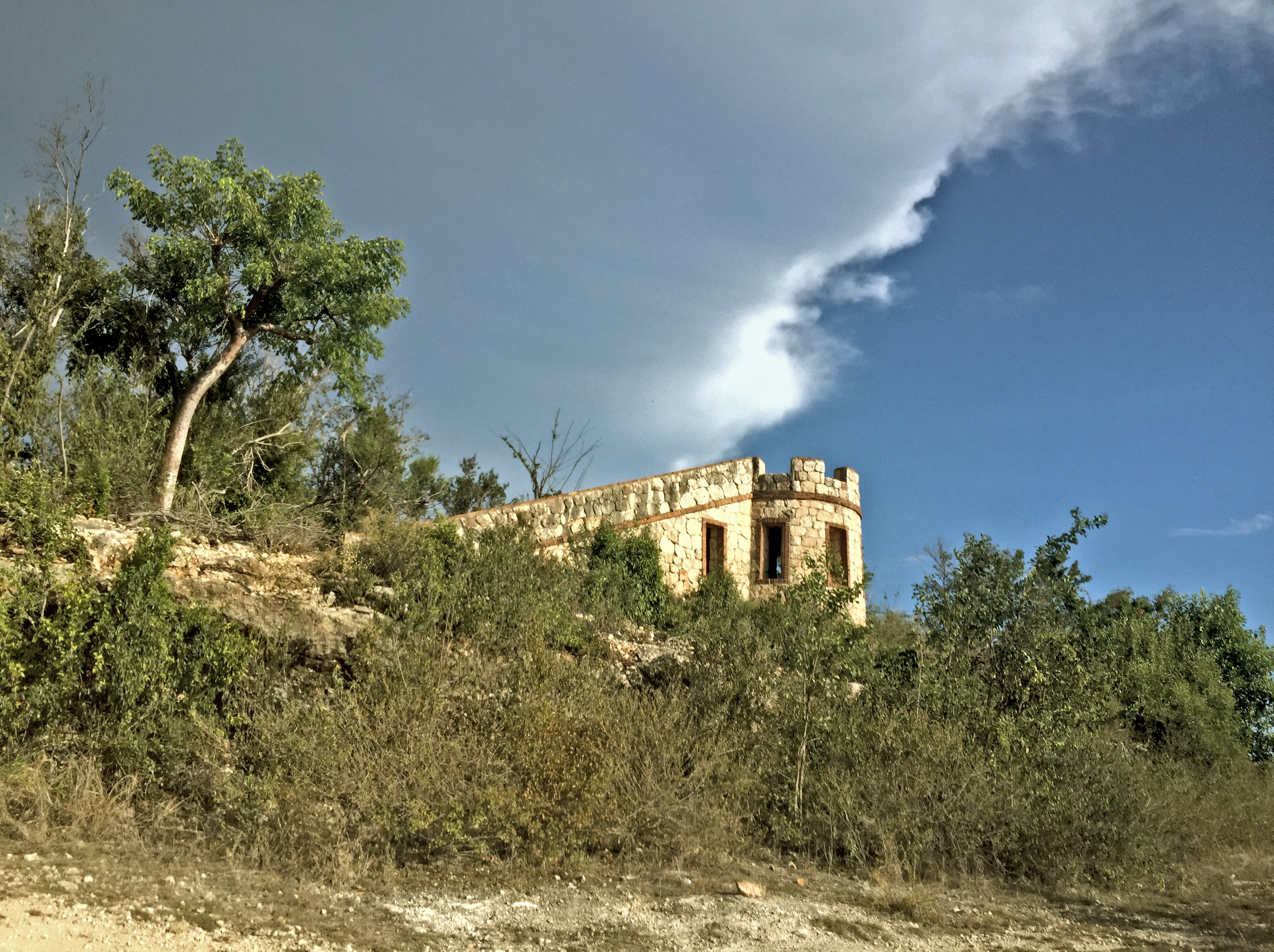
Fuerte Caprón ruins.

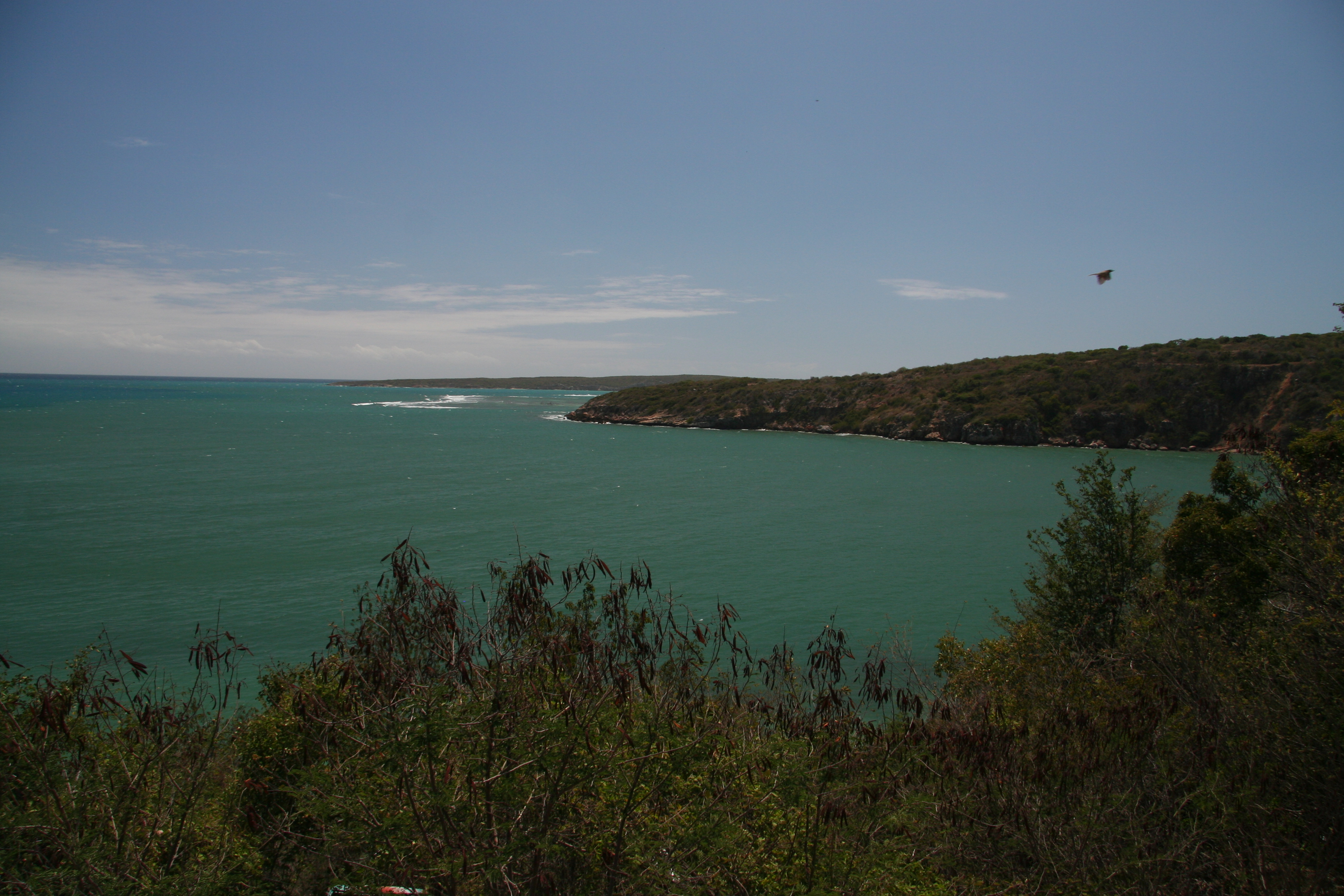
View from Guánica State Forest.

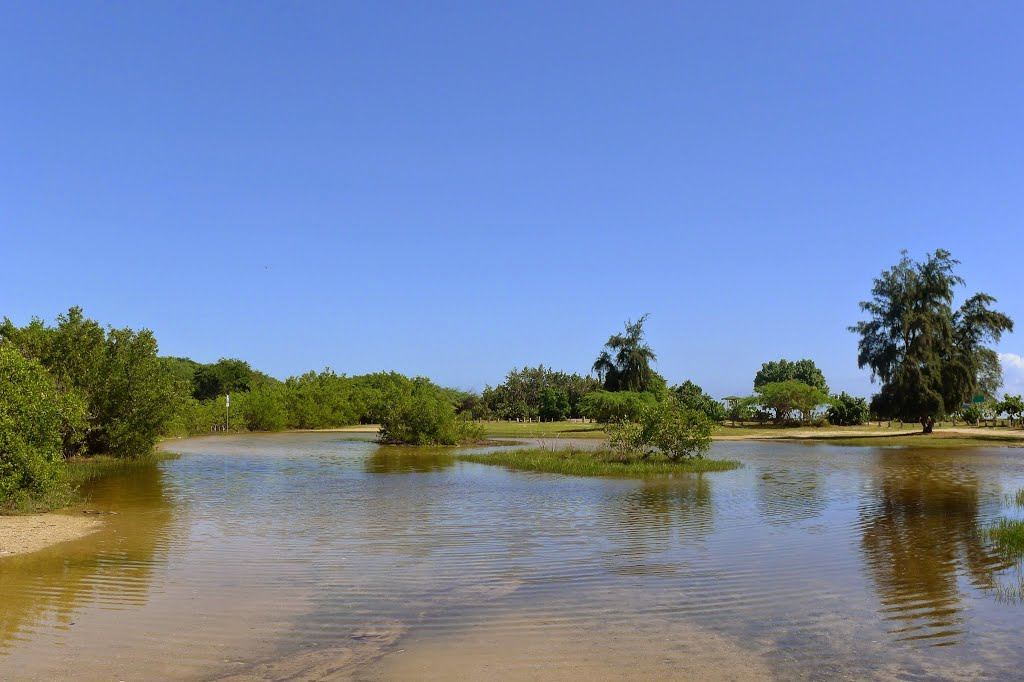
Salt flats of the dry forest in Boca, Guayanilla.

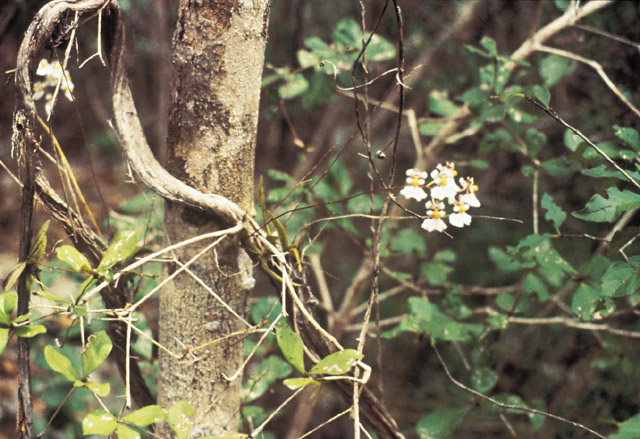
Tolumnia sp. in the forest.

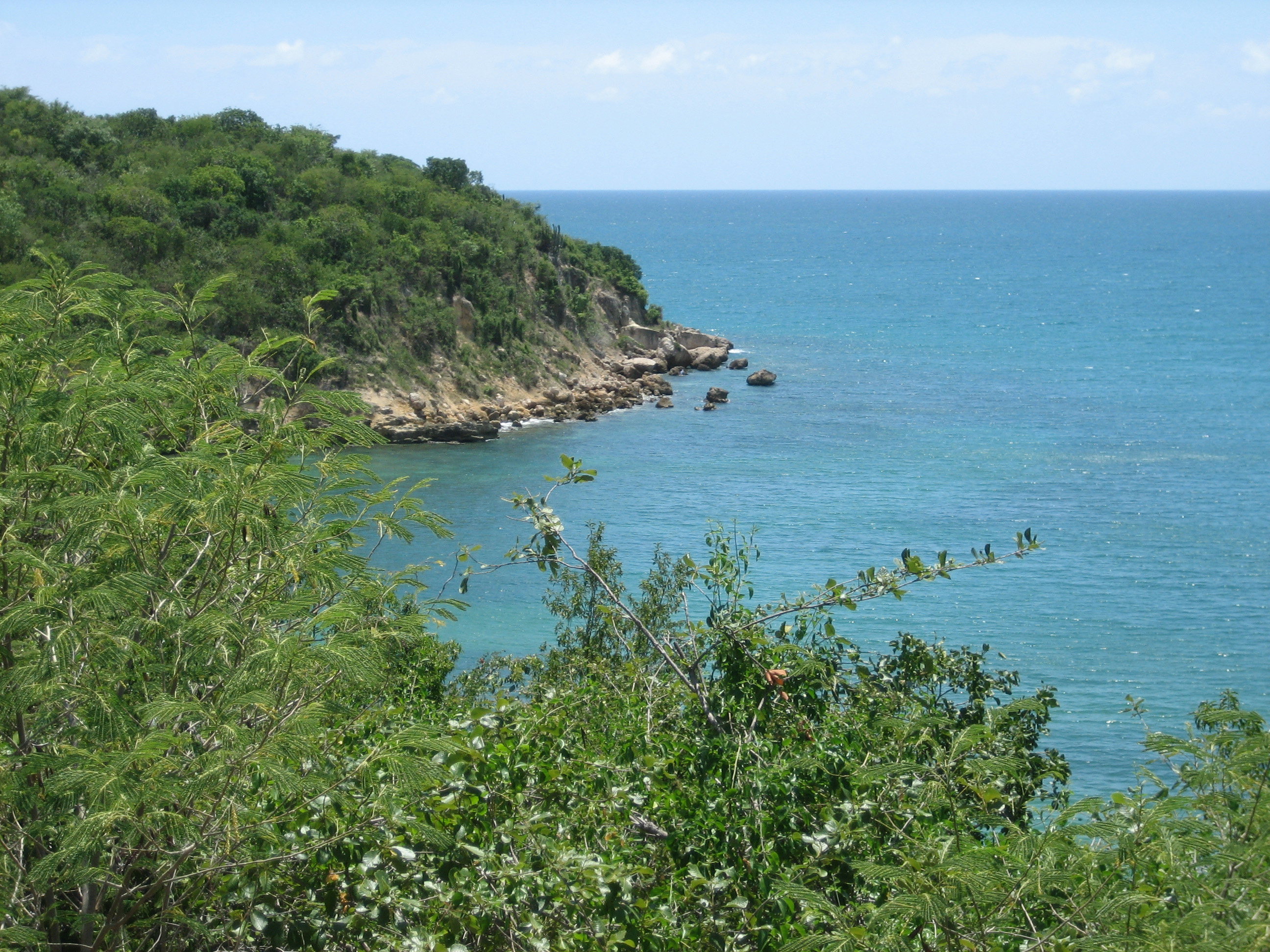
Limestone cliffs in the forest.

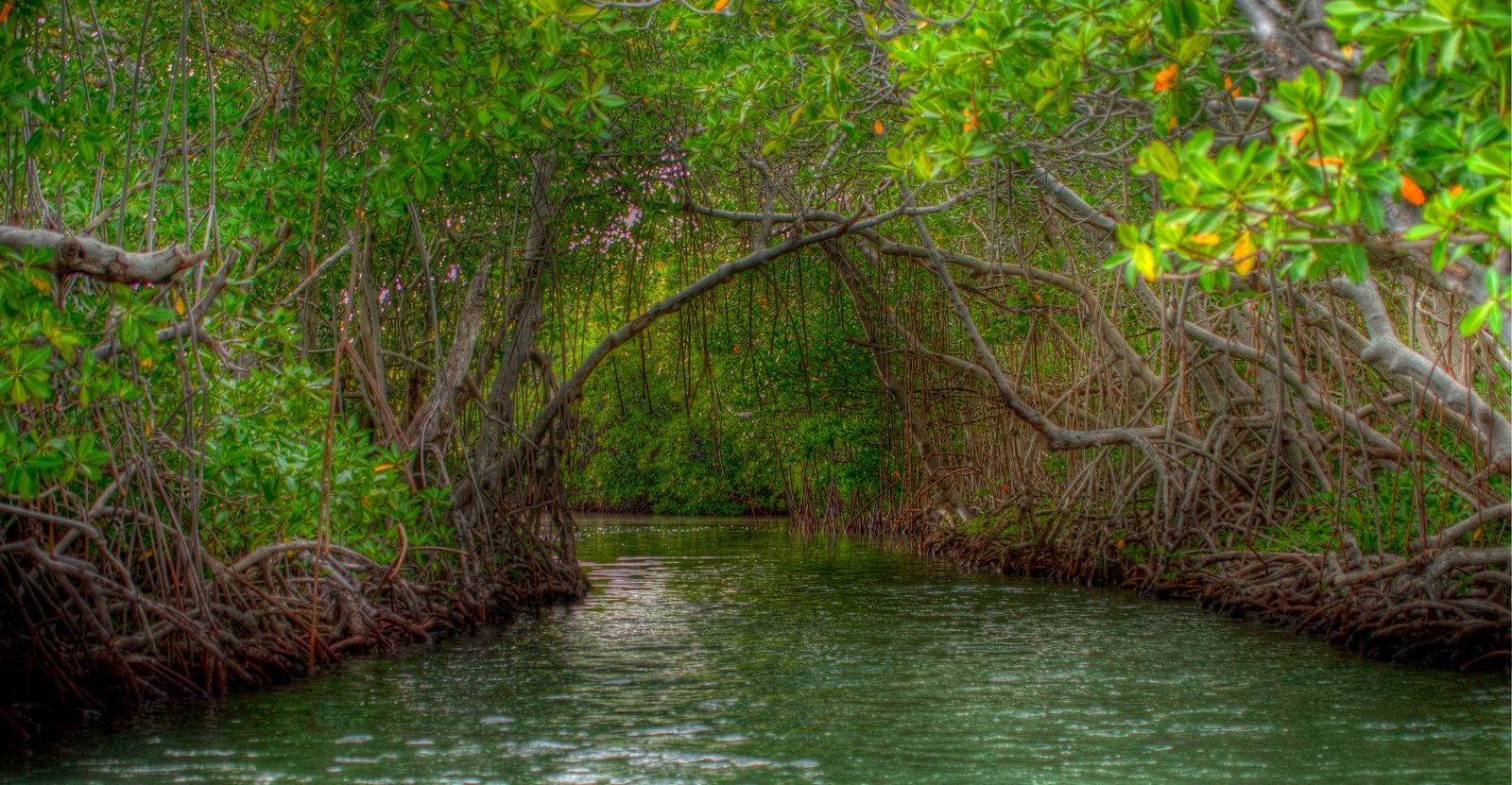
Mangrove forest in Guánica.

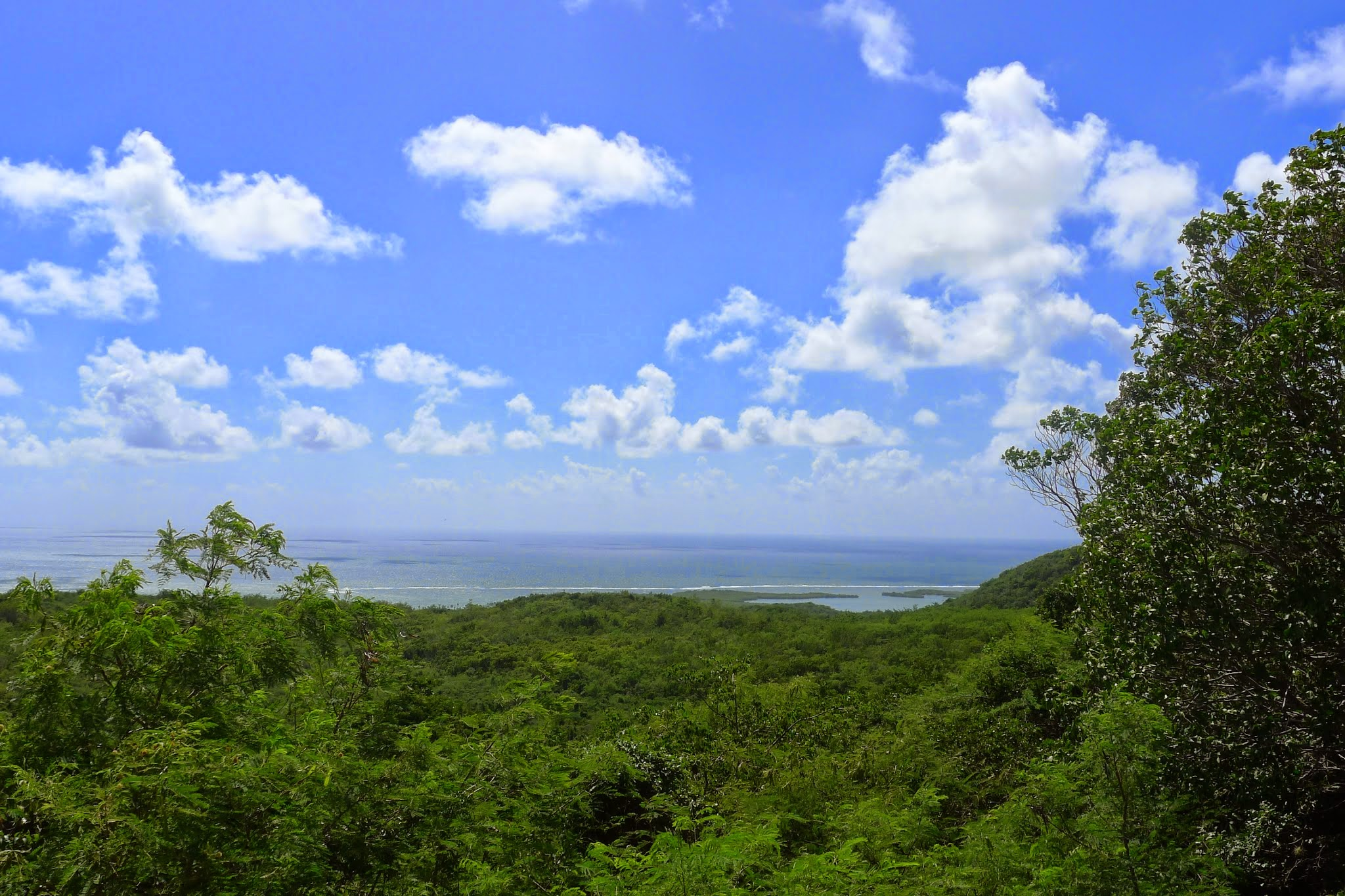
View of the forest from Carenero, Guánica.

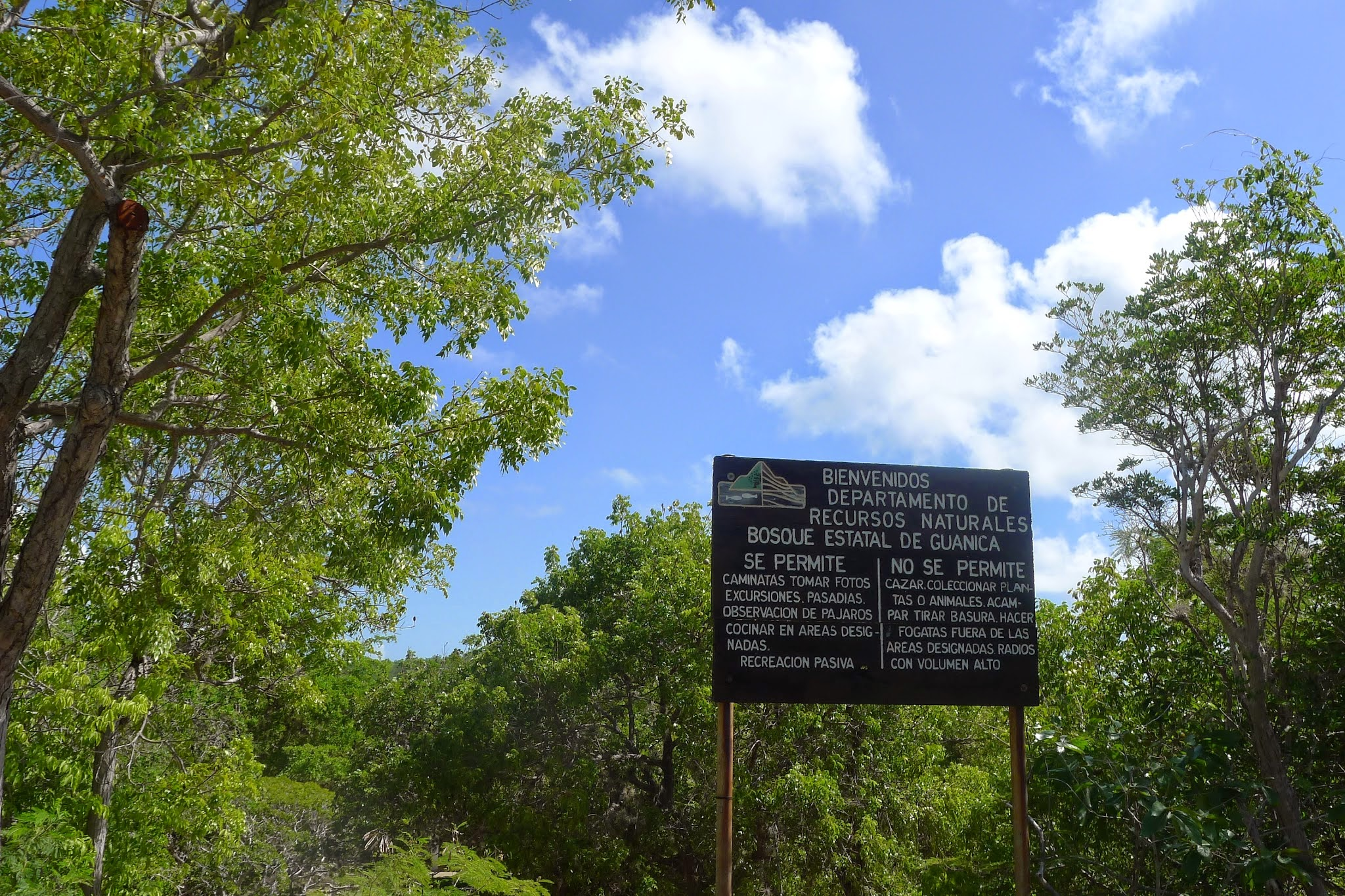
State forest sign by the DRNA.

Melocactus intortus

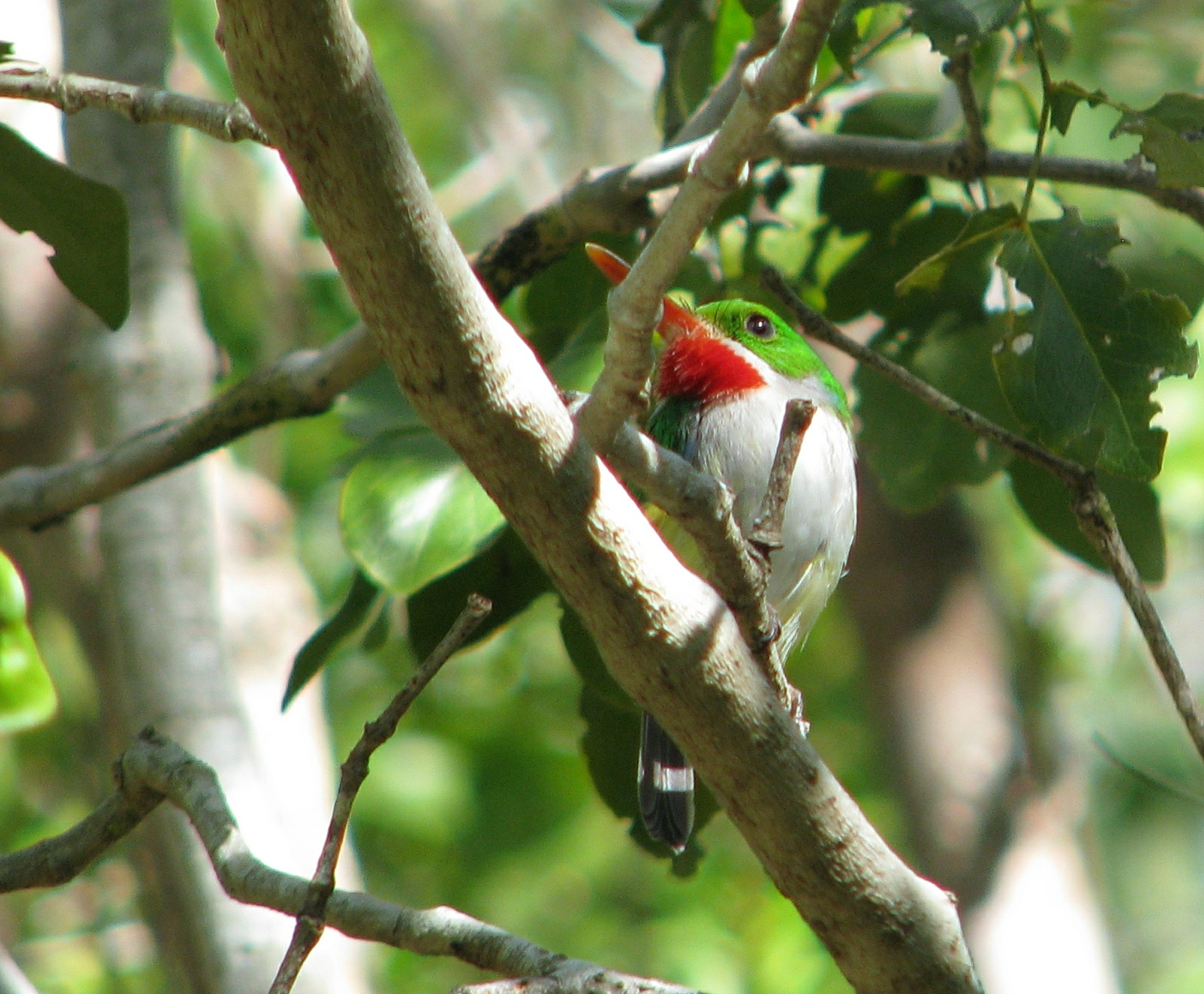
Puerto Rican tody

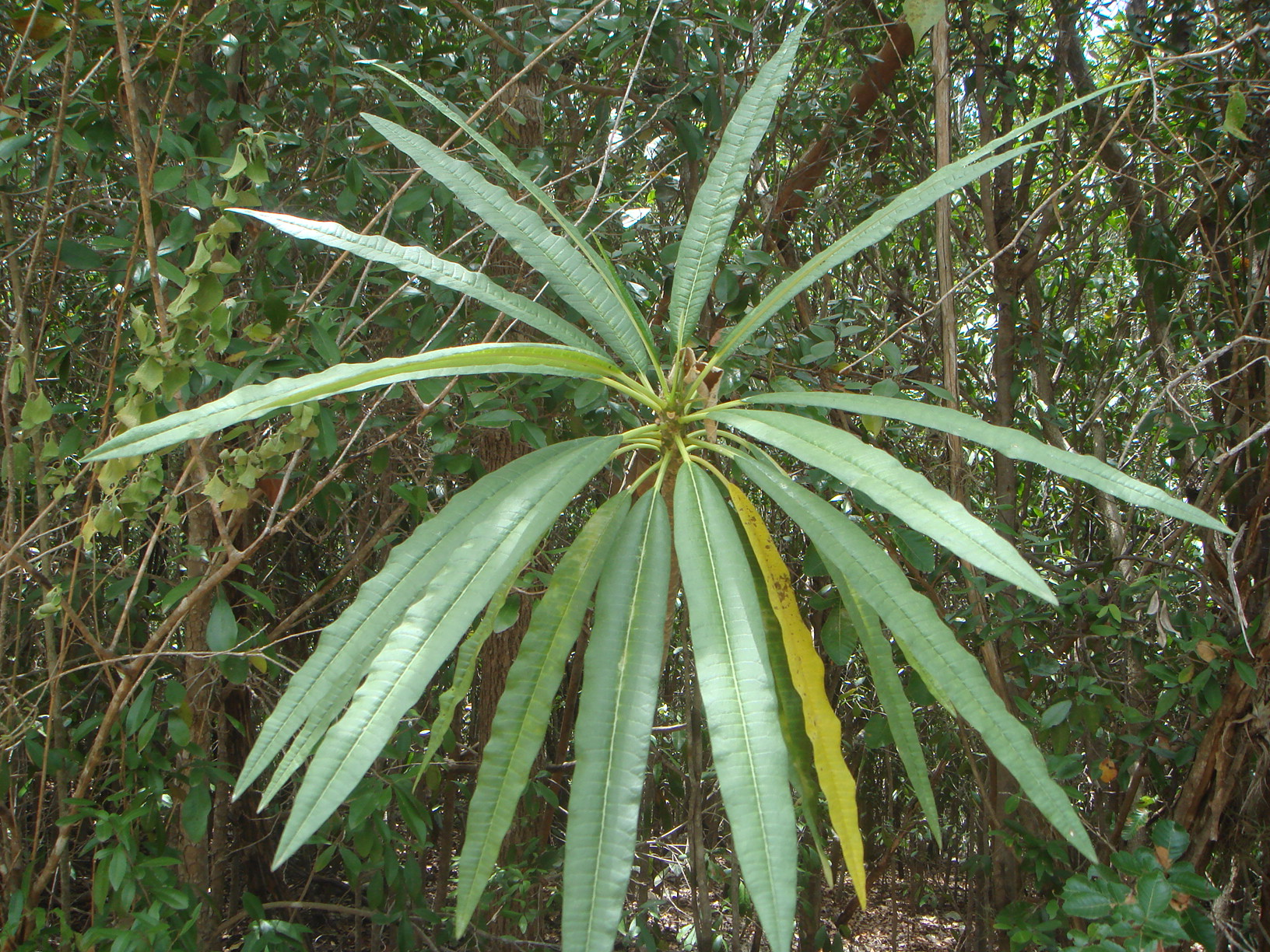
Plumeria alba

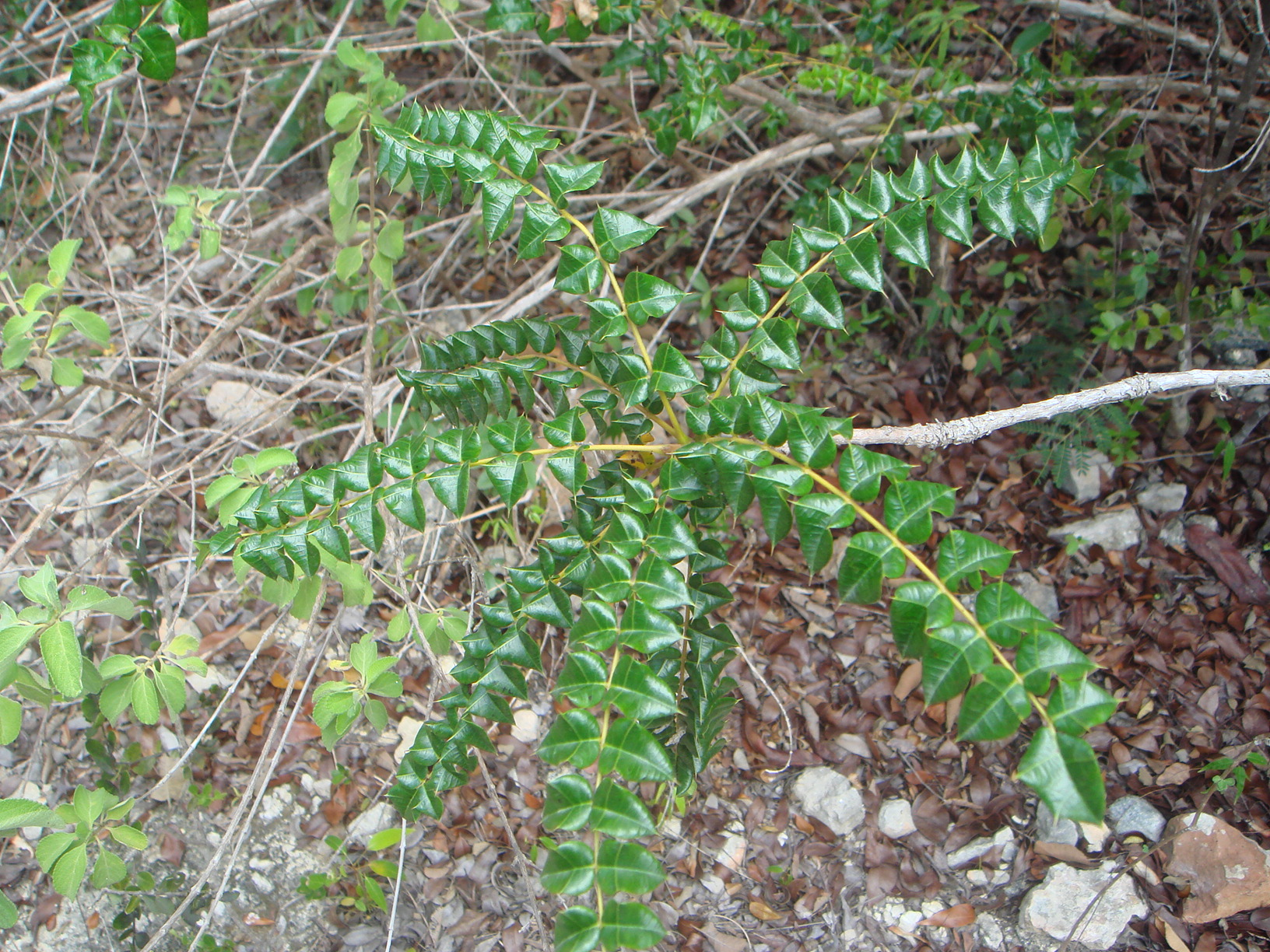
Comocladia dodonaea

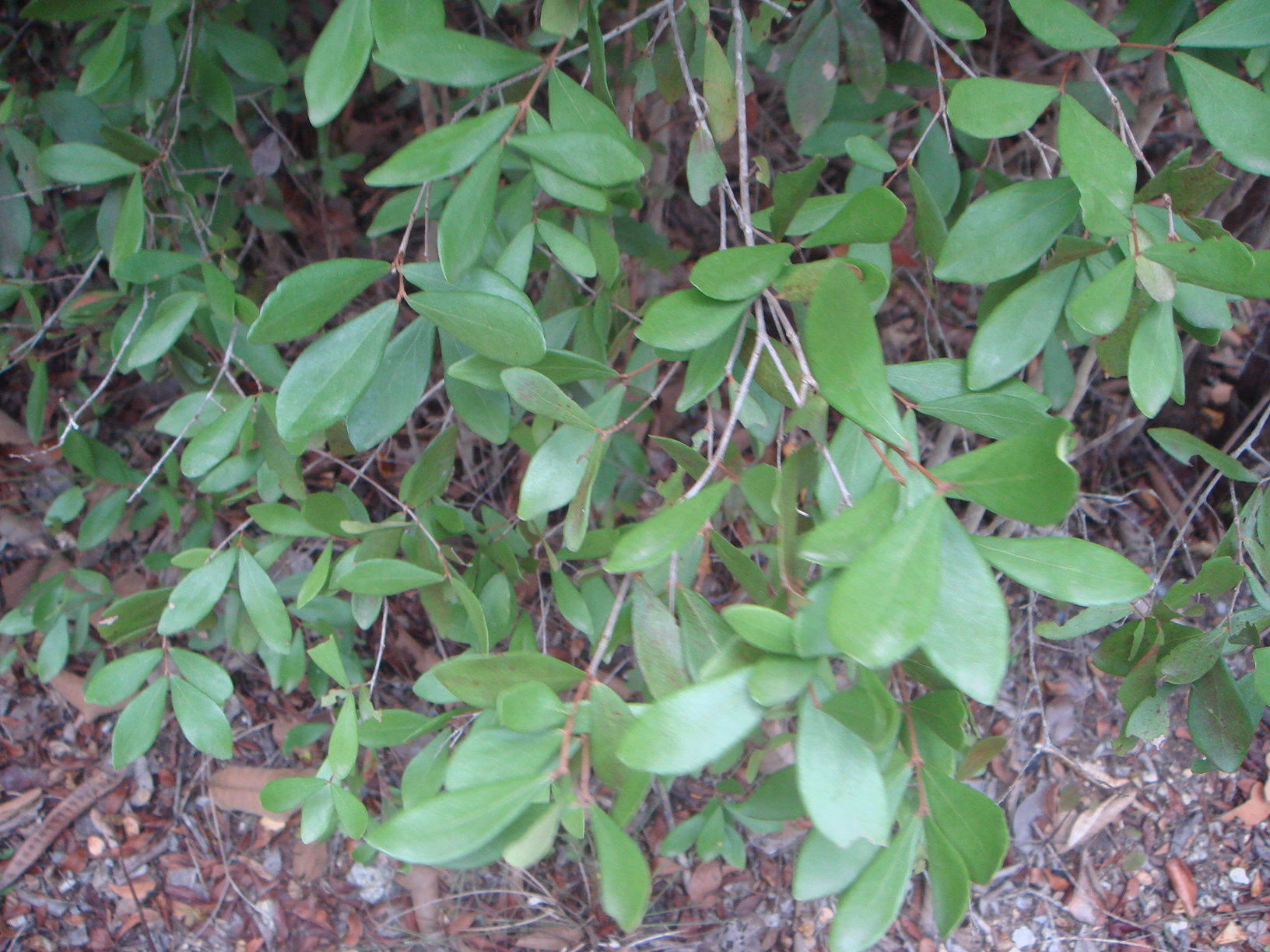
Eugenia foetida

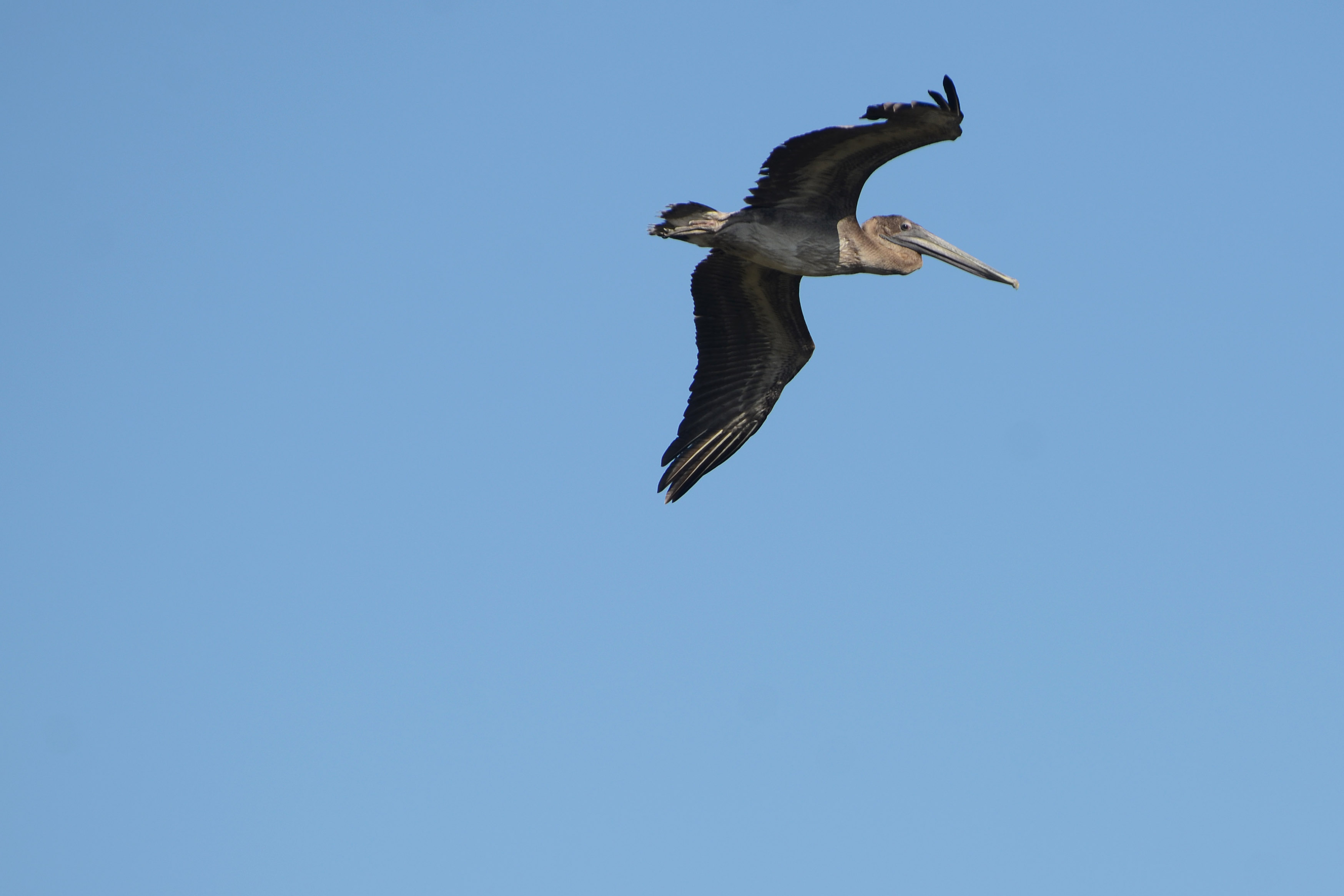
Brown pelican

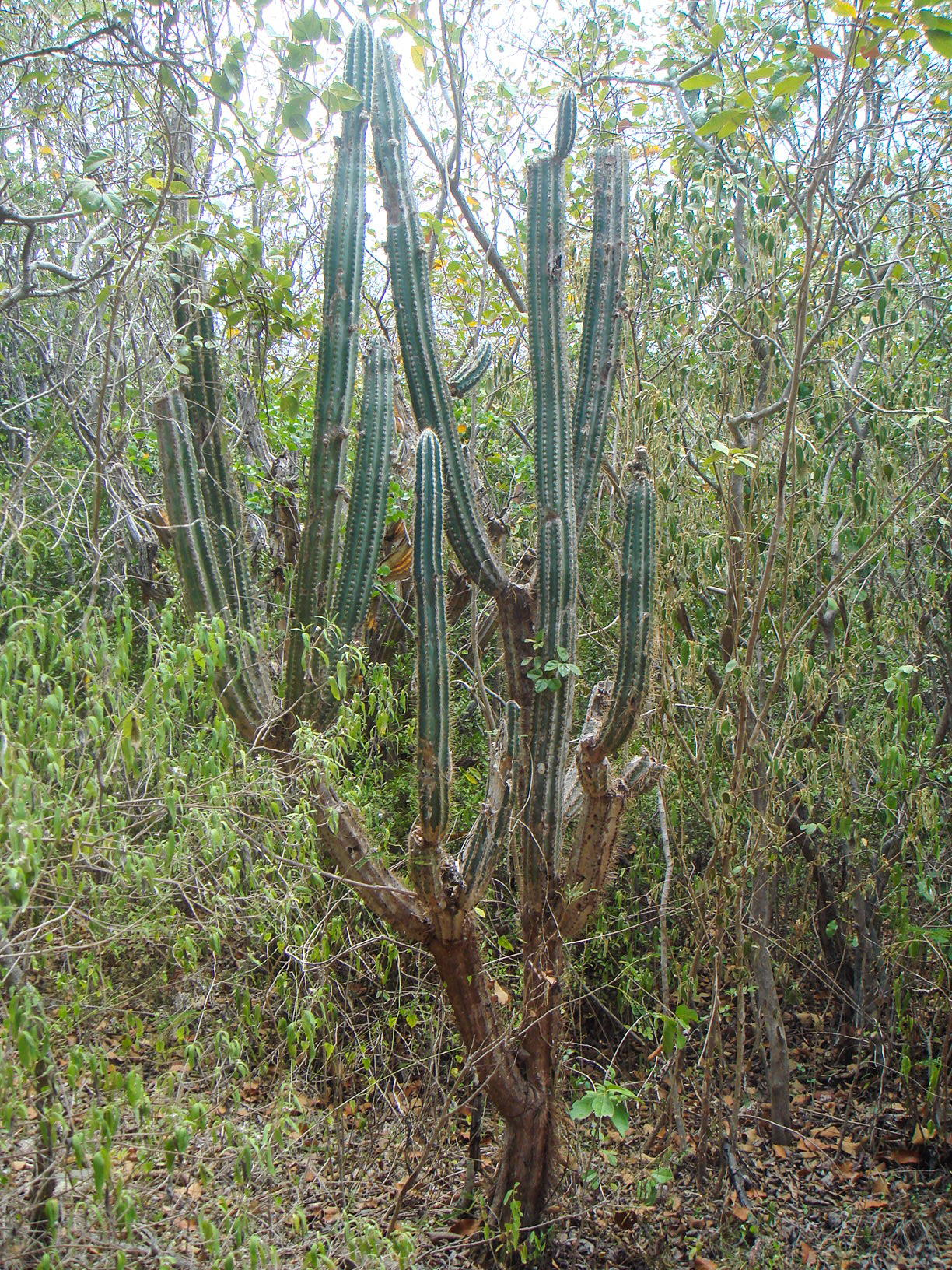
Pilosocereus royenii (Pilosocereus armatus)

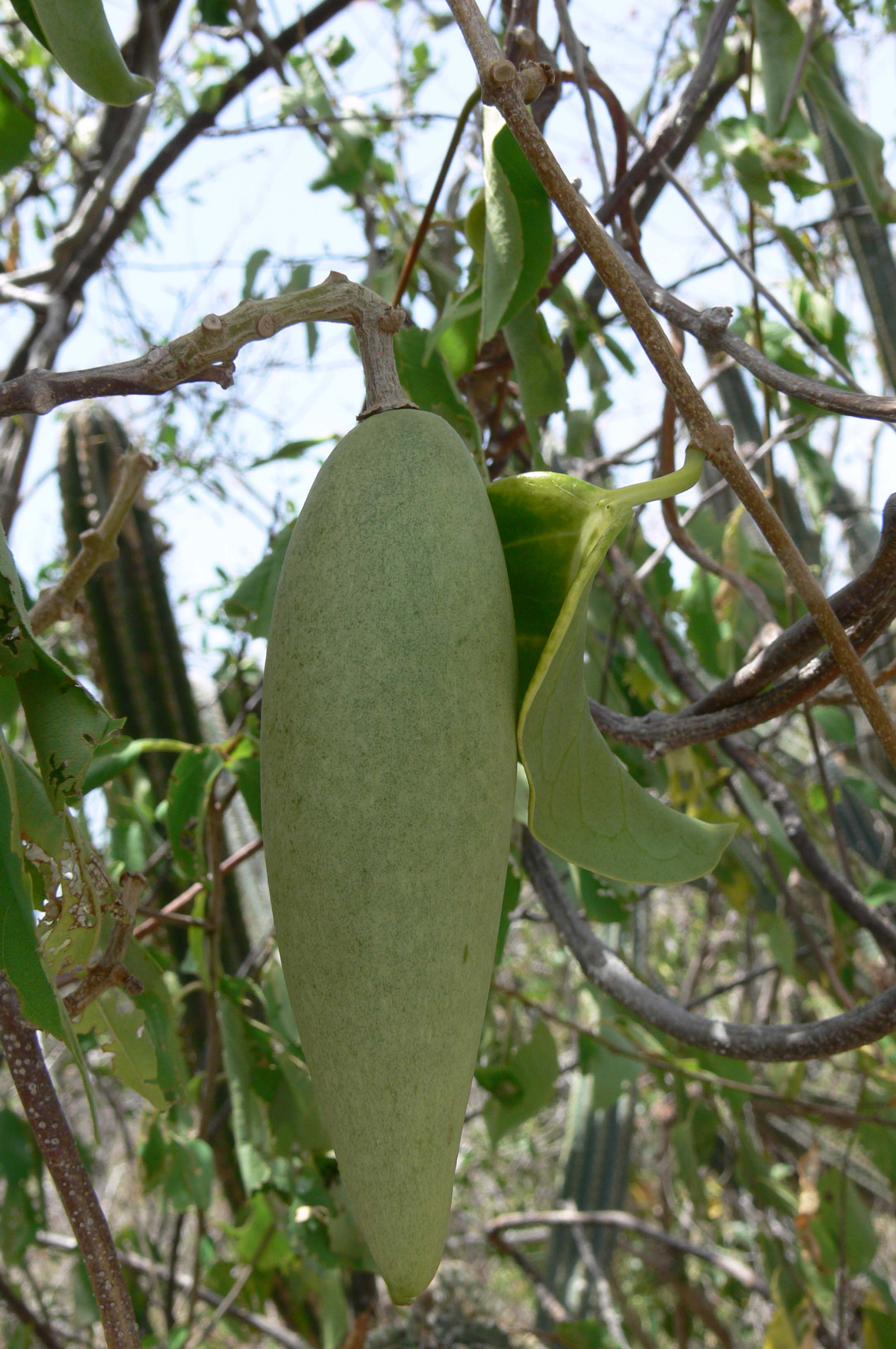
Ruehssia woodburyana

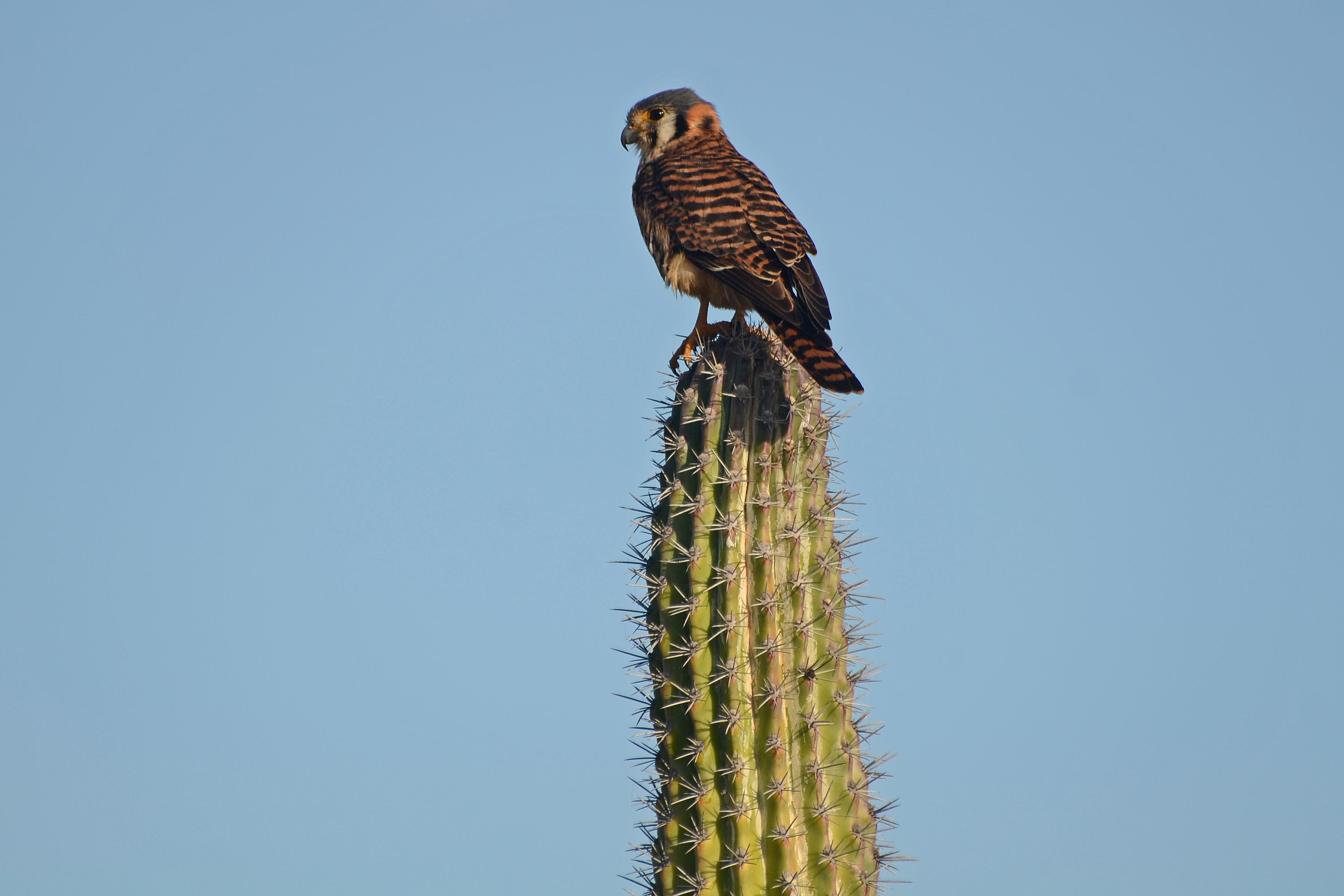
American kestrel on cactus.

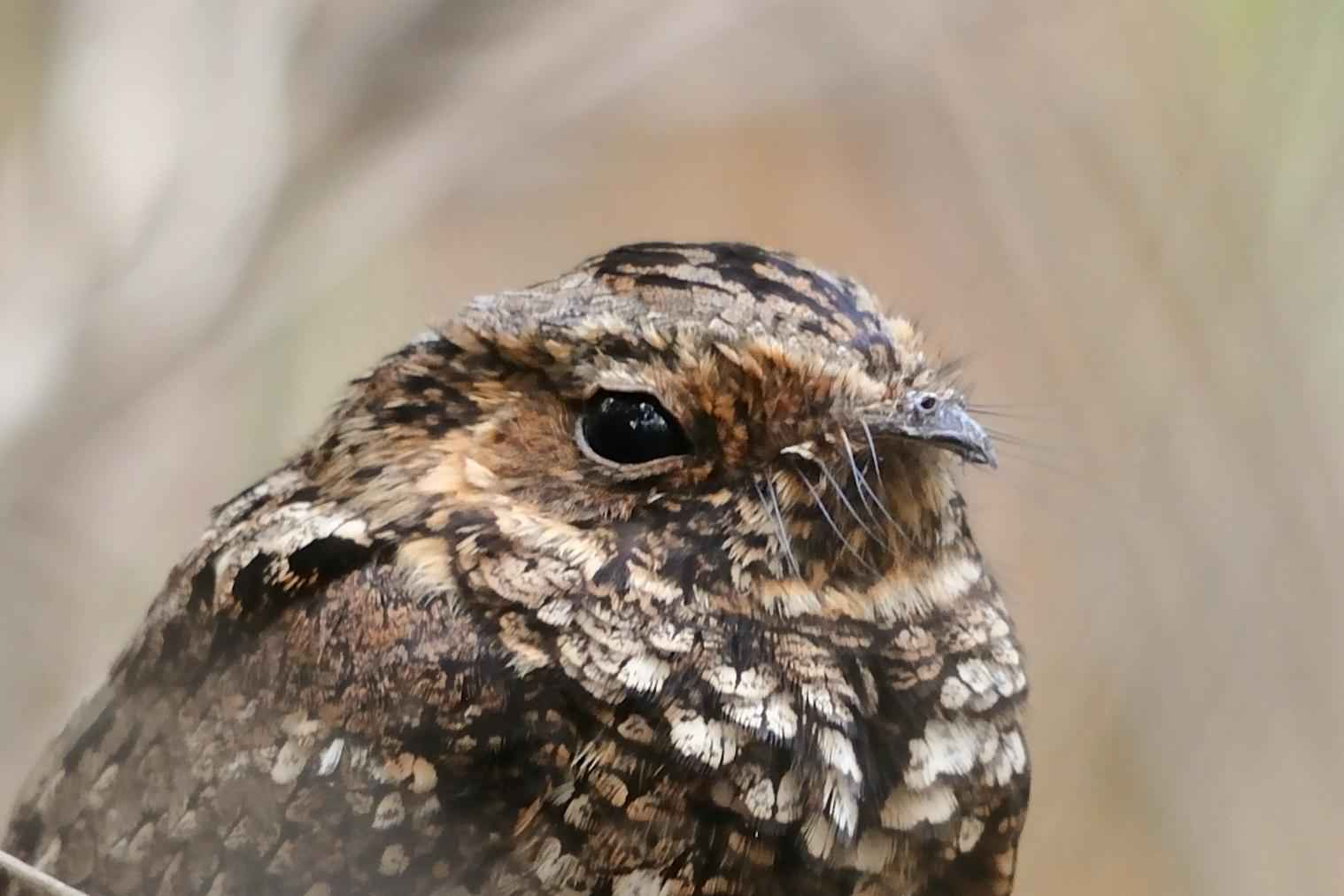
Puerto Rican nightjar

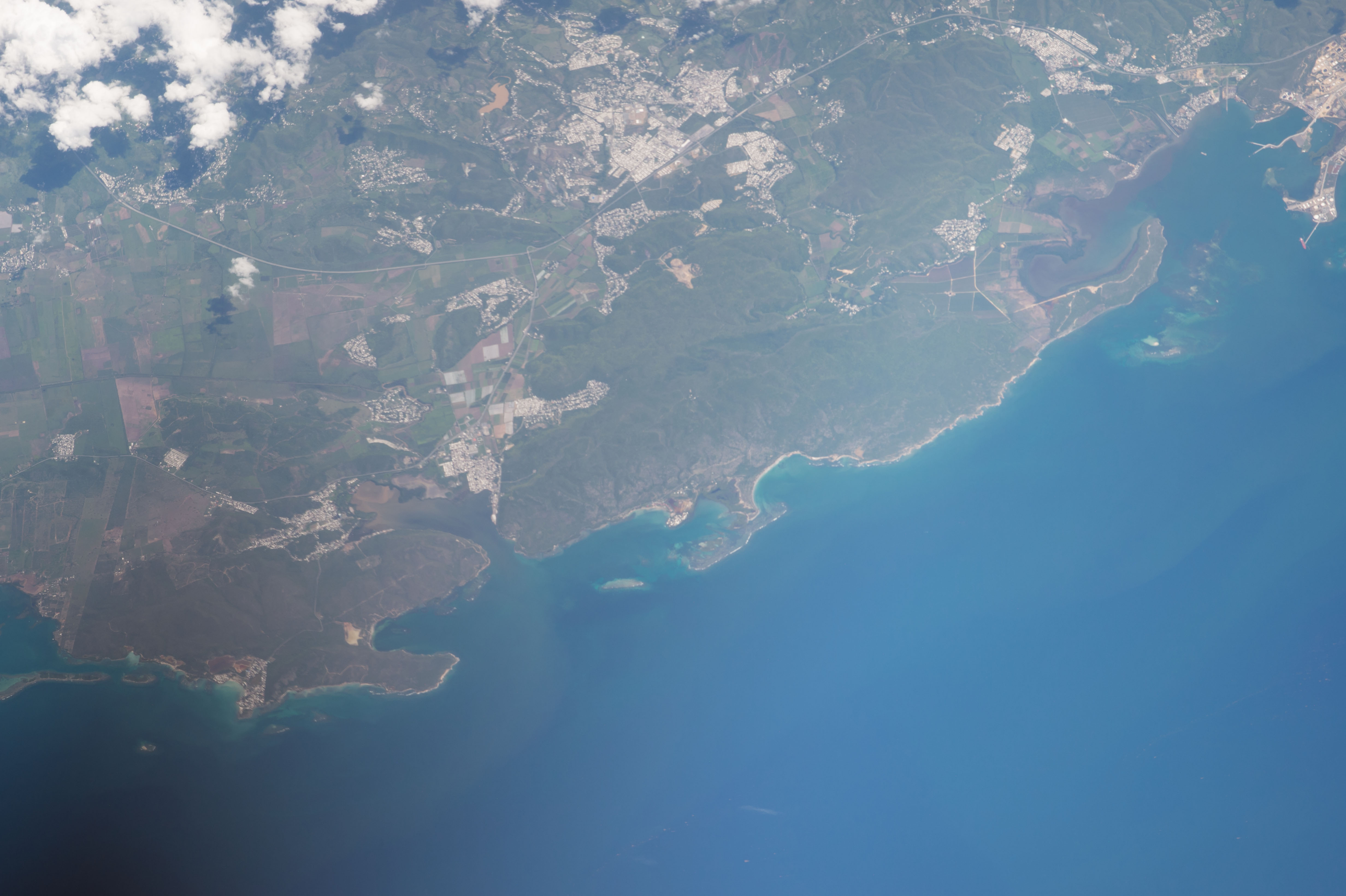
View of the dry forest area, between the Guánica and Guayanilla Bays, from the International Space Station.

== See also ==
- List of Puerto Rico state forests
- List of National Natural Landmarks in Puerto Rico
