= Puerto Rican dry forests =

Dry forests in southern Puerto Rico

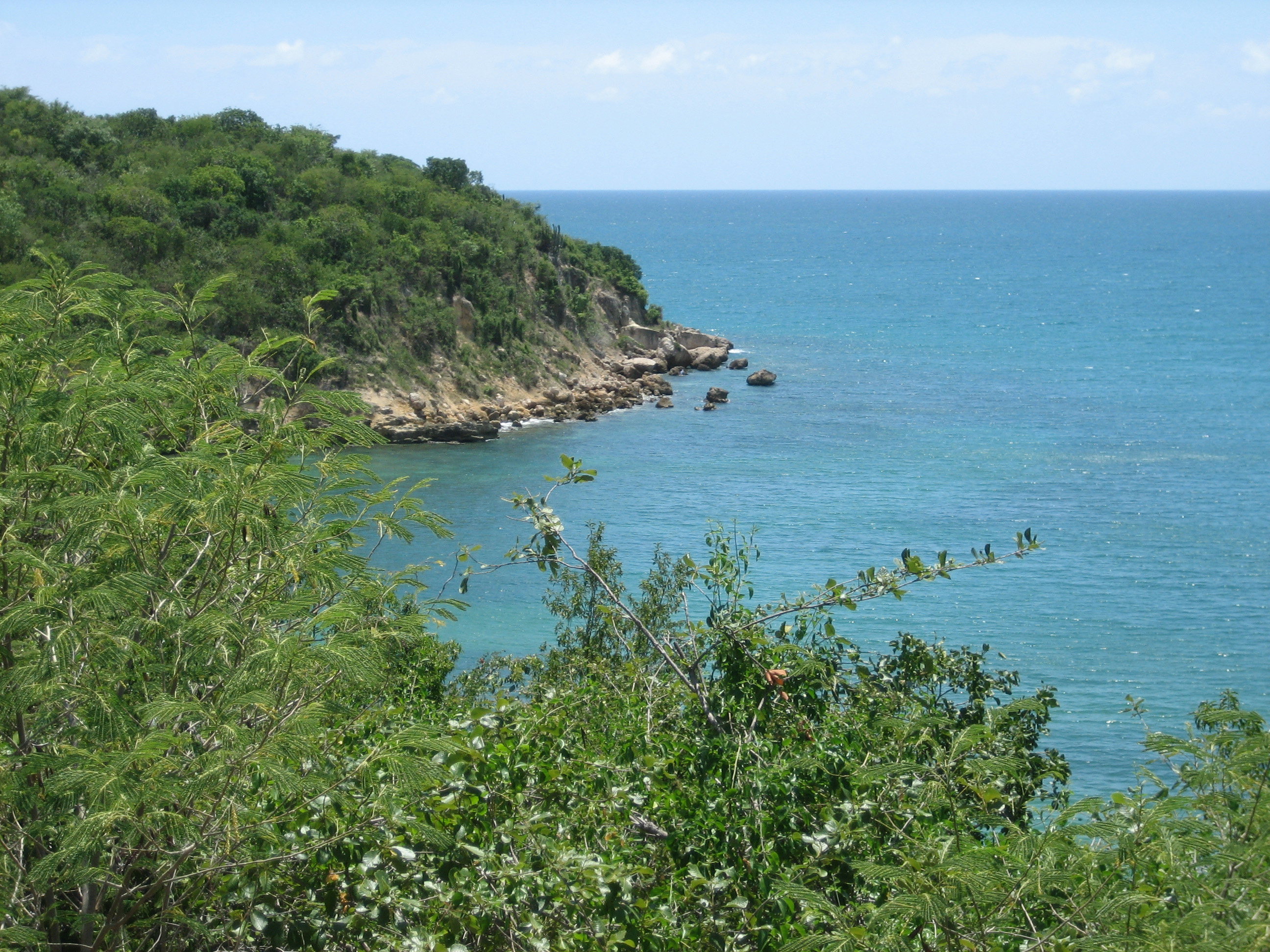
- Dry forest in Guánica State Forest

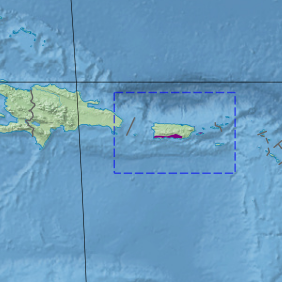
- Ecoregion territory (in purple)

Ecology
- Realm: Neotropic
- Biome: Tropical and subtropical dry broadleaf forests
- Borders: Puerto Rican moist forests

Geography
- Area: 1,159 km^{2} (447 mi^{2})
- Country: United States
- Commonwealth: Puerto Rico

Conservation
- Conservation status: Critical/Endangered
- Protected: 196 km^{2} (17%)

The Puerto Rican dry forests are a tropical dry forest ecoregion located in southwestern and eastern Puerto Rico and on the offshore islands. They cover an area of 1,300 km^{2} (500 sq mi). These forests grow in areas receiving less than 1,000 mm (39 in) of rain annually. Many of the trees are deciduous, losing their leaves during the dry season which normally lasts from December to April.

== Geography ==
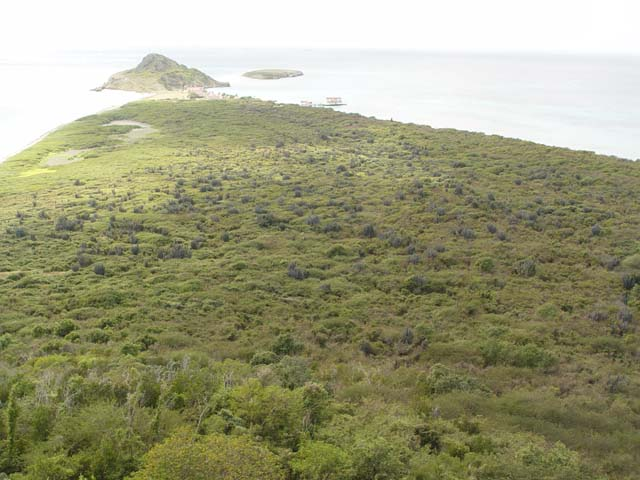
Puerto Rican dry forest on Caja de Muertos, south of Ponce

The dry forest life zone exist in two areas on the island of Puerto Rico - along the south coast of the island (in the dry orographic rain shadow of the Cordillera Central) and in the northeastern corner of the island near Fajardo, where the combination of low elevation and strong winds off the ocean result in a dry environment. Dry forests also exist on the adjacent off-shore islands of Culebra, Mona, Monito, Desecheo, Caja de Muertos, Cayo Santiago and most of the island of Vieques.

Dry forests along the south coast cover a 120-kilometre (75 mi) strip of land from Guayama in the east to Cabo Rojo in the west, and extends 3–20 kilometres (2–12 mi) inland from the coast.

== Climate ==
The climate is seasonal with most rainfall between May and November. Average rainfall on the south coastal strip ranged from 600–1,000 millimetres (24–39 in).

== Ecology ==
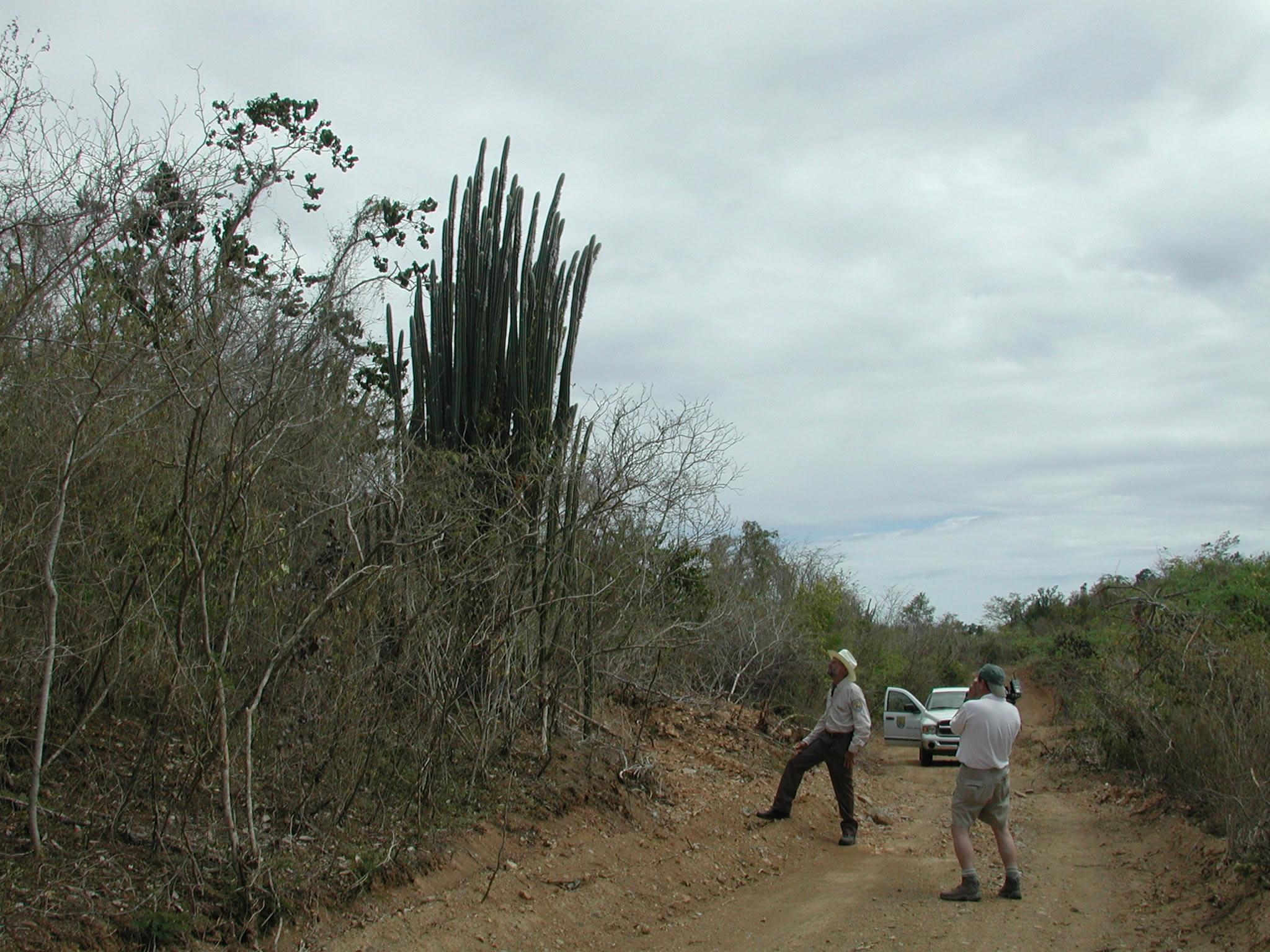
Subtropical dry forest on Vieques, Puerto Rico.

Puerto Rican dry forests (like Caribbean dry forests in general) consist of short-stature (usually <5 m or 16 ft tall), multi-stemmed trees. The canopy is largely evergreen (dominated by Gymnanthes lucida in areas of limestone soil), while the emergent layer is considerably more dry-season deciduous.

=== Vegetation types ===
Plant community types exist along a continuum of soil moisture availability, which is itself influenced by soil depth, and the orientation and the slope of the land (which affects runoff). Coastal vegetation includes mangrove, salt flats and beach thickets. Further inland, scrub forest grows on exposed limestone with scattered depressions. Deeper soils support deciduous forests with taller semi-evergreen forests growing on moister sites. The degree of deciduousness varies with water stress—drought–deciduous species retain more of their leaves in wetter years and lose more of them in drier years—and even in the deciduous forests, many trees are evergreen.

=== Flora ===
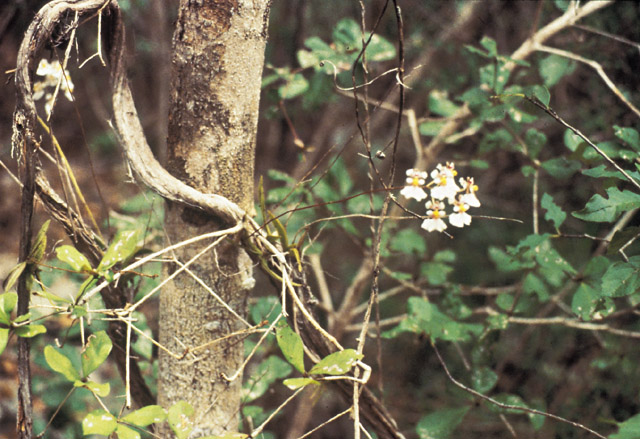
Psychilis krugii, an endemic orchid of dry limestone forests of Puerto Rico at the Guánica State Forest.

Puerto Rican dry forests are dominated by plants in the families Rubiaceae, Euphorbiaceae, and Myrtaceae. In this regard they are similar to Jamaican dry forests, but differ from dry forests on the mainland of South and Central America, which are dominated by Fabaceae and Bignoniaceae.

Guaiacum officinale, Coccoloba venosa, Ceiba pentandra, and Capparis cynophallophora are common trees in coastal dry forests. Dry limestone forest species include Pisonia albida, Guaiacum sanctum, and Plumeria alba. Trichilia triacantha, a federally listed endangered species, is known only from the dry forest zone in southwestern Puerto Rico.

=== Fauna ===
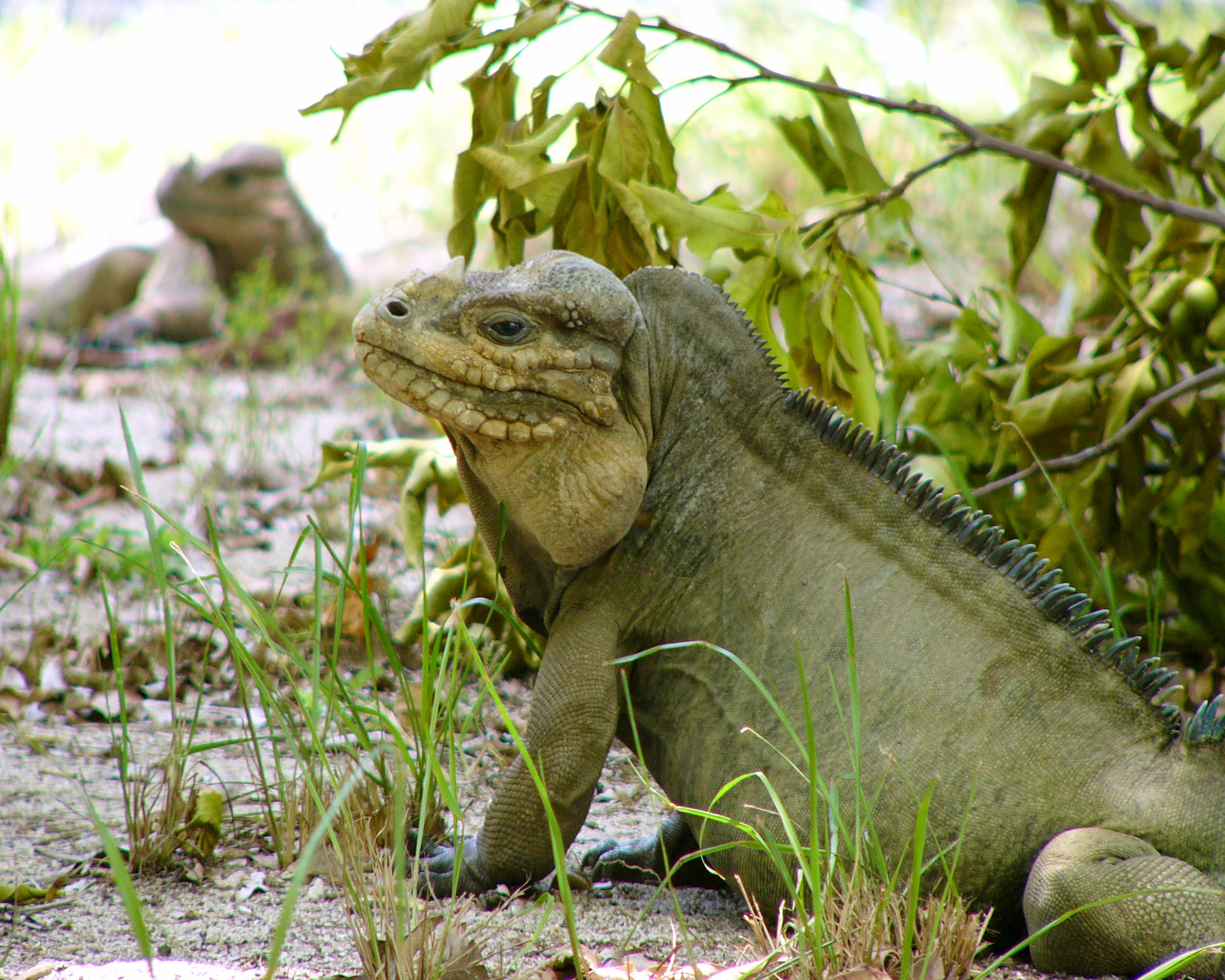
The Mona ground iguana is endemic to dry forest on the island of Mona.

Puerto Rican dry forest support a diverse avifauna; 185 bird species have been recorded in Guánica Forest including 15 endemic species. The endangered Puerto Rican nightjar is restricted to dry and moist forests in southwestern Puerto Rico. The Puerto Rican crested toad, the only native toad in Puerto Rico, is known from only one remaining population in Guánica Forest.

Thirteen species of lizards are known from the southern dry forests including two anole endemic to the dry forest zone- Anolis poncensis and Anolis cooki. The Mona ground iguana is endemic to dry forest on the island of Mona.

Non-native mammals in the dry forest zone include rhesus macaques and patas monkeys, both of which have become serious agricultural pests, and the Javan mongoose which was introduced to Puerto Rico in the 1870s.

=== Conservation ===
Although most of the forest was destroyed for agriculture prior to the 1940s, some patches of forest which pre-date that period still exist. Areas that were used for charcoal production or for fence-posts have recovered rapidly - after 50 years forests that had been used for charcoal production recovered to the point where they were indistinguishable from much older forests.

In addition, large areas of secondary forest have grown back on abandoned agricultural land. Unlike areas which were only lightly used, these forests on abandoned farmland have far fewer species than do natural forests. Their path to recovery remains uncertain.

The best example of dry forests in Puerto Rico are in the Guánica State Forest (Bosque Estatal de Guánica) outside the town of Guánica. This site has also been the focus of the vast majority of studies of dry forests. Other protected dry forests in Puerto Rico include the Cabo Rojo, Culebra, Desecheo and Vieques wildlife refuges (part of the Caribbean Islands National Wildlife Refuge Complex), the Caja de Muertos and the Mona and Monito Islands Natural Reserves, among other smaller protected areas along the southern coast of the island.

== See also ==
- List of ecoregions in the United States (WWF)
