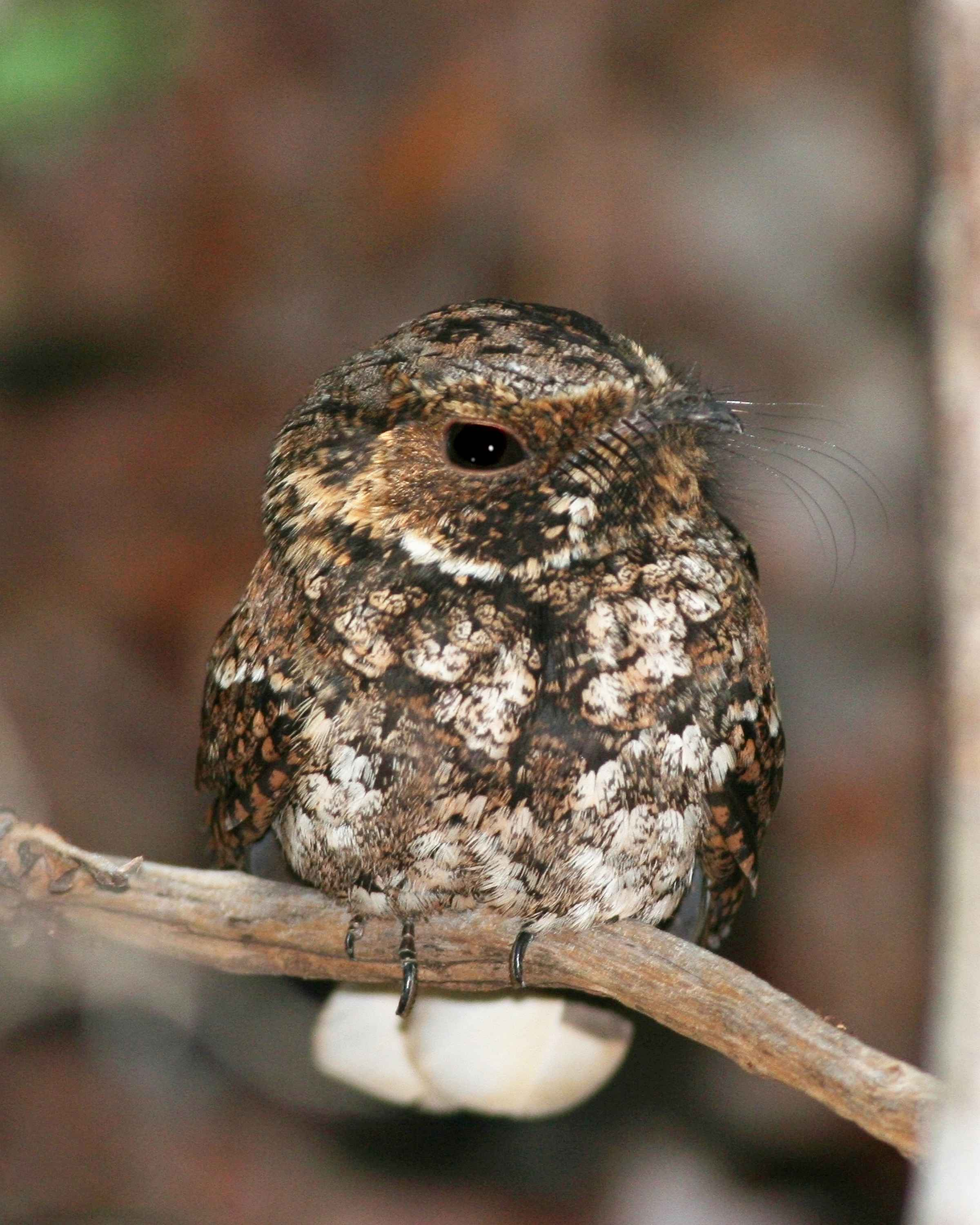

Conservation status
- Vulnerable (IUCN 3.1)

Scientific classification
- Kingdom: Animalia
- Phylum: Chordata
- Class: Aves
- Order: Caprimulgiformes
- Family: Caprimulgidae
- Genus: Antrostomus
- Species: A. noctitherus

Binomial name
- Antrostomus noctitherus (Wetmore, 1919)

Synonyms
- Caprimulgus noctitherus (Wetmore, 1919)

= Puerto Rican nightjar =

Species of bird

The Puerto Rican nightjar, Puerto Rican whip-poor-will or guabairo (Antrostomus noctitherus) is a bird in the nightjar family found in the coastal dry scrub forests in localized areas of southwestern Puerto Rico. It was described in 1916 from bones found in a cave in north central Puerto Rico and a single skin specimen from 1888, and was considered extinct until observed in the wild in 1961. The current population is estimated as 1,400-2,000 mature birds, which is presumed to be a stable size for this species; therefore, even though it faces pressures from habitat loss it is currently classified as Vulnerable.

== Description ==
Puerto Rican nightjars, whose song is composed of rapid "whip" notes, are small birds about 22–23 cm in length, weighing 39–41 g. Similar to the Antillean nighthawk, the species has a mottled, black, brown and gray colored plumage which serves as camouflage while the bird is perched on the ground. Males have a black throat with a white thin horizontal line. There are white spots on the lower part of the tail which are visible in flight. Females are of a buff rather than white coloration. Puerto Rican nightjars have large, dark black eyes, a short gray bill, and gray tarsi. Like all nightjars, they possess stiff bristles around the beak to help with the capture of insects in flight.

== History ==
The Puerto Rican nightjar was first discovered as a single skin specimen found in the Northern part of Puerto Rico in 1888, and rediscovered and correctly identified in 1916 when bones were discovered in a cave in northern Puerto Rico. The species was originally considered already extinct at the time of its discovery. Confirmation of living specimens only occurred in 1961 in the Guánica Dry Forest. Detailed studies of the species started in 1969.

== Distribution and habitat ==
The species is likely to have historically occurred in moist limestone and coastal forests in northern Puerto Rico, in addition to the current range of dry limestone, lower cordillera and dry coastal forest. The nightjar is presently mostly found in closed canopy dry forest on limestone soils with abundant leaf litter and an open understory. Lower densities are present in open scrubby forests. Populations have so far been confirmed in three locations in the southwest of the island: Susúa State Forest, Guánica Dry Forest and Guayanilla Hills. The first nesting record of the Puerto Rican nightjar in Maricao State Forest was reported in 2005.

== Ecology ==
The Puerto Rican nightjar feeds on beetles, moths and other insects that it catches in flight. It nests on the ground under closed canopies and needs an abundant leaf layer to hold the eggs. The peak months for nesting activity are April–June. The clutch is usually of 1–2 eggs, which are light brown with darker brown or purple patches. The eggs have an incubation period of 18–20 days and are primarily incubated by the male. The chicks are a cinnamon downy color and they start to fly at about 14 days after hatching. Like many ground-nesting birds, the nightjar will try to divert the attention of potential predators away from the nest by conspicuously flying away and vibrating its wings. The species may be permanently territorial.

== Conservation status ==
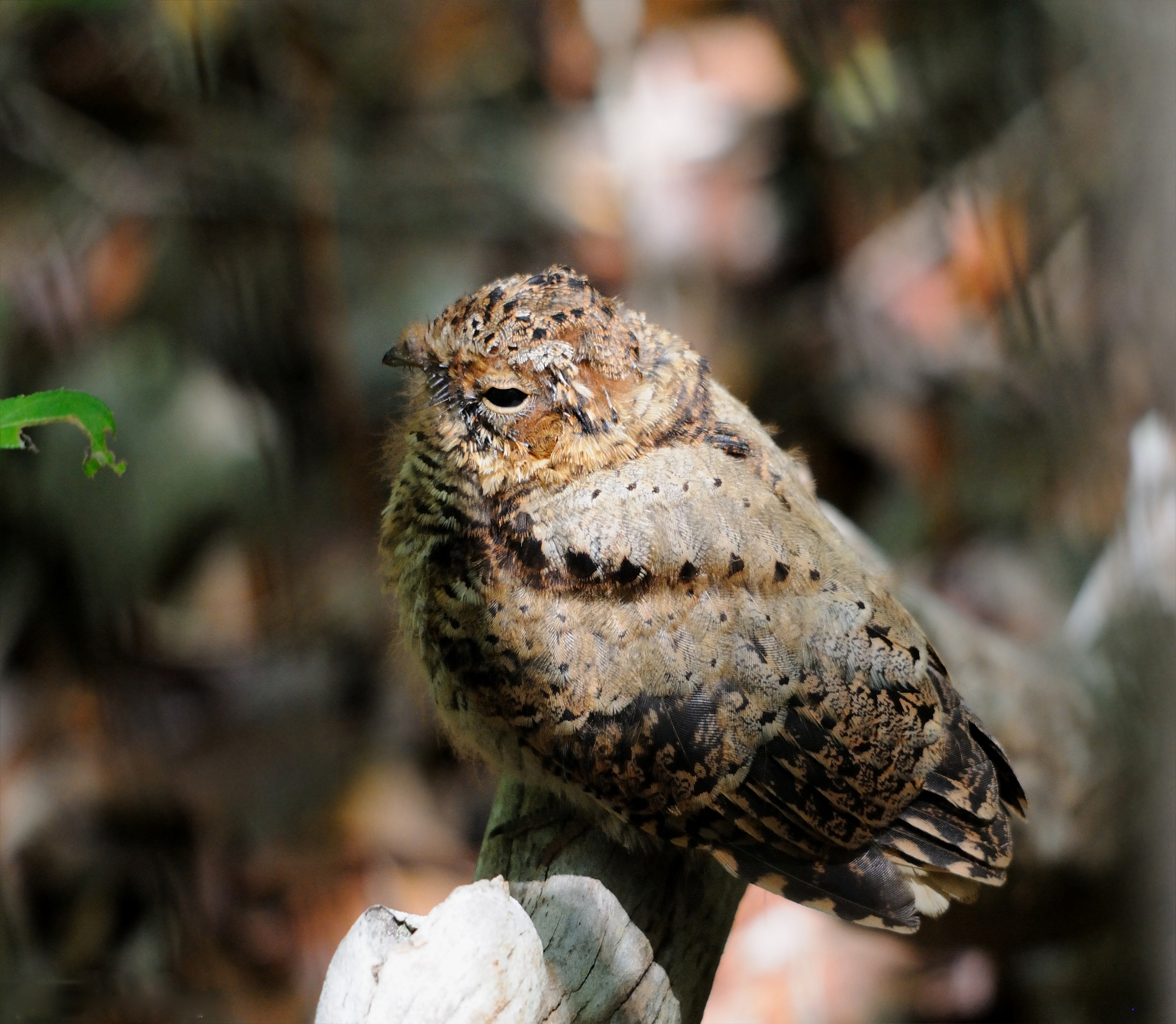
Juvenile

Estimates of the breeding population of Puerto Rican nightjars in 1962 were of less than 100 pairs. In 1968, the species was added to the endangered species list of the United States Fish and Wildlife Service and the IUCN Red List, where it was originally classified as Threatened. It was uplisted to Critically Endangered in 1994, but downlisted again to Endangered in 2011, after the population had been assessed as small but essentially stable. As of 2023, the species has been downlisted to Vulnerable, with current estimates of 2,700 – 9,900 mature birds. The species is legally protected throughout its range.

Puerto Rican nightjars are considered to be under pressure from habitat loss due to urban development and agricultural expansion, and through predation by introduced predators such as the small Indian mongoose and feral cats, and native predators such as owls. It is possible that the large scale deforestation that occurred during the late 1800s and the beginning of the 1900s is the reason that the nightjars are no longer found on the north part of the island.

Mitigating habitat impact on private lands and controlling public access to the forest reserves during their peak nesting season has been suggested as a conservation management technique for this species.

== Gallery ==
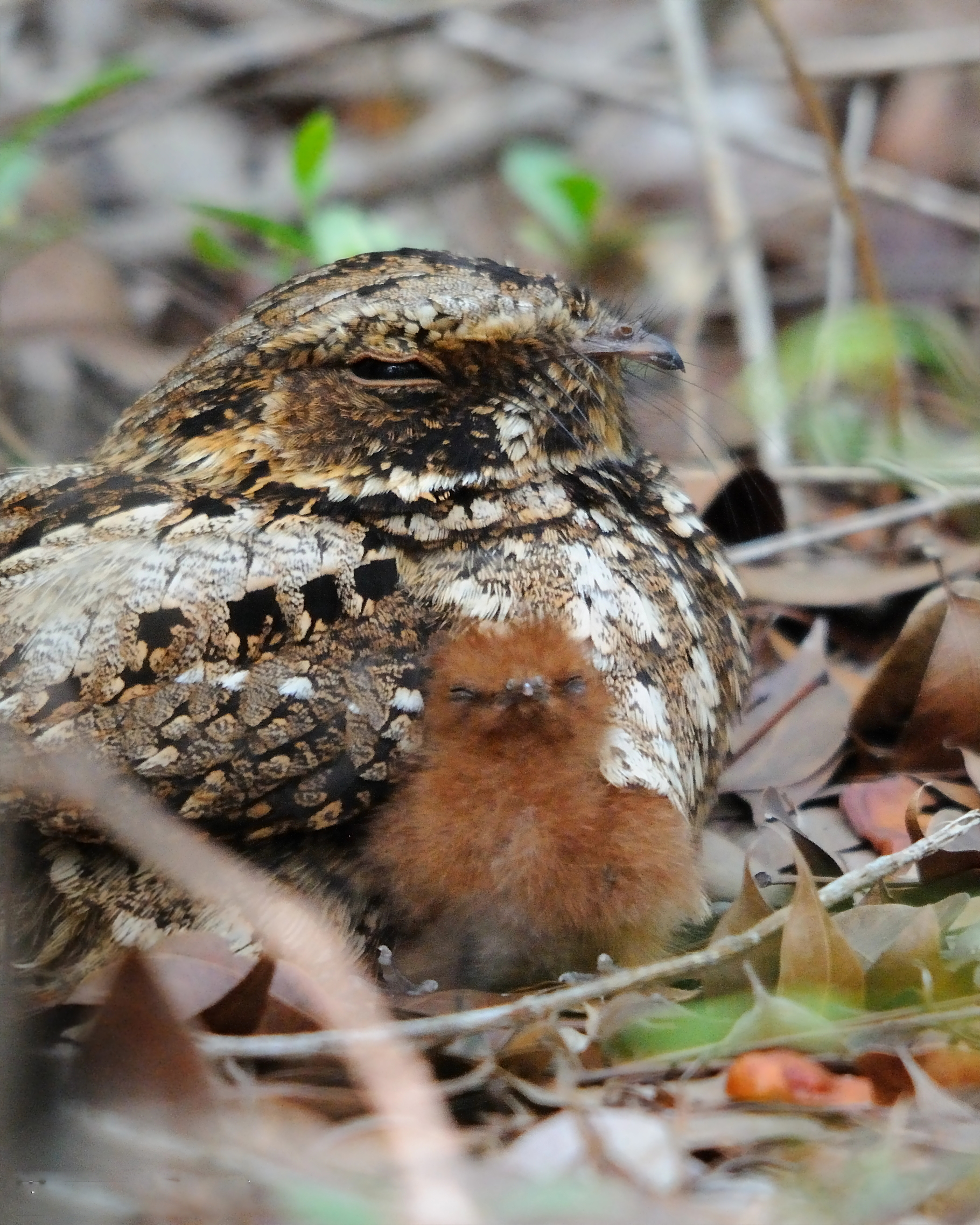
Adult and chick

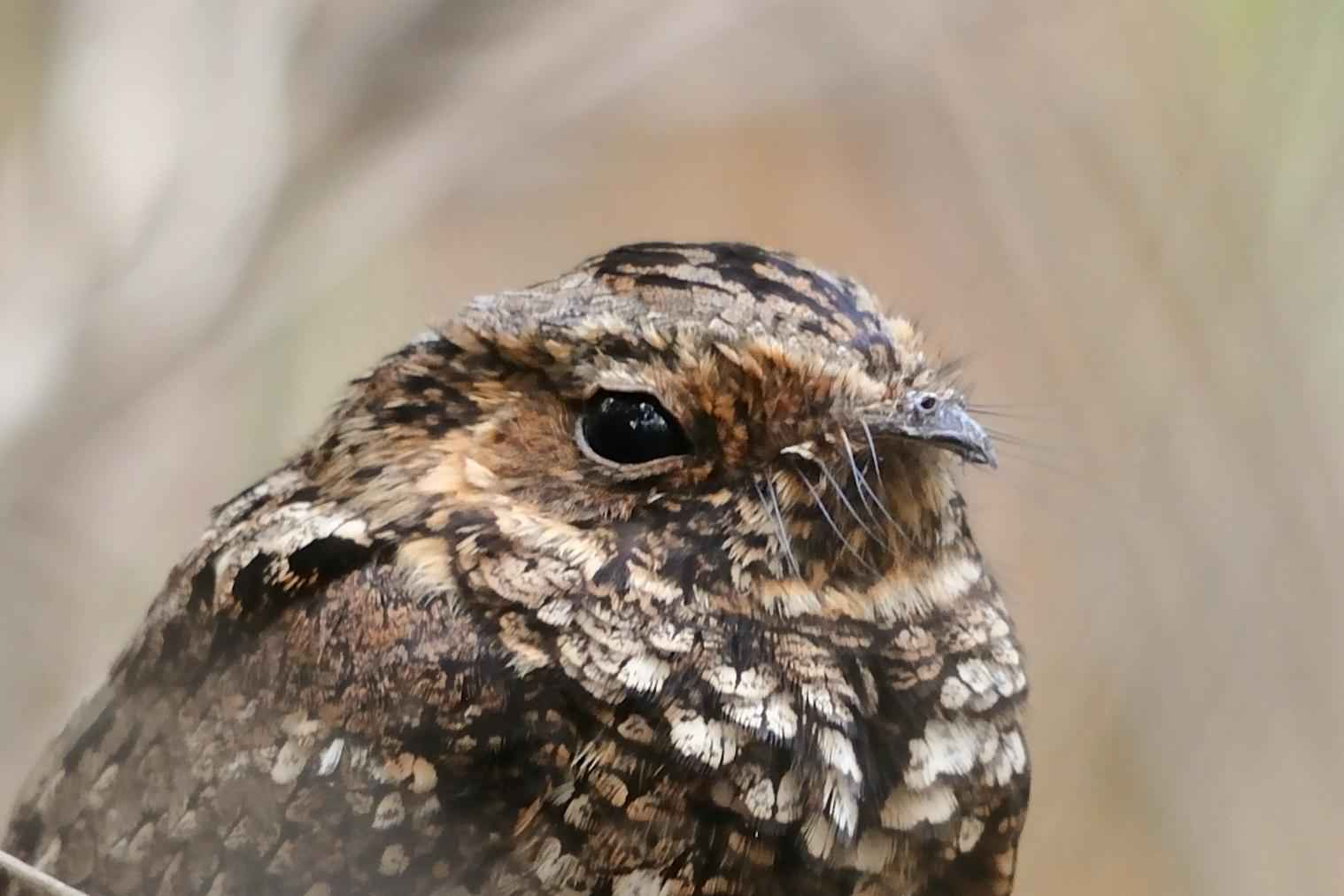
Facial features

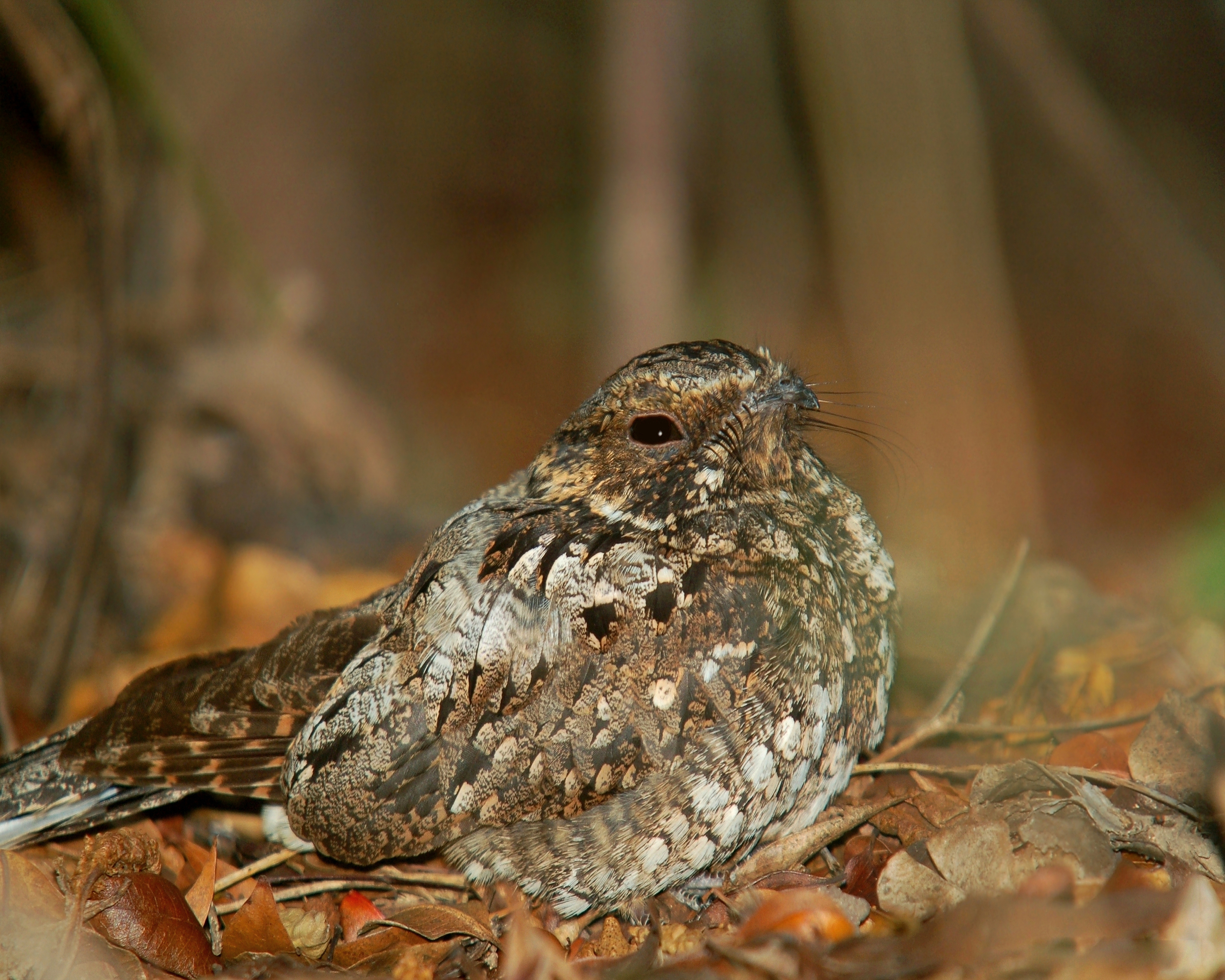
In habitat

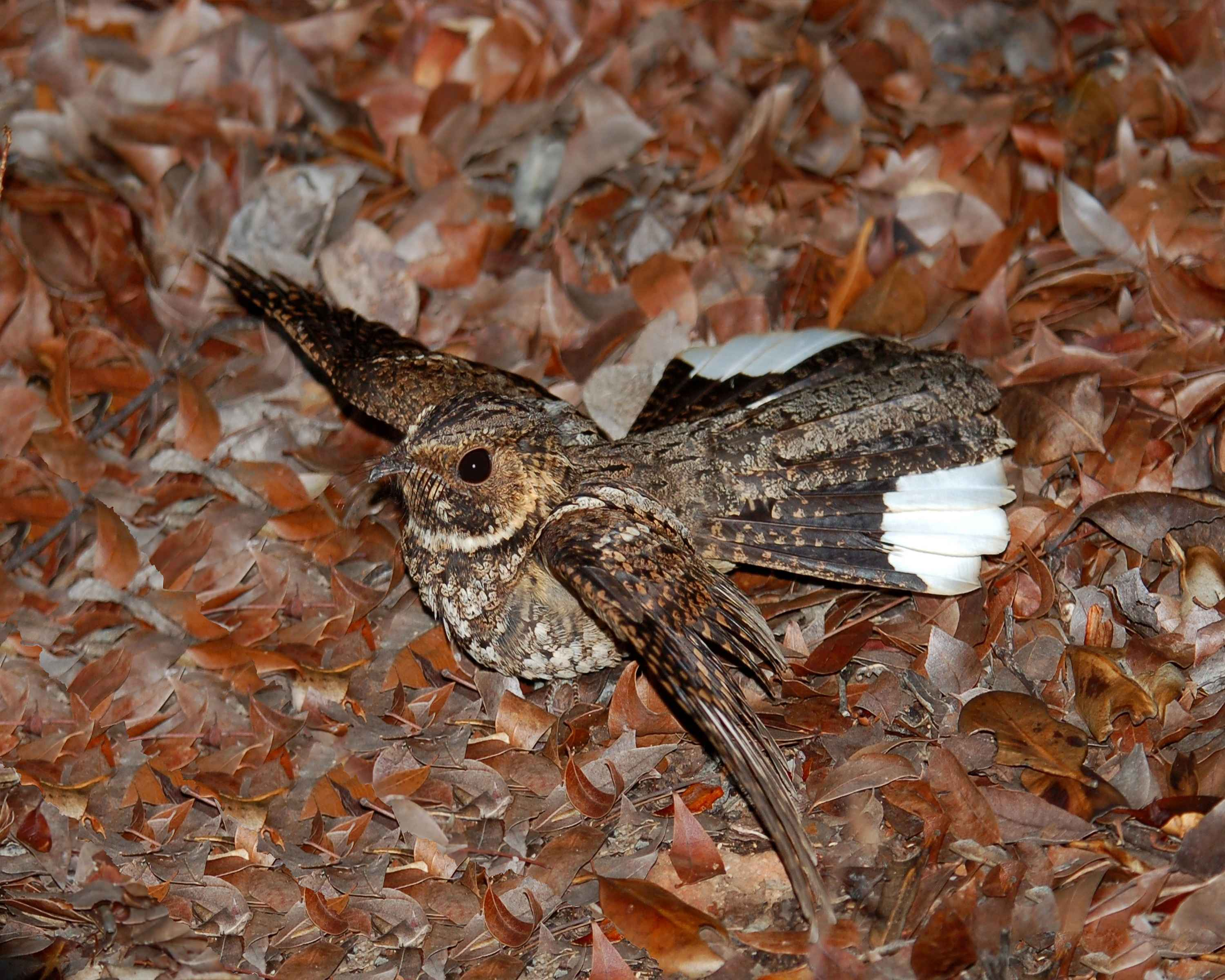
Male taking flight

== See also ==
- Fauna of Puerto Rico
- List of birds of Puerto Rico
- List of endemic fauna of Puerto Rico
- List of Puerto Rican birds
- List of Vieques birds
- El Toro Wilderness
