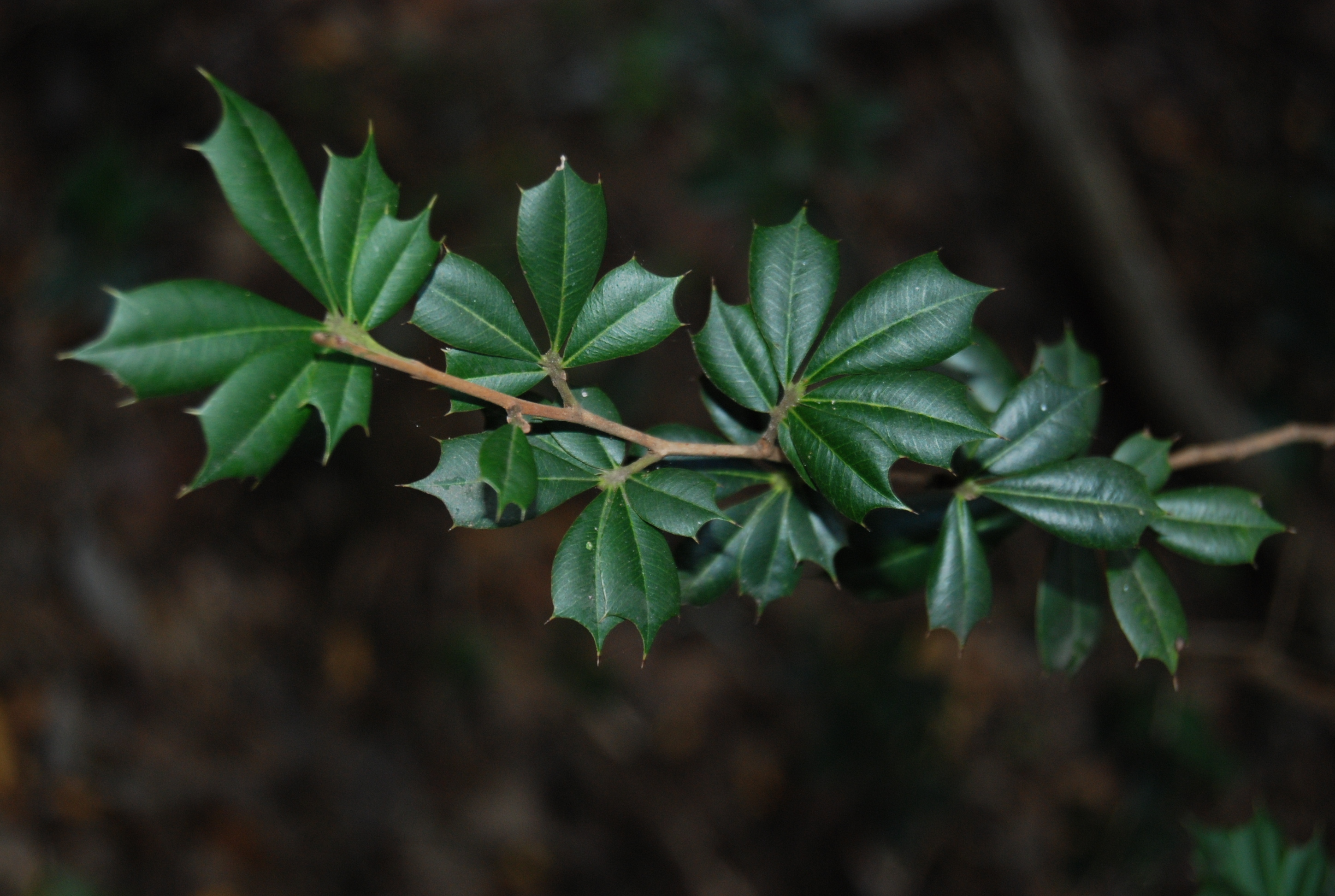

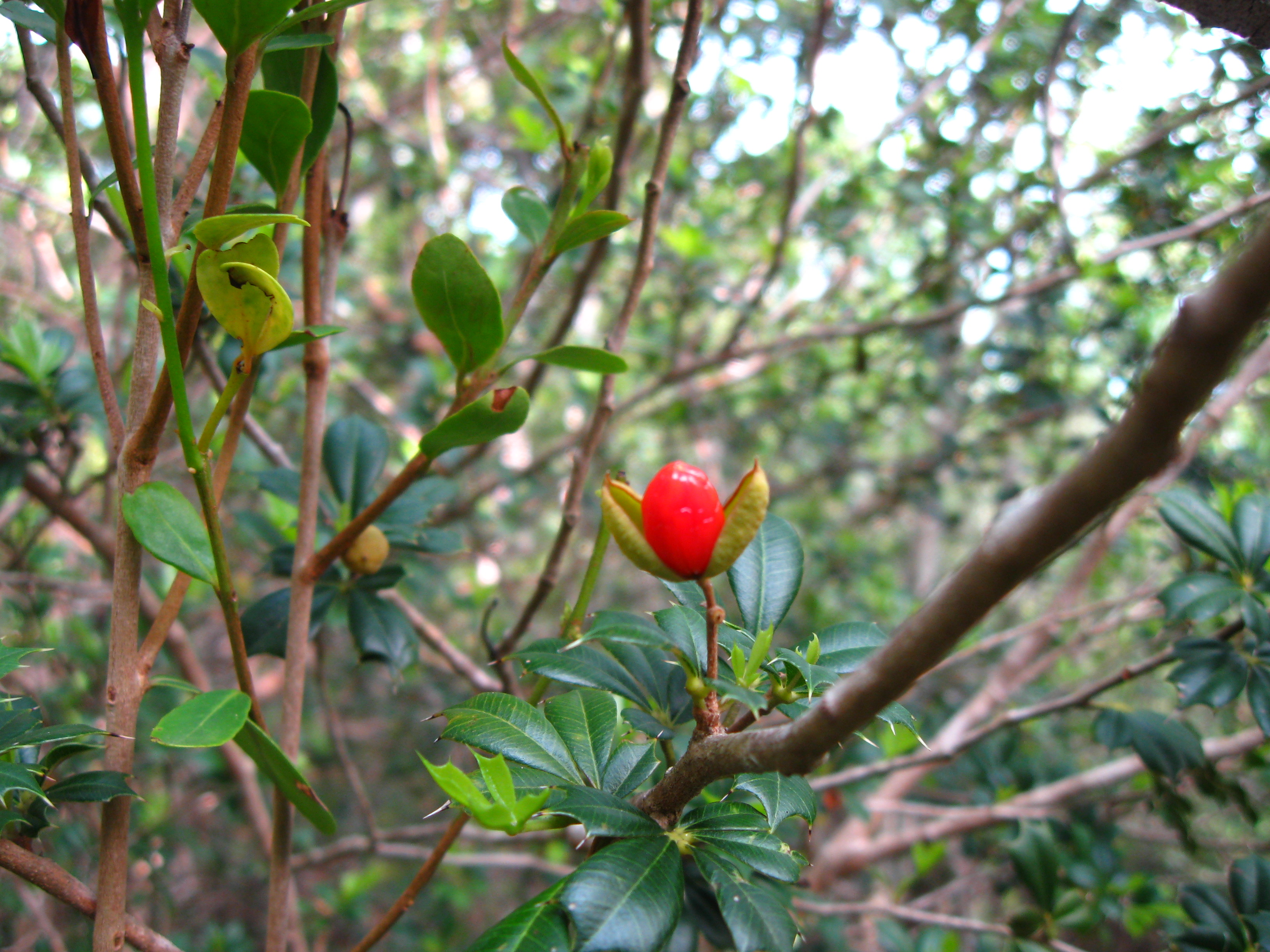
- Fruit

Conservation status
- Endangered (IUCN 3.1)

- Critically Imperiled (NatureServe)

Scientific classification
- Kingdom: Plantae
- Clade: Tracheophytes
- Clade: Angiosperms
- Clade: Eudicots
- Clade: Rosids
- Order: Sapindales
- Family: Meliaceae
- Genus: Trichilia
- Species: T. triacantha

Binomial name
- Trichilia triacantha Urb.

= Trichilia triacantha =

Species of flowering plant

Trichilia triacantha, the bariaco, is a species of plant in the family Meliaceae. It is endemic to Puerto Rico.

== Description ==
The bariaco is a shrub or a tree reaching up to 9 m (30 ft) tall. It has leaves made up of several leathery, spine-toothed leaflets and the flowers are white. The fruit is a capsule with a red aril.

== Habitat ==
The plant grows in dry forest habitat on limestone substrates, often near intermittent streams.

== Conservation ==
As of 2007 there were 10 populations of the tree containing a total of 109 individuals. 47 of these were found to be fertile. Six of the ten populations were located in the Guánica National Forest. Two of these were composed of single individuals located several kilometers from other members of the species, and so are unlikely to reproduce.

This plant has been overharvested because its wood is useful and attractive. It is additionally threatened by habitat loss, and as such is a federally listed endangered species of the United States.
