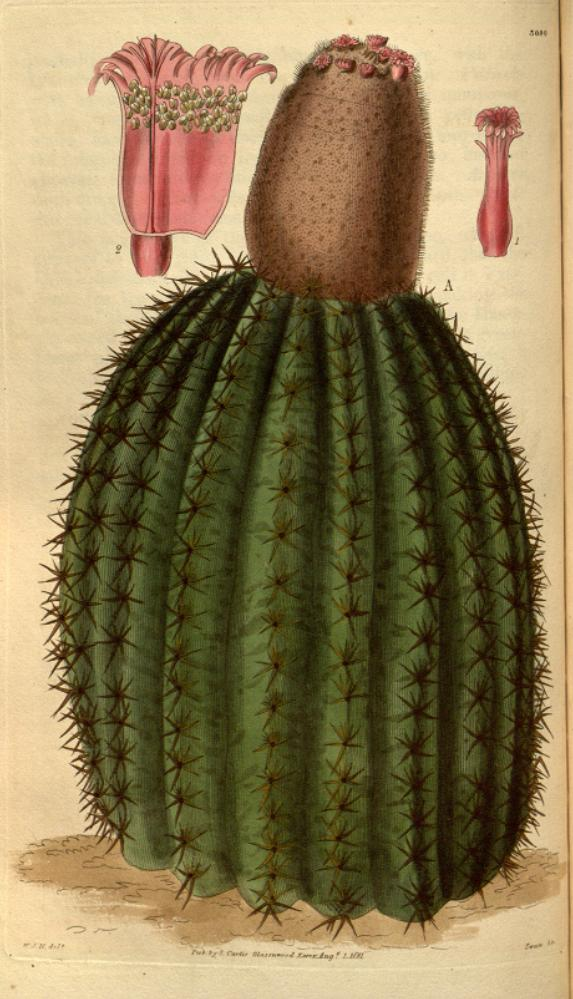

Conservation status
- Least Concern (IUCN 3.1)

Scientific classification
- Kingdom: Plantae
- Clade: Embryophytes
- Clade: Tracheophytes
- Clade: Angiosperms
- Clade: Eudicots
- Order: Caryophyllales
- Family: Cactaceae
- Subfamily: Cactoideae
- Genus: Melocactus
- Species: M. intortus

Binomial name
- Melocactus intortus (Mill.) Urb.

= Melocactus intortus =

Species of cactus

Turk's head cactuses in Puerto Rico (known in Spanish as melón de costa, "coast melon.")

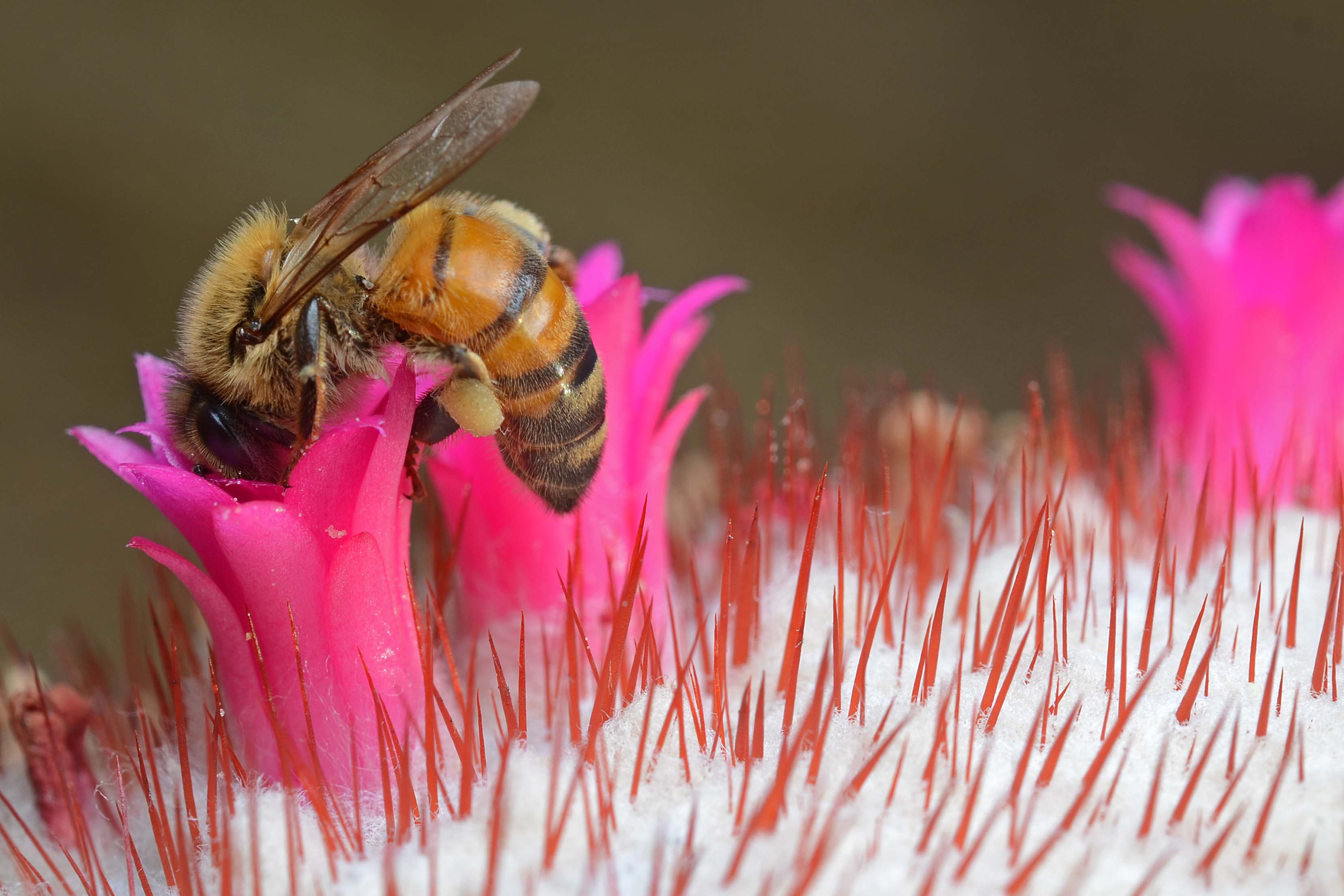
View of the M. intortus flower, being pollinated by bees.

Melocactus intortus, also known as the Turk's head cactus, is a species of cactus endemic to the Caribbean.

== Etymology ==
The Turks Islands in the Turks and Caicos are named after this cactus, whose red cephalium resembles the fez worn by Turkish men in the late Ottoman Empire. A stylised version of the cactus appears prominently on the coat of arms of the Turks and Caicos Islands.
