= Cayos de Caña Gorda =

Uninhabited island of Puerto Rico

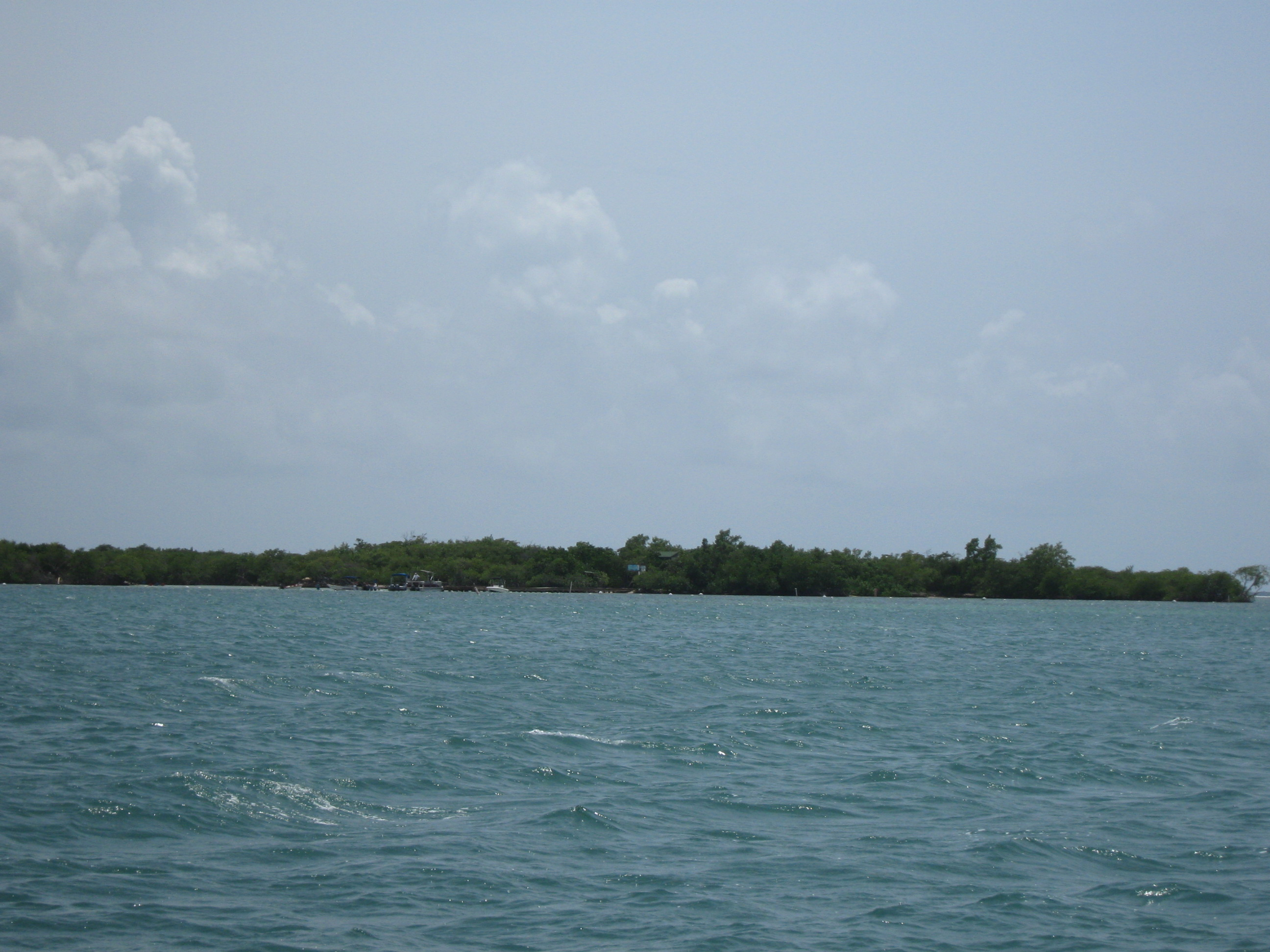
- Cayo Aurora (western key) from ferry boat

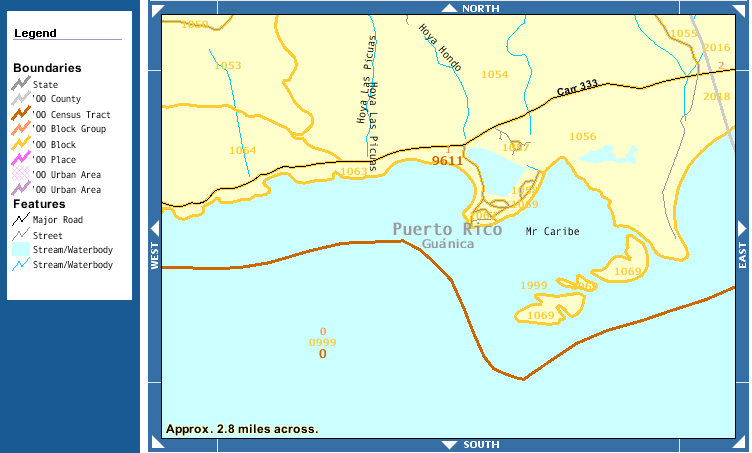
- Census 2000 map of Cayos de Caña Gorda

- Location within Puerto Rico Location within Lesser Antilles Location within the Caribbean

Geography
- Coordinates: 17°56′32″N 066°52′17″W

Administration
- United States; Puerto Rico
- Territory: Puerto Rico

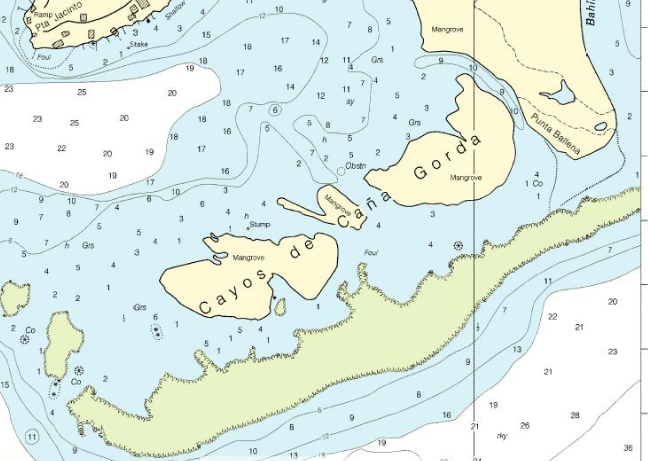
NOAA Chart of Cayos de Caña Gorda

The Cayos de Caña Gorda (English: Caña Gorda Keys or Cays) is a group of three uninhabited, mangrove-covered keys, located at 17°56′32″N 066°52′17″W off the southwestern coast of Puerto Rico. They belong to barrio Carenero of Guánica municipio. The eastern key, Isla Ballena is separated from the Puerto Rican mainland close to Punta Ballena only by a 66 foot (20 m) wide channel. The western key was given the name Gilligan's Island (after the TV series) in the 1970s by the Keegan/Barnett family, who had recently moved to Guanica from Philadelphia, Pennsylvania. Cayo Aurora is served by boat (1,969 ft (600 m) from the mainland at Punta Jacinto) and has public beaches. Between the two is Cayo Honda, the central key. The total land area is 0.069 sq mi (44 acres; 0.18 km^{2}) (Block 1069, Block Group 1, Census tract 9611, Guánica Municipio, Puerto Rico).

The area is good for snorkeling and can be reached by kayak.

== Gallery ==
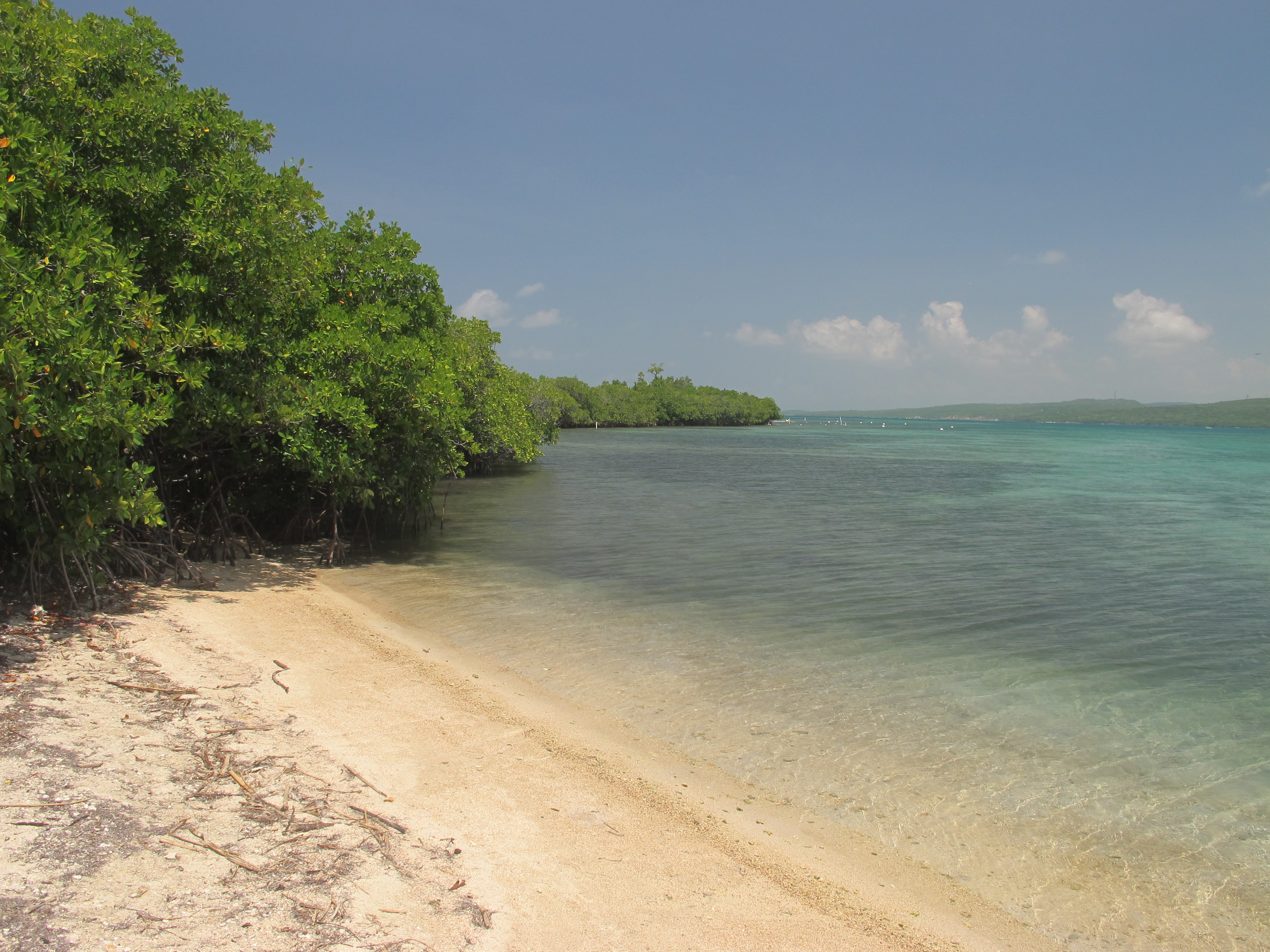
On the shore of Cayo Aurora

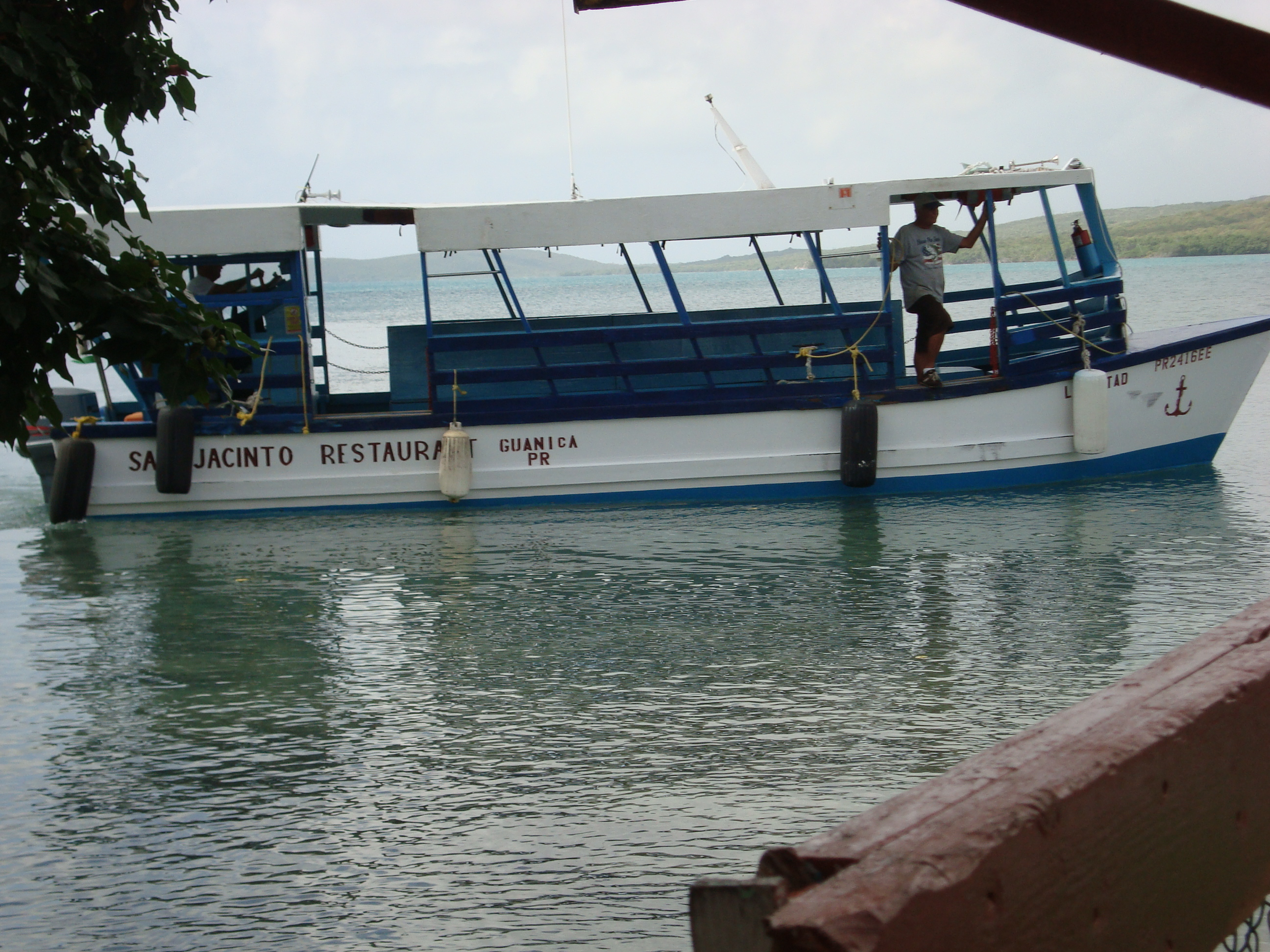
Ferry boat to Gilligan's Island

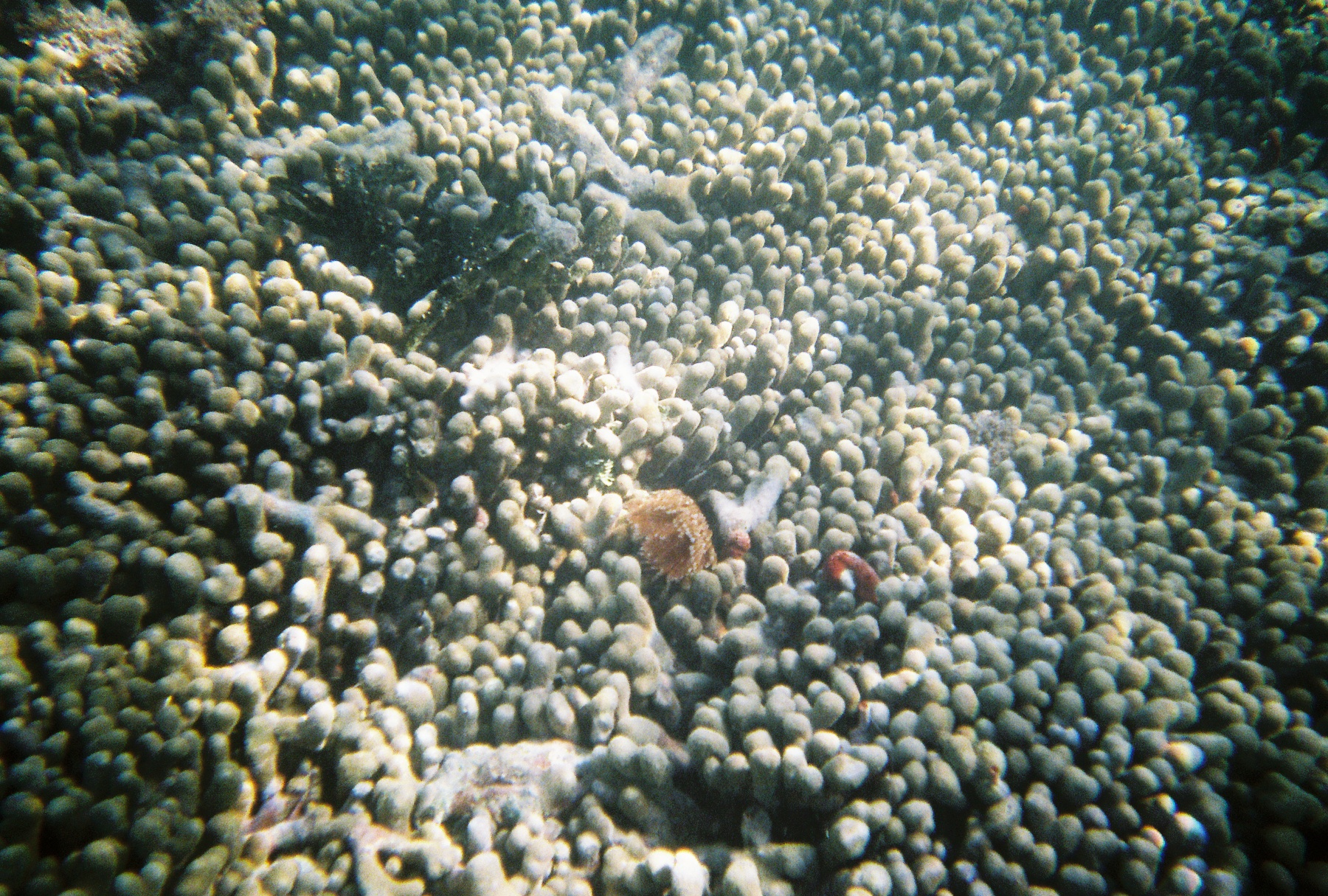
Coral formations behind Gilligan's Island

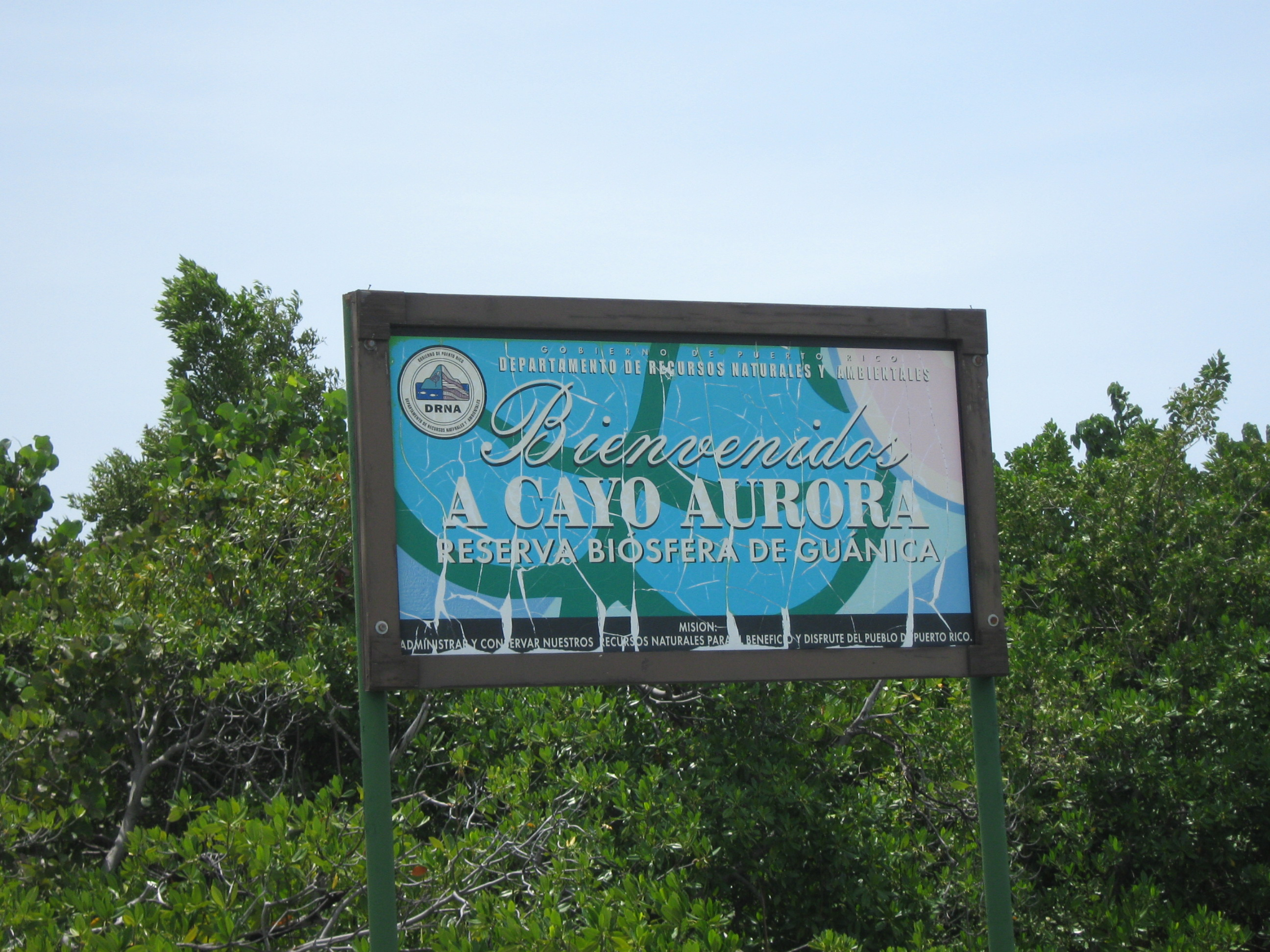
Welcome sign at boat landing of Cayo Aurora, mangrove forest in the background

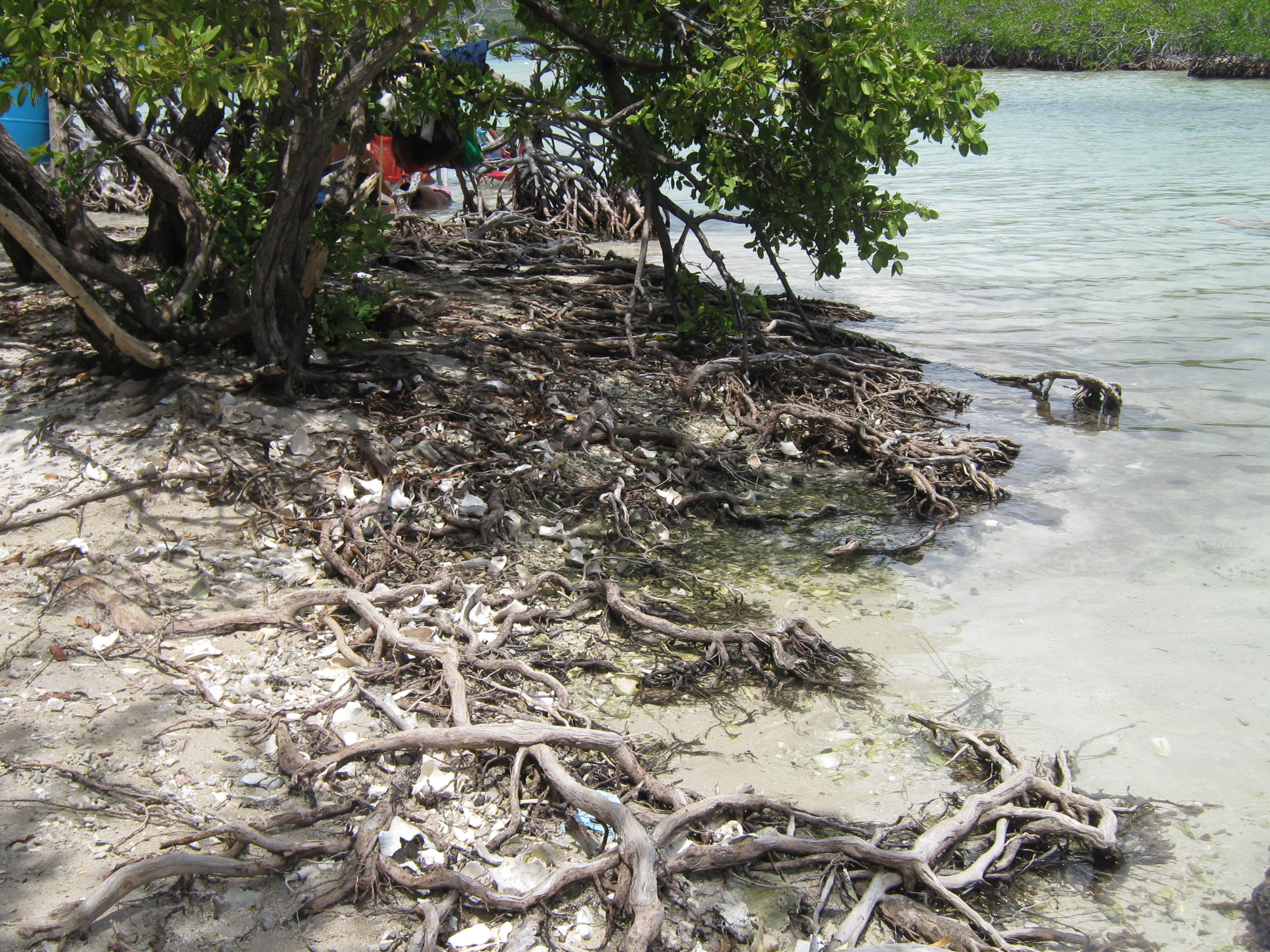
Northern mangrove-covered shore of Cayo Aurora
