= Guánica, Puerto Rico =

Town and municipality in Puerto Rico

Guánica Municipio Autónomo de Guánica
- Town and Municipality
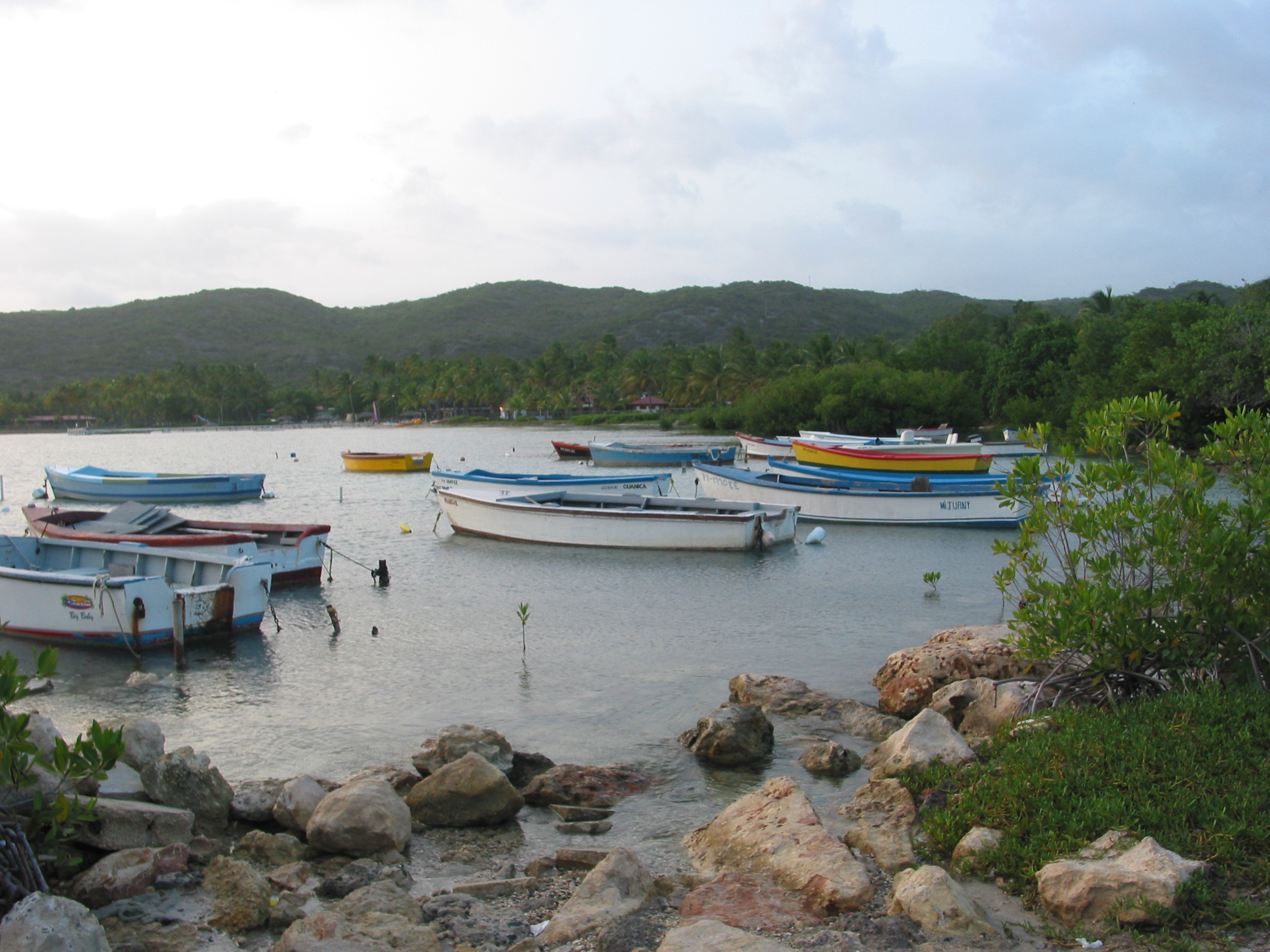
- Boats in San Jacinto Sector in Guánica barrio-pueblo

- Flag Coat of arms
- Nicknames: "Pueblo de la amistad", "El Pueblo de las Doce Calles", "Puerta de la Cultura"
- Anthem: "América es jardín del mundo"
- Map of Puerto Rico highlighting Guánica Municipality
- Coordinates: 17°58′18″N 66°54′29″W
- Sovereign state: United States
- Commonwealth: Puerto Rico
- Settled: August 12, 1508
- Founded: March 13, 1914
- Barrios: 8 barrios: Arena; Caño; Carenero; Ciénaga; Ensenada; Guánica barrio-pueblo; Montalva; Susúa Baja

Government
  - Mayor: Ismael (Titi) Rodríguez Ramos (PPD)
  - Senatorial dist.: 5 - Ponce
  - Representative dist.: 21

Area
  - Total: 53.42 sq mi (138.35 km^{2})
  - Land: 37 sq mi (96 km^{2})
  - Water: 16.35 sq mi (42.35 km^{2})

Population (2020)
  - Total: 13,787
  - Estimate (2025): 11,840 ▼
  - Rank: 71st in Puerto Rico
  - Density: 370/sq mi (140/km^{2})
- Demonym: Guaniqueños
- Time zone: UTC−4 (AST)
- ZIP Codes: 00653, 00647
- Area code: 787/939
- FIPS code: 72-31189
- GNIS feature ID: 1610855

Guánica (Spanish pronunciation: [ˈɡwanika], locally [ˈwanika]) is a town and municipality in southern Puerto Rico, bordering the Caribbean Sea, south of Sabana Grande, east of Lajas, and west of Yauco. It is part of the Yauco metropolitan statistical area.

Guánica barrio-pueblo, also known as Pueblo de Guánica, is the downtown of the municipality. Guánica's population in 2020 was 13,787 people. Guánica is located on a deeply indented harbor of the same name. The harbor resembles a tropical fjord, narrow and bordered by rugged hills, barely a quarter-mile wide, but about two miles (3.2 km) from mouth to the town. The town is about 100 miles (160 km) and over two hours' driving distance from San Juan, and about 20 miles (30 km) west of Ponce.

Guánica's postal ZIP Code is 00653 and telephone area codes are 787 and 939. The urban settlement of Ensenada has a separate postal ZIP Code of 00647.

== History ==
=== Settlement ===
Juan Ponce de León landed in the Guánica harbor on August 12, 1508, and founded a town called Guaynía, a word derived from the Taíno language that is popularly said to mean "Here is a place with water". The town, considered the first capital of the island of Puerto Rico (which was at that time named Isla de San Juan Bautista), was destroyed during the indigenous uprising of 1511, and the area was abandoned by Europeans for some years, during which time San Juan (itself at first called Puerto Rico) became the capital of the island.

The Spanish overseas province of Puerto Rico was ceded by a decadent imperial Spain in the aftermath of the Spanish–American War under the terms of the Treaty of Paris of 1898. Thus, Puerto Rico became a colony of the ascendant United States Empire. In 1899, the United States Department of War conducted a census of Puerto Rico finding that the population of Guánica was 2,700. The re-founded town of Guánica was at first a barrio of the municipality of Yauco until Guánica was established as a separate municipality on March 13, 1914. Víctor Ángel Sallaberry Safini was Guánica's first mayor.

=== Invasion ===
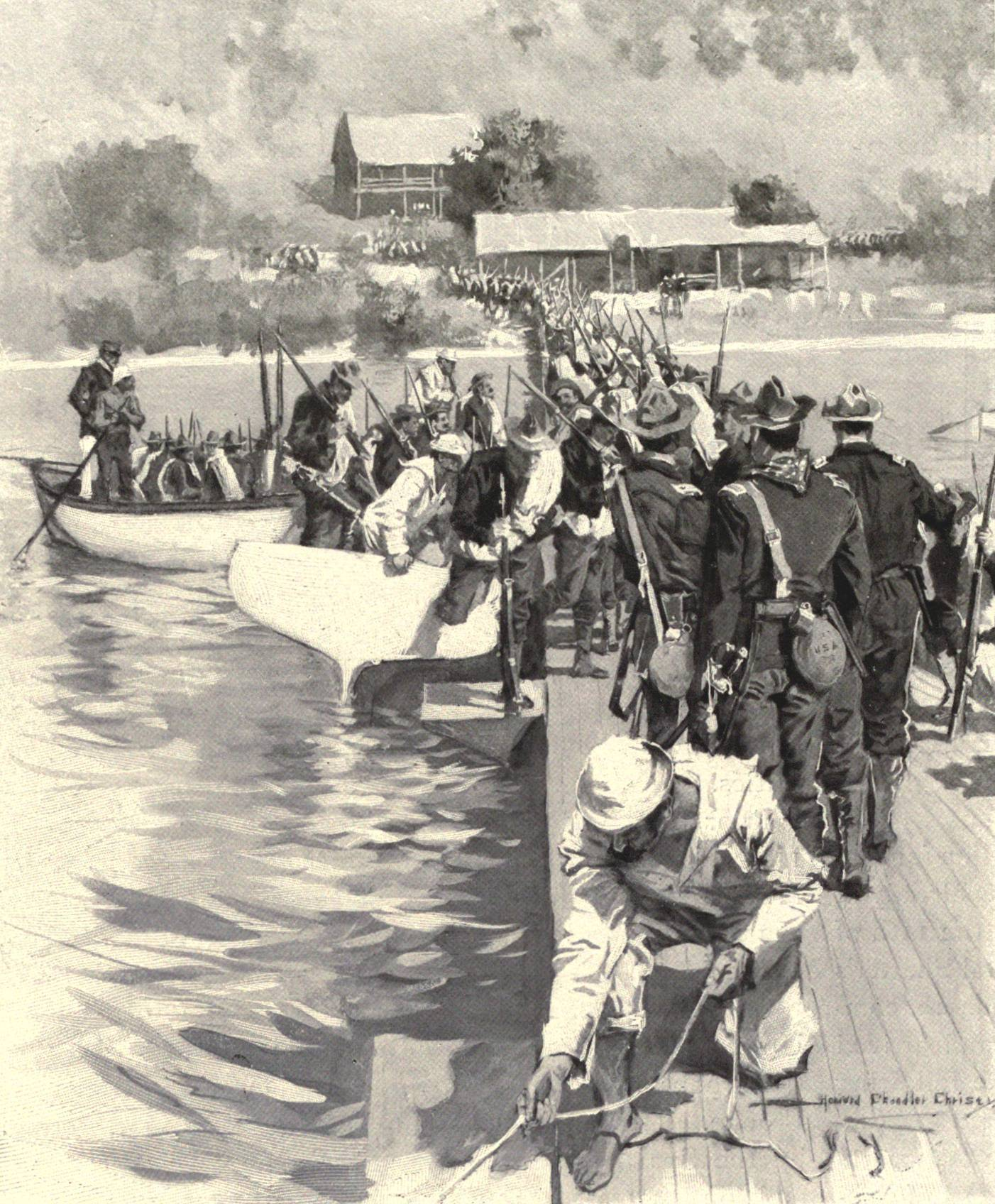
American troops landing at Guánica in 1898, by Howard Chandler Christy

On July 25, 1898, American forces (who included the young poet-writer Carl Sandburg led by General Nelson A. Miles) landed in Guánica as part of the course of the Puerto Rico campaign in the Spanish–American War. This invasion led to Puerto Rico being acquired by the United States. The invasion, just one small part of the war between Spain and United States, occurred in Guánica due to its sheltered harbor and proximity to Ponce, besides being such an unexpected site for such an attack, which had been anticipated at the heavily fortified city of San Juan. The Gloucester was the first ship to set anchor in the Bay of Guánica. Twenty-eight sailors and Marines, under the command of lieutenants H. P. Huse and Wood, departed from the ship on rafts and landed on the beach. The Marines lowered the Spanish flag from the beach flagpole and replaced it with the American flag. They then proceeded to set up a machine gun nest and placed barbed wire around their perimeter. The first land skirmish in Puerto Rico between the Puerto Rican militia and the American forces occurred when Lt. Méndez López and his men attacked and opened fire on the Americans. During the small battle which followed, the Americans returned fire with their machine gun and the Gloucester began to bombard the Spanish position. Lt. Méndez López and three of his men were wounded and the militia unit was forced to retreat to the town of Yauco. The invasion is commemorated by a contentious monument on the waterfront: along a broad paseo (el malecón), there is a large coral boulder known as the Guánica Rock (Piedra de Guánica) marked by the carved words, "3rd Battalion, 1st U.S.V. Engineers, September 16, 1898." July 25 was subsequently commemorated in Puerto Rico as Occupation Day, later renamed Constitution Day (see Public holidays in Puerto Rico).

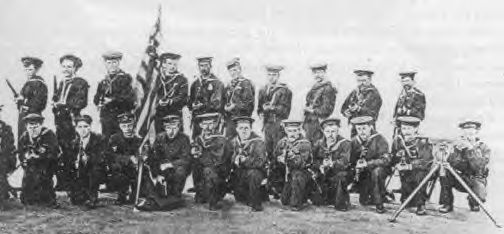
Gloucester landing team

=== Today ===
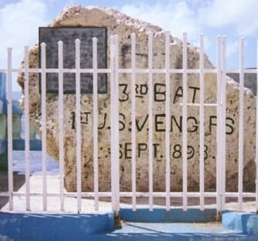
Rock in Guánica which indicates where Major General Nelson A. Miles and his men landed

Guánica is a modern town that maintains roots and connections to a traditional past. Known as el pueblo de la amistad ('the town of friendship'), it is also occasionally referred to as el pueblo de las doce calles ('the town of the twelve streets'). The central part of town consists of five streets running north–south crossing seven other streets that run east–west, resulting in a compact grid of 24 square blocks, one of which is the main town square. Facing the square are the Catholic church, city hall, a school, and many shops; the plaza itself contains greenery, walks, and a music stand. In recent years this central area of the twelve streets has been extensively supplemented by suburbs in the south and west. Hills surround the town and harbor, including the 450-foot (140 m) hill to the east of town, itself topped by the tiny Fort Caprón. Two large factories, one producing fertilizer, partially distract the eye from the pleasant landscape, but both have been important to the economy of the town, at one time dominated by the sugar plantations of Central Guánica. The resort chain known as Club Med once attempted to set up a luxury resort on beaches east of the town but withdrew due to local opposition which was apprehensive about both environmental and community degradation. East of the town some 200 acres (80.9 ha) of land, including three miles (4.8 km) of beach, have been intermittently for sale. It is a fishing village; commercial fishermen still ply their traditional trade beyond the harbor entrance. Copamarina Beach Resort & Spa offers beach access and a short boat ride to Gilligan Island, the westernmost key of the Cayos de Caña Gorda, which is a great spot to go snorkeling. The water is crystal clear and shallow, in which old pieces of coral and fish can be seen. People can walk or swim from one island to another.

On September 20, 2017, Hurricane Maria struck the island of Puerto Rico. In Guánica, 951 homes were damaged or destroyed.

On January 6, 2020, a 5.8 magnitude earthquake was felt in Guánica and nearby municipalities, and several residences and cars were destroyed. On January 7, 2020, a 6.4 magnitude earthquake hit.

== Geography ==
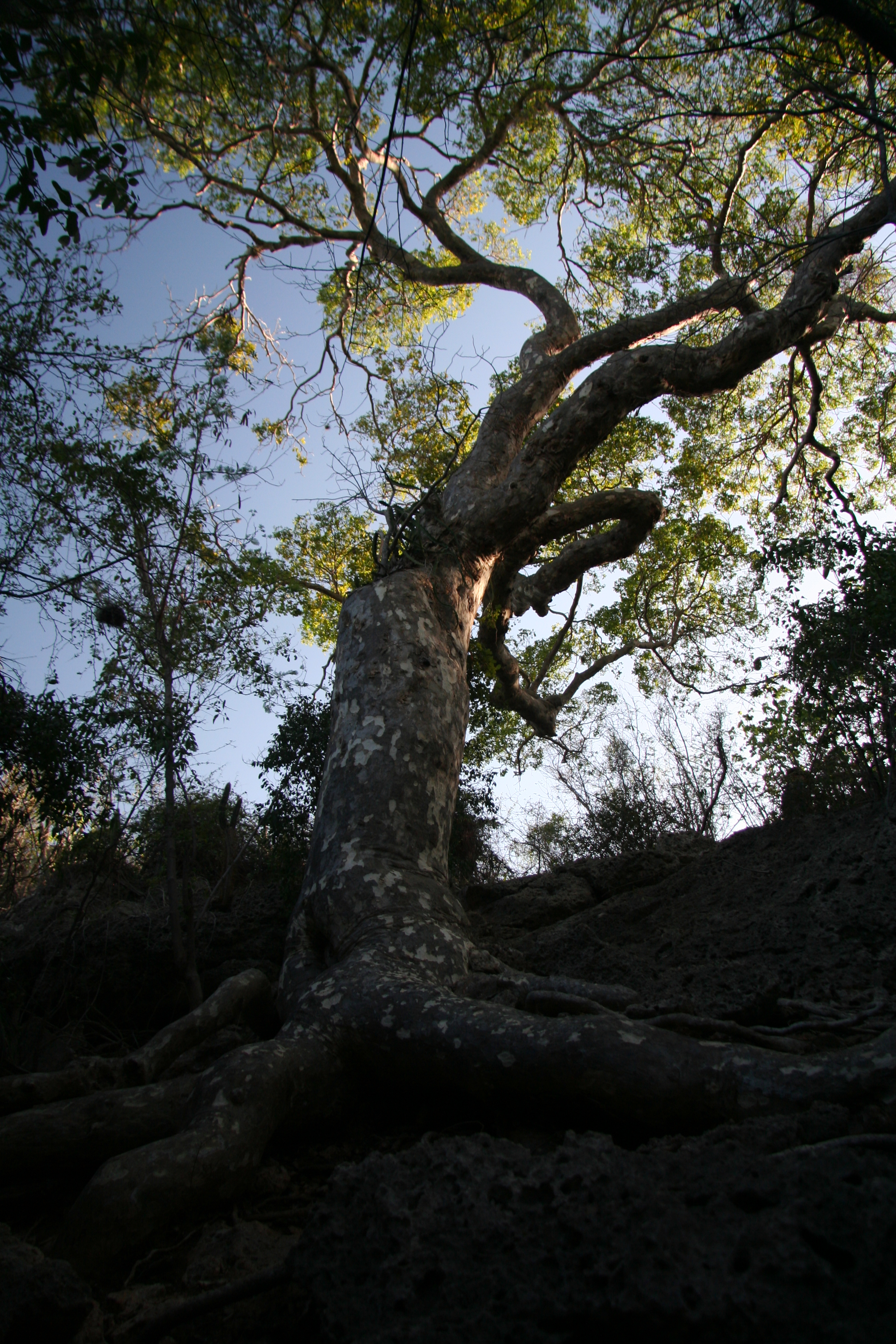
Guayacán Centenario

Guánica has mountains and a dry forest. The Guánica State Forest (Bosque Estatal de Guánica) is also the name of a dry forest reserve east and west of the town, the largest remaining tract of tropical dry coastal forest in the world and designated an international Biosphere Reserve in 1981. The park comprising much of the dry forest is known as Bosque Seco de Guánica.

Highway Route 116, the nearest principal road, heads west toward Lajas and east toward Ponce, passing through the island of Puerto Rico's driest area. The largely intact forest of the Guánica Dry Forest reserve hosts the greatest number of bird species found on the island, including several bird species seldom found anywhere else: the Puerto Rican lizard cuckoo, Puerto Rican woodpecker, the Puerto Rican nightjar, and the Puerto Rican emerald hummingbird. Other animals thought to be extinct in Puerto Rico have turned up in this forest. Many different types of cacti grow here, a stunning contrast to the lush Caribbean National Forest in the northeast part of the island, which is a tropical rainforest. The contrast is due to the mountain ridge Cordillera Central which separates Guánica from the northeast part of the island; while the northeast receives over 100 inches (2,500 mm) of precipitation each year, Guánica receives less than 30, and some regions of the forest reserve are said to receive only six inches.

The forest reserve of some 9,500 acres (38 km^{2}) contains 36 miles (58 km) of trails through four different forest types: deciduous trees, a coastal region with tree-size milkweed and nine-foot-tall (2.7 m) prickly pear cactus, a mahogany forest, and twisted gumbo limbo trees. There are about 700 varieties of plants, including aroma (acacia) and guayacan (Lignum vitae—Latin for 'wood of life'). One guayacan is about 500–700 years old. The squat melon cactus and other cacti can be found here along with 40 species of birds, including the guabairo (Puerto Rican nightjar), found nowhere else. Also found in the area are the Puerto Rico crested toad (Peltophryne lemur) and, sometimes on the beaches, green and leatherback turtles, though their eggs suffer severe predation from mongooses one time introduced to fight rats in sugarcane fields.

=== Barrios ===
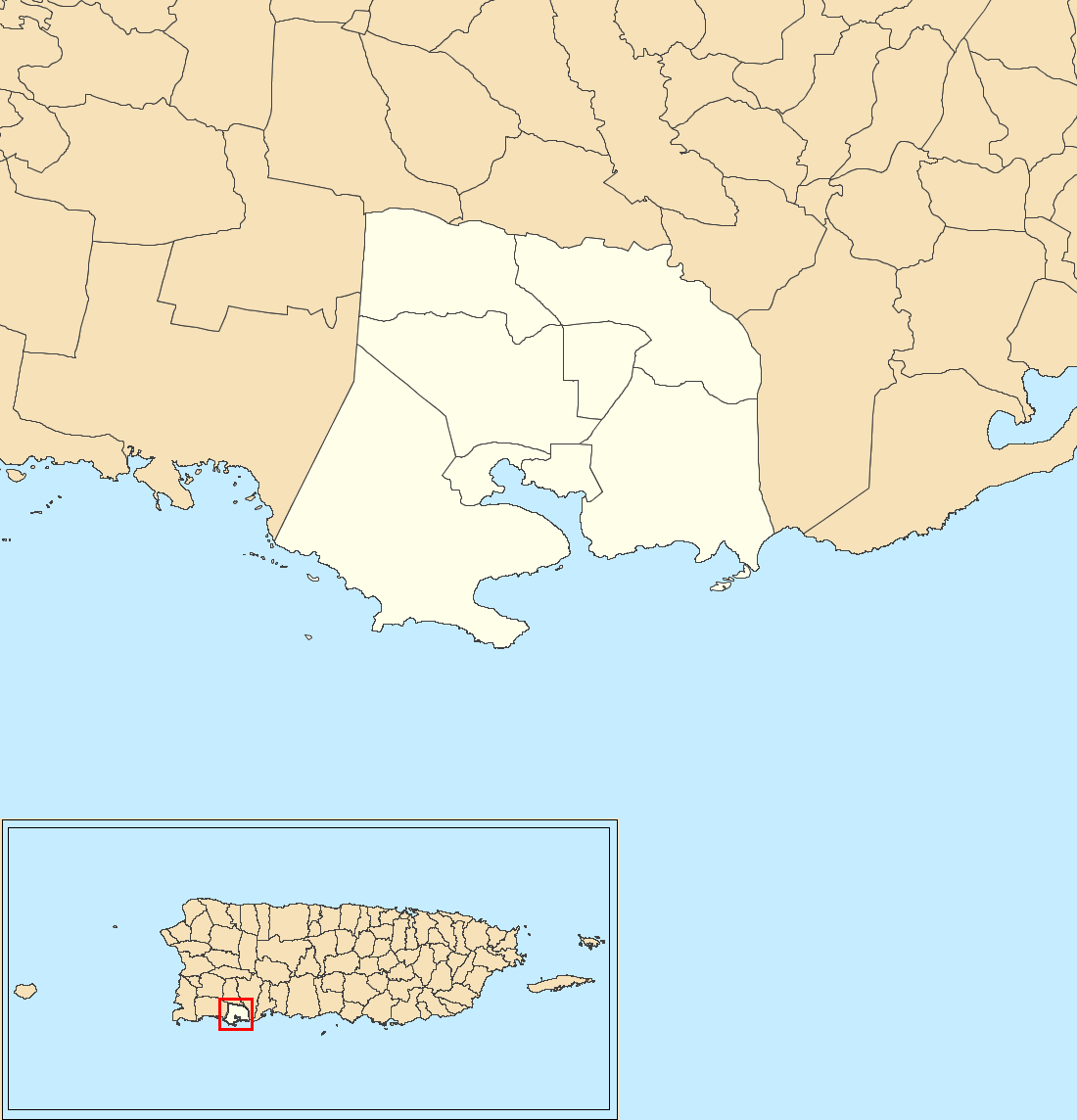
Subdivisions of Guánica

Like all municipalities of Puerto Rico, Guánica is subdivided into barrios. The municipal buildings, central square and large Catholic church are located in a small barrio referred to as "el pueblo".

1. Arena
2. Caño
3. Carenero
4. Ciénaga
5. Ensenada
6. Guánica barrio-pueblo
7. Montalva
8. Susúa Baja

=== Sectors ===
Barrios (which are, in contemporary times, roughly comparable to minor civil divisions) and subbarrios, are further subdivided into smaller areas called sectores (sectors in English). The types of sectores may vary, from normally sector to urbanización to reparto to barriada to residencial, among others.

=== Special Communities ===
Comunidades Especiales de Puerto Rico (Special Communities of Puerto Rico) are marginalized communities whose citizens are experiencing a certain amount of social exclusion. A map shows these communities occur in nearly every municipality of the commonwealth. Of the 742 places that were on the list in 2014, the following barrios, communities, sectors, or neighborhoods were in Guánica: Esperanza neighborhood, Callejón Magüeyes, El Batey, El Tumbao, Ensenada, Fuig, La Luna, and Playa Santa.

== Tourism ==
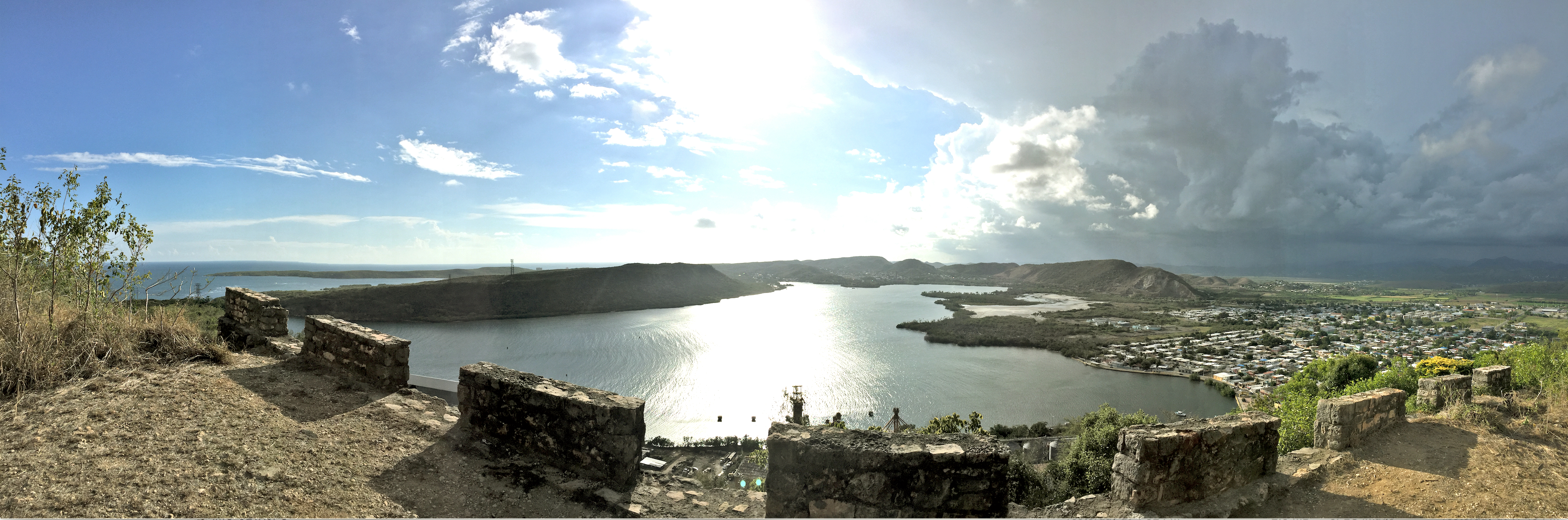

To stimulate local tourism, the Puerto Rico Tourism Company launched the Voy Turistiendo ("I'm Touring") campaign, with a passport book and website. The Guánica page lists Bosque Seco de Guánica, Playa La Jungla, and Cayo Aurora "Gilligan's", as places of interest.

=== Landmarks and places of interest ===
According to a news article by Primera Hora, Guánica has 39 beaches, including Playa Santa.

- Guánica Parador 1929 is a historic inn near the sugar mill
- Museum of Art and History of Guánica (former town hall)
- Azul Beach
- Ballenas Bay
- Ballenas Beach (is considered a dangerous beach)
- Caprón Fortress
- Casa Alejada
- Cayo Aurora (popularly known as Gilligan's Island)
- Copamarina Beach Resort & Spa
- El Malecón (Boardwalk)
- Guánica Bay
- Playa Manglillo is a beach near Playa Santa.
- Playa Santa Beach
- Punta de Brea, a surf spot
- Punta Jorobao
- Hacienda Santa Rita
- Serra Beach
- Central Guánica (Sugar Cane Refinery)
- Guánica State Forest, also called Guánica Dry Forest is a 9,000-acre forest
- Guánica Lighthouse ruins

== Economy ==
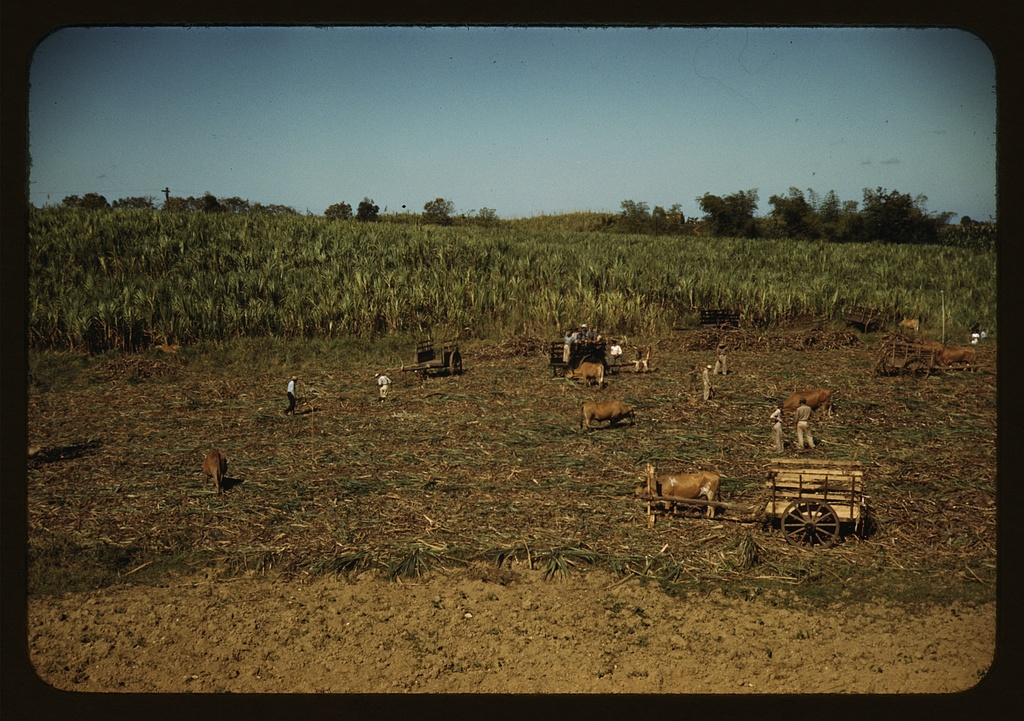
Harvesting sugarcane in Guánica in 1942

=== Agriculture ===
- Salt and Sugarcane

=== Industry ===
- Manufacture (apparel)

== Culture ==
=== Festivals and events ===
Guánica celebrates its patron saint festival in July. The Fiestas Patronales de Santiago Apostol is a religious and cultural celebration that generally features parades, games, artisans, amusement rides, regional food, and live entertainment. The festival has featured live performances by well-known artists such as Cano Estremera, Tito Rojas, and Arcángel.

Other festivals and events celebrated in Guánica include:

- Fish Festival – April
- July 25 Parade – July
- Juan Ponce de León Celebration – August

== Demographics ==
Historical population
Census	Pop.	Note	%±
1920	9,948		—
1930	10,238		2.9%
1940	12,685		23.9%
1950	15,630		23.2%
1960	13,767		−11.9%
1970	14,889		8.1%
1980	18,799		26.3%
1990	19,984		6.3%
2000	21,888		9.5%
2010	19,427		−11.2%
2020	13,787		−29.0%
2025 (est.)	11,840	▼	−14.1%
U.S. Decennial Census; 1920-1930; 1930-1950 1960-2000 2010 2020

== Government ==
Like all municipalities in Puerto Rico, Guánica is administered by a mayor. The current mayor is Ismael (Titi) Rodríguez Ramos, from the Popular Democratic Party (PPD). Rodríguez was first elected in the 2020 general election after a close race with Santos Seda (Papichy) from the New Progressive Party (PNP). While both candidates received almost the same share of the vote, 2,000 ballots where write in votes mostly for Edgardo Cruz Vélez an independent candidate. This resulted in a vote recount and while the initial results signaled Vélez was the victor, after weeks of counting, Rodríguez was declared the winner. Vélez initially conceded the race but then petitioned a court to adjudge early voting ballots to his count. This court case and subsequent court appeal where both dismissed.

The city belongs to the Puerto Rico Senatorial district V, which is represented by two Senators. In 2024, Marially González Huertas and Jamie Barlucea, from the Popular Democratic Party and New Progressive Party, respectively, were elected as District Senators.

== Symbols ==
The municipio has an official flag and coat of arms.

=== Flag ===
The five waves, blue and yellow represent the Guánica Bay, a fragment of the Official Shield of Guánica.

=== Coat of arms ===
Shield divided in four quarters. In the superior right side, it has a "bohío" (a native hut) under a crown that represents Cacique Agüeybaná, whose yucayeque (Indian territory) was in this region. In the superior left quarter, a lion representing Juan Ponce de León. The red and yellow checkered strips over a silver-plated background in the inferior right side represent the shields of Don Cristóbal de Sotomayor, founder of the town of Tavara, the actual location of Guánica. The waved stripes represent the bay of this town. The branches surrounding the shield represent the sugarcane industry that was very important in this region.

== Notable "Guaniqueños" ==
- Agüeybaná and Agüeybaná II, Taíno chiefs
- Rose Franco (b. 1932), first Puerto Rican woman Chief Warrant Officer in U.S. Marine Corps

== Transportation ==
At one time during 1937, Guánica received domestic, commercial airline flights from San Juan on Puerto Rico's national airline, Puertorriqueña de Aviación.

There are 25 bridges in Guánica.

== Gallery ==
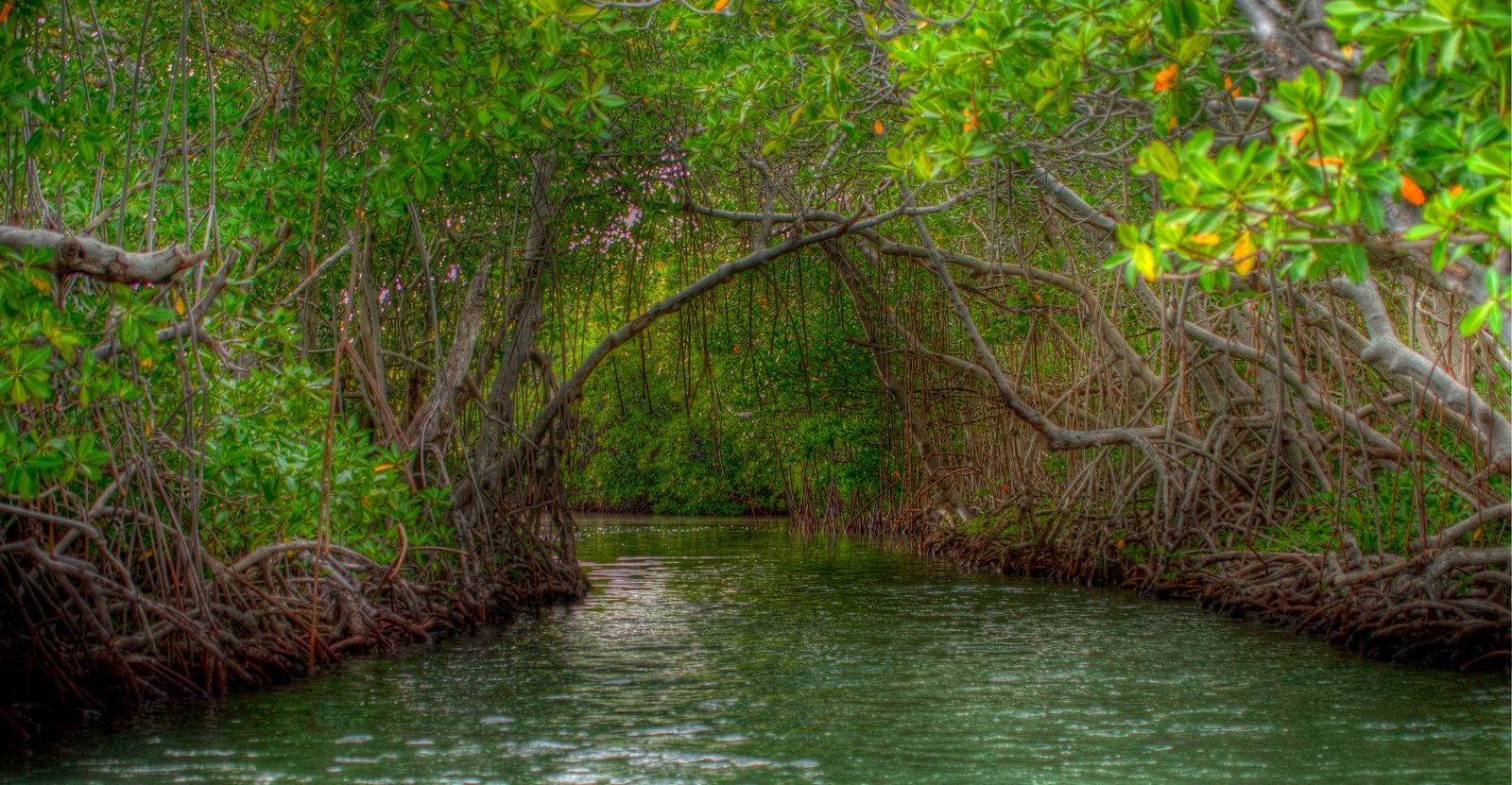
Guánica mangroves

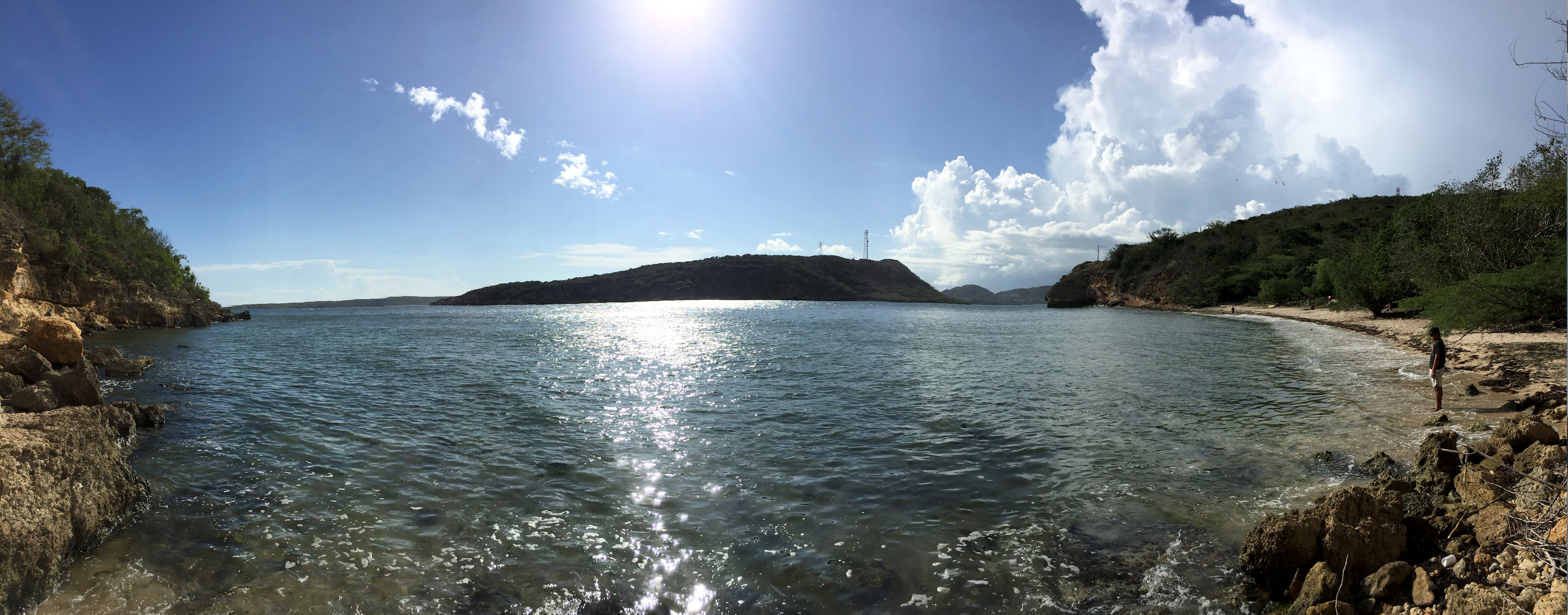
Playa Jaboncillo

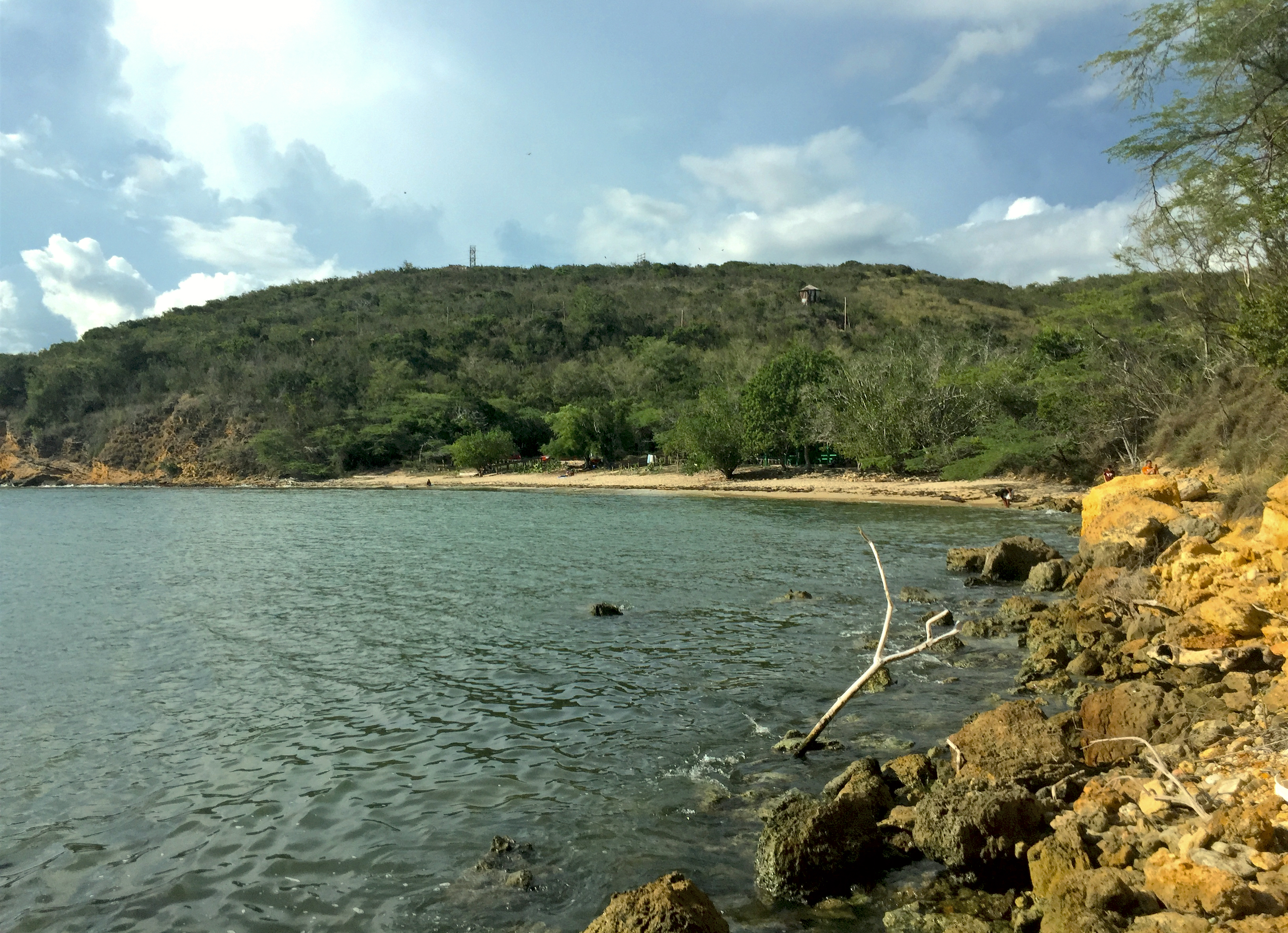
Playa Jaboncillo and Bosque Seco in Guánica

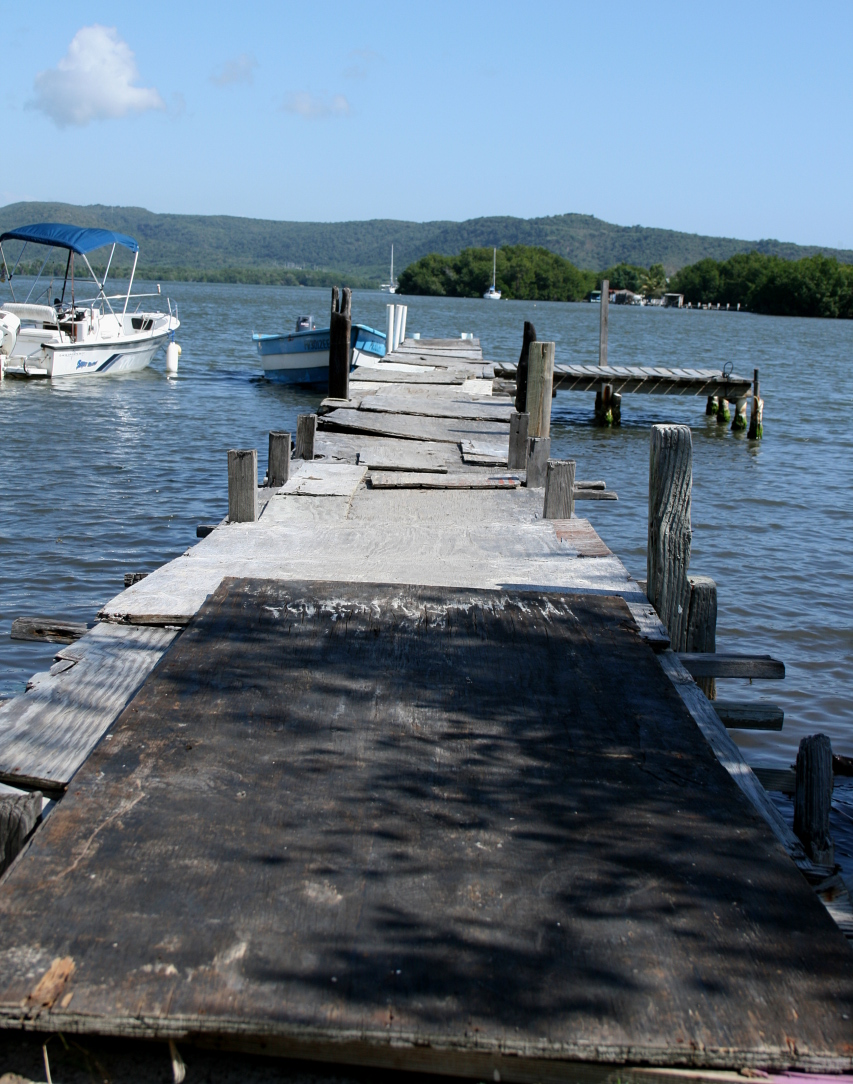
Pier in Guánica

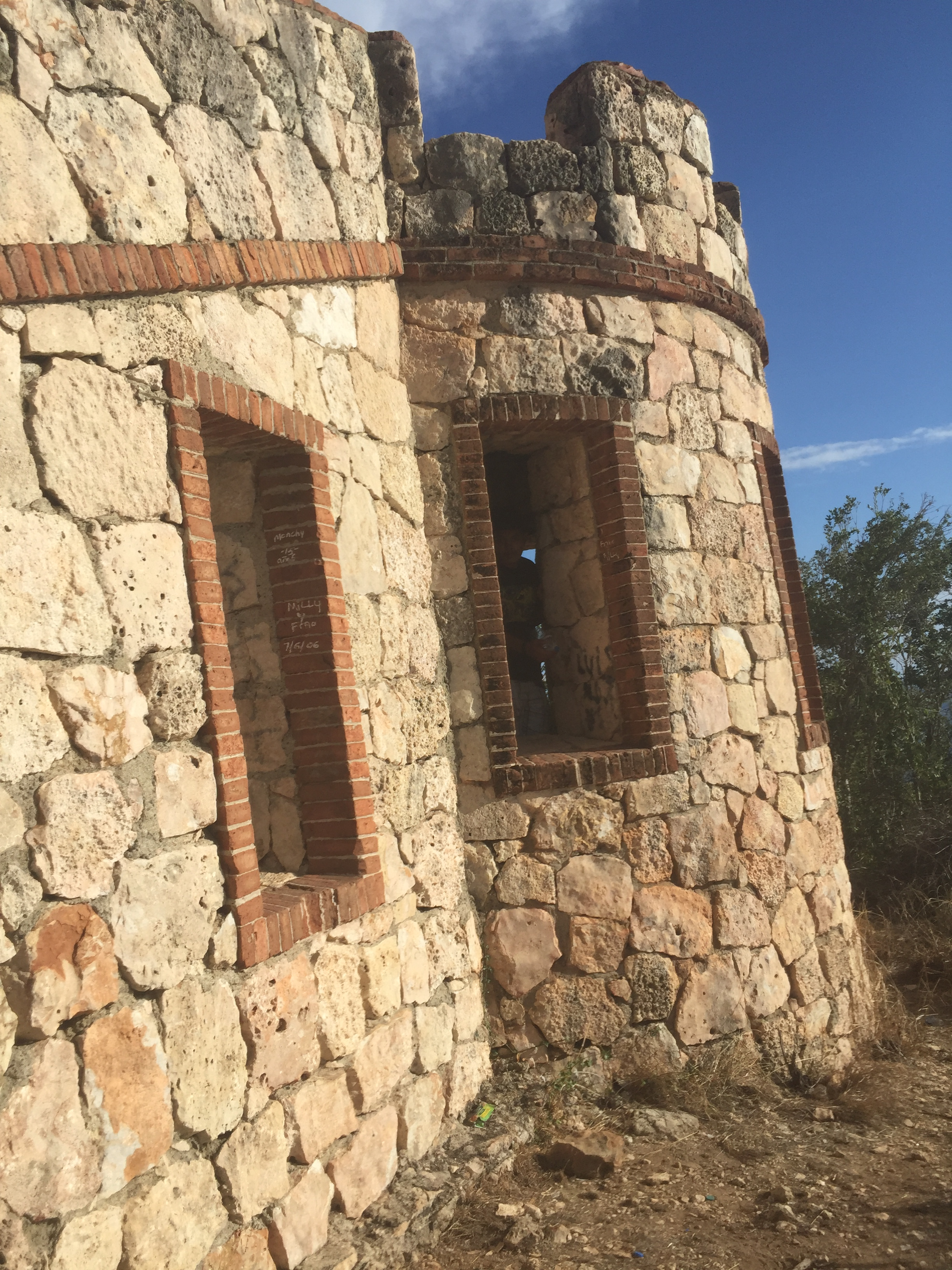
Fuerte Capron, Bosque Seco, Guánica

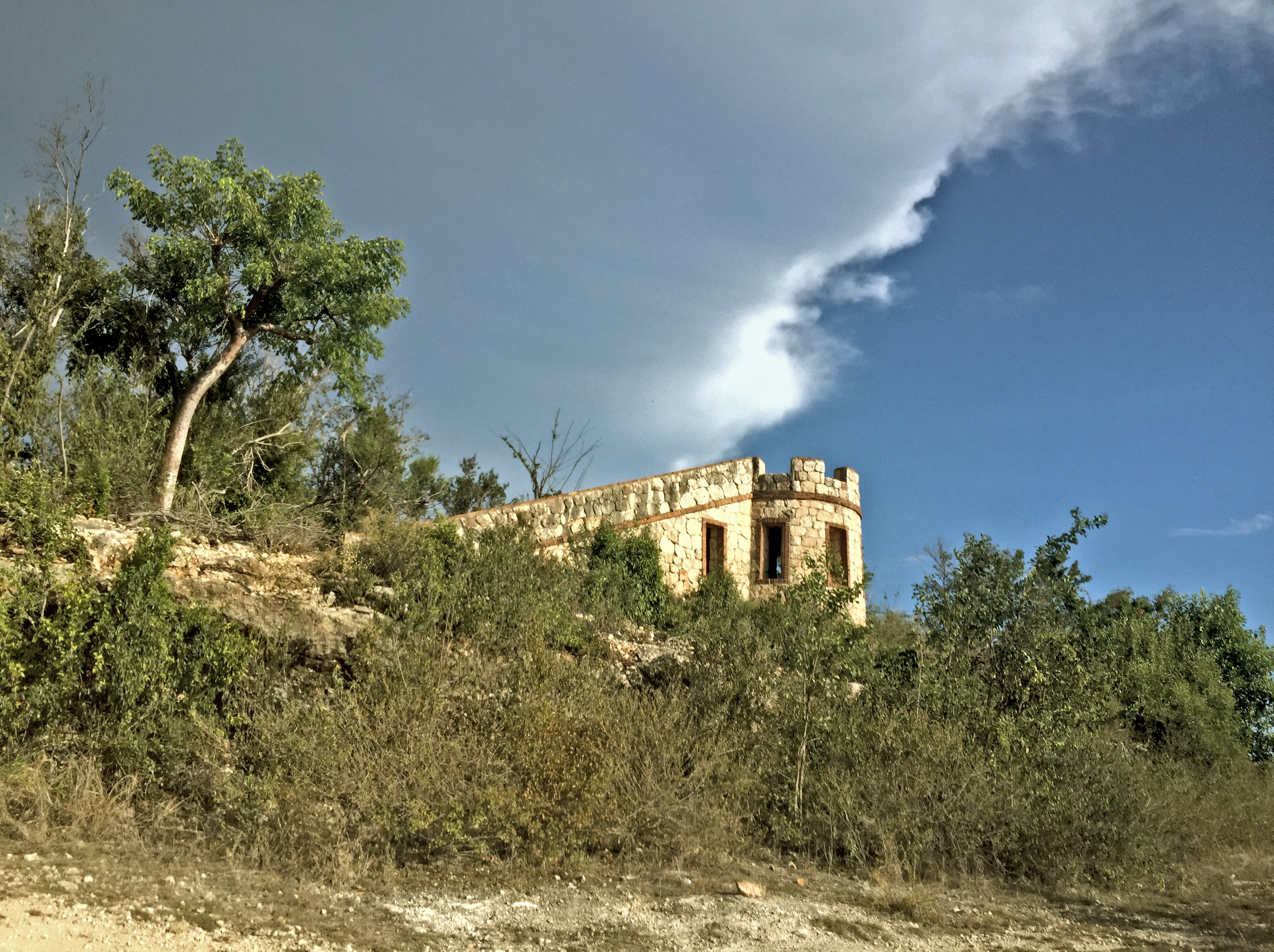
Fuerte Capron, Bosque Seco, Guánica

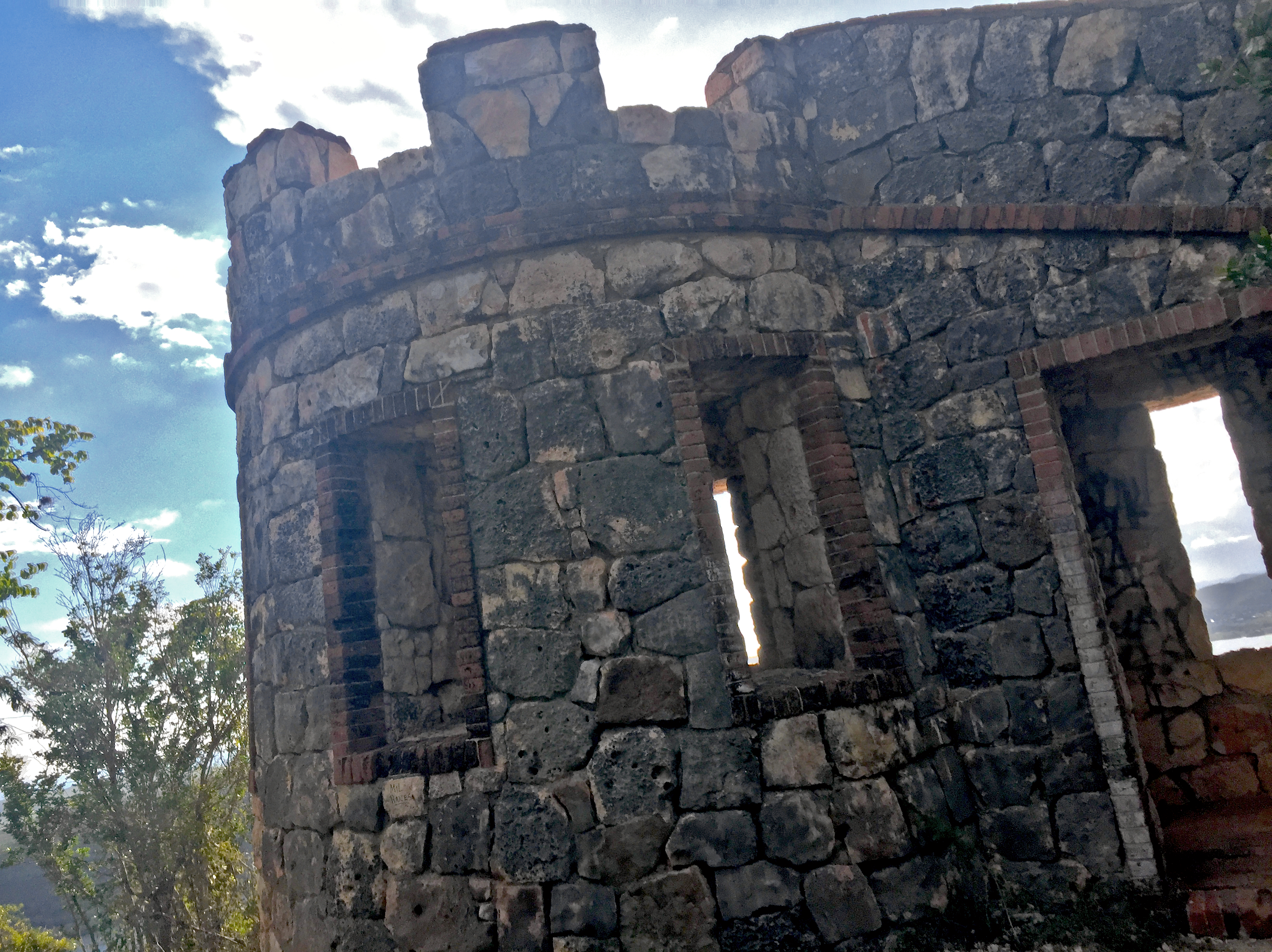
Facade of Fuerte Capron

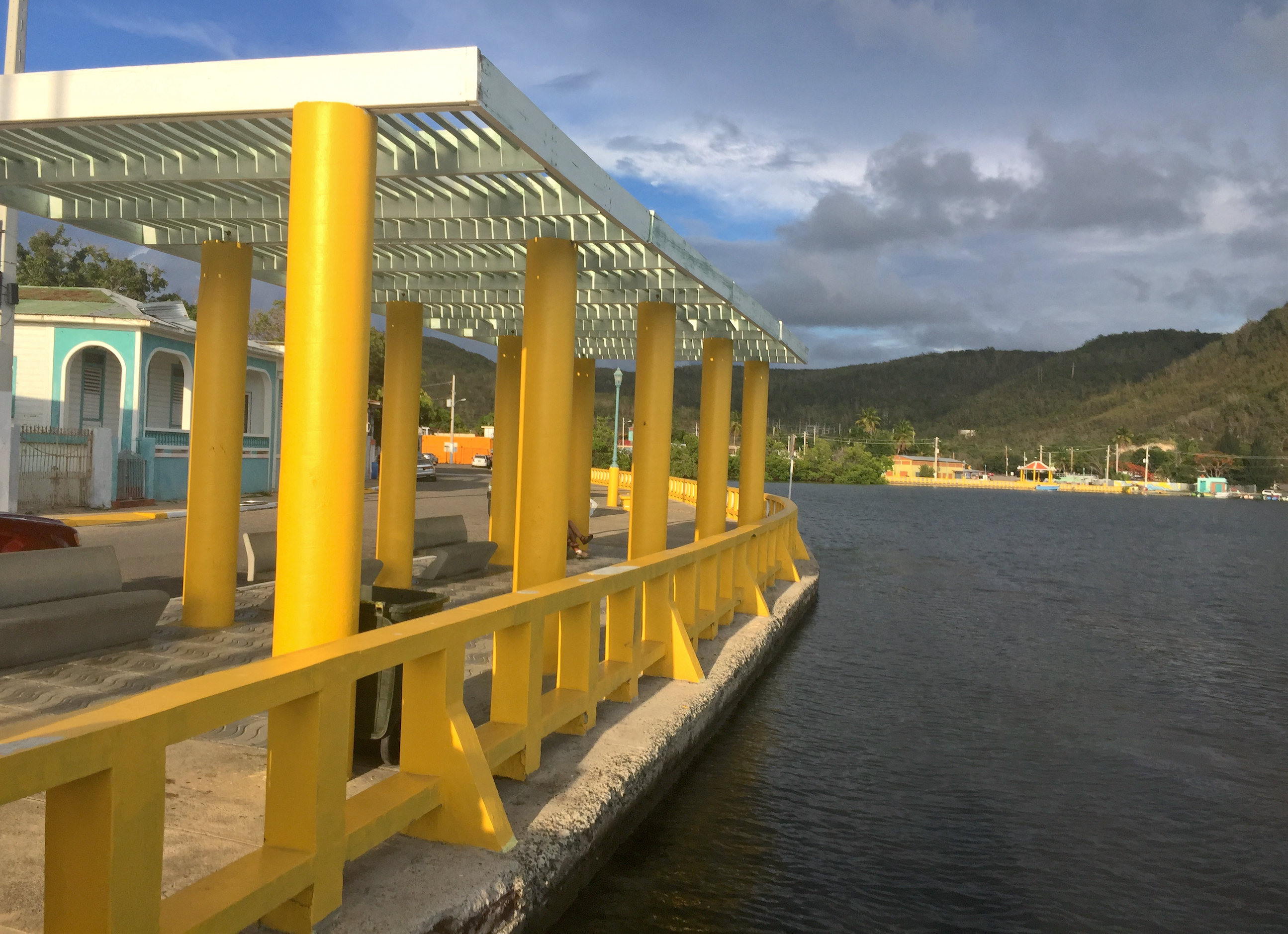
Guánica boardwalk

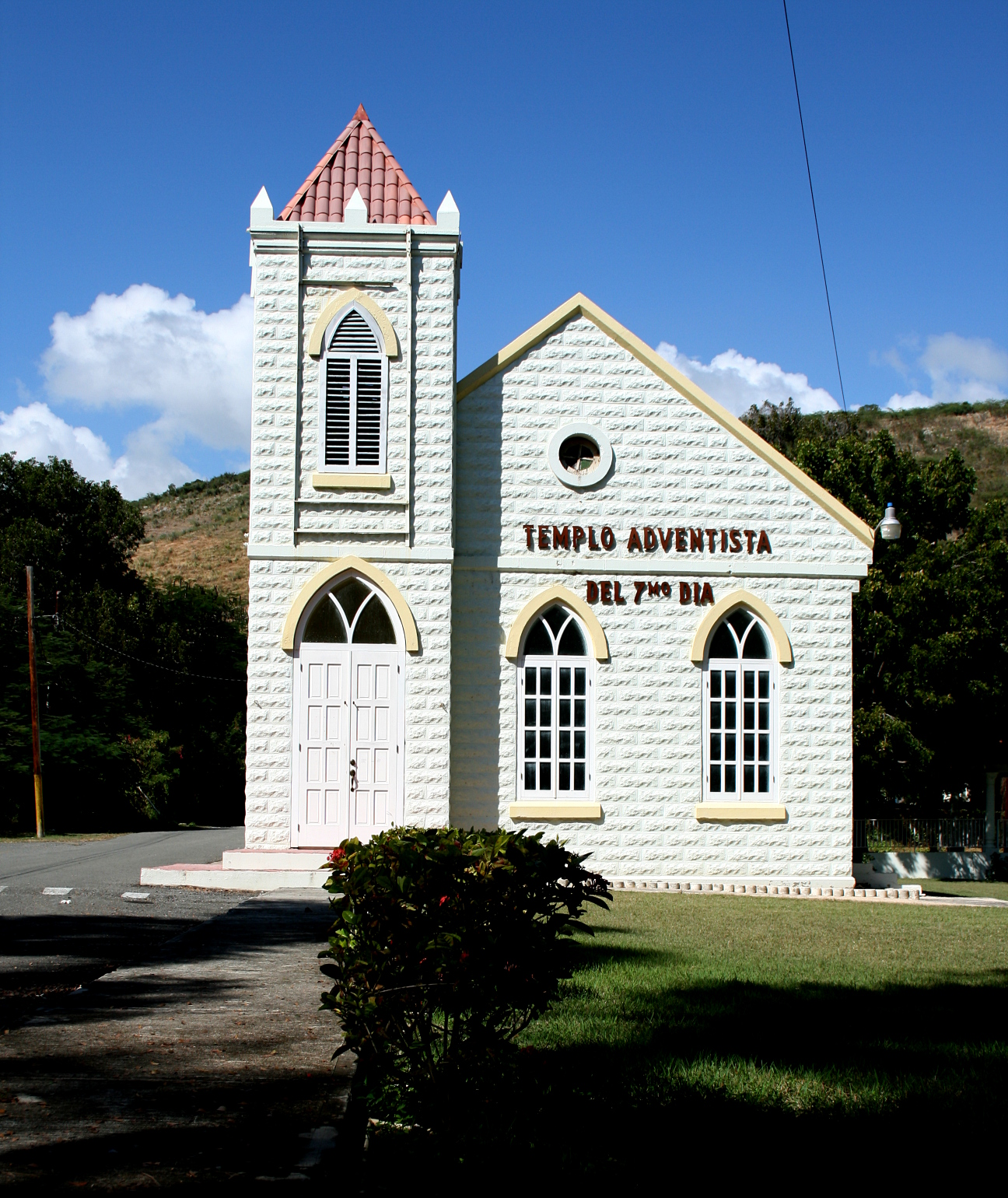
Adventist Temple in Guánica

== Books ==
- Torres, Angel Luis, Walter Torres, and Miguel Canals. En el Bosque Seco de Guánica. San Juan, Puerto Rico: La Editorial Universidad de Puerto Rico (Colección San Pedrito), 1995. ISBN 0-8477-0207-3 – Children's picture book about a trip through the dry forest of Guánica with a sea turtle. (in Spanish)

== See also ==
- List of Puerto Ricans
- History of Puerto Rico
- National Register of Historic Places listings in Guánica, Puerto Rico
- Did you know-Puerto Rico?
