= Guánica barrio-pueblo =

Historical and administrative center (seat) of Guánica, Puerto Rico

Guánica barrio-pueblo Pueblo de Guánica
- Municipality Seat
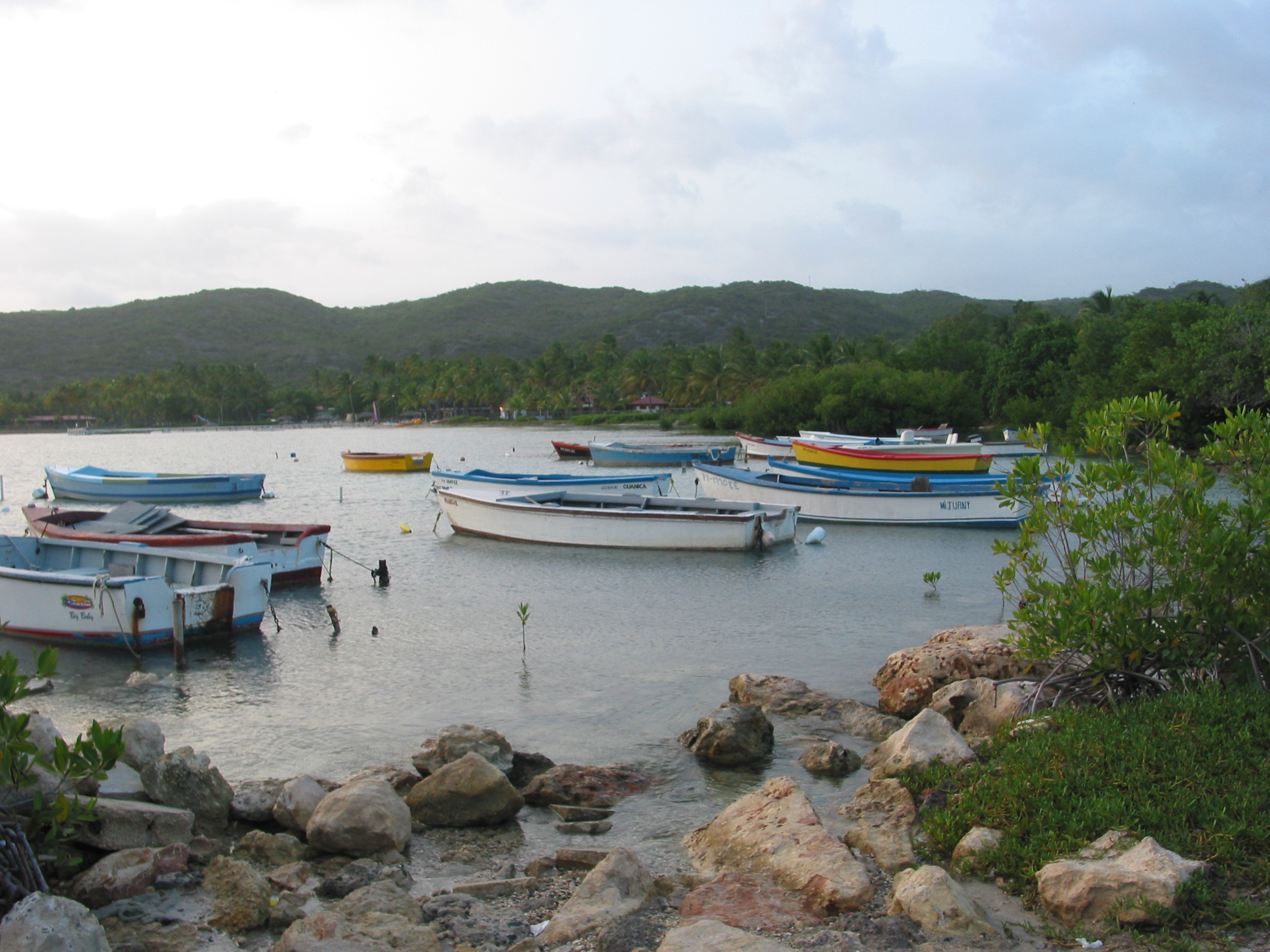
- Boats in the San Jacinto Sector of Guánica barrio-pueblo

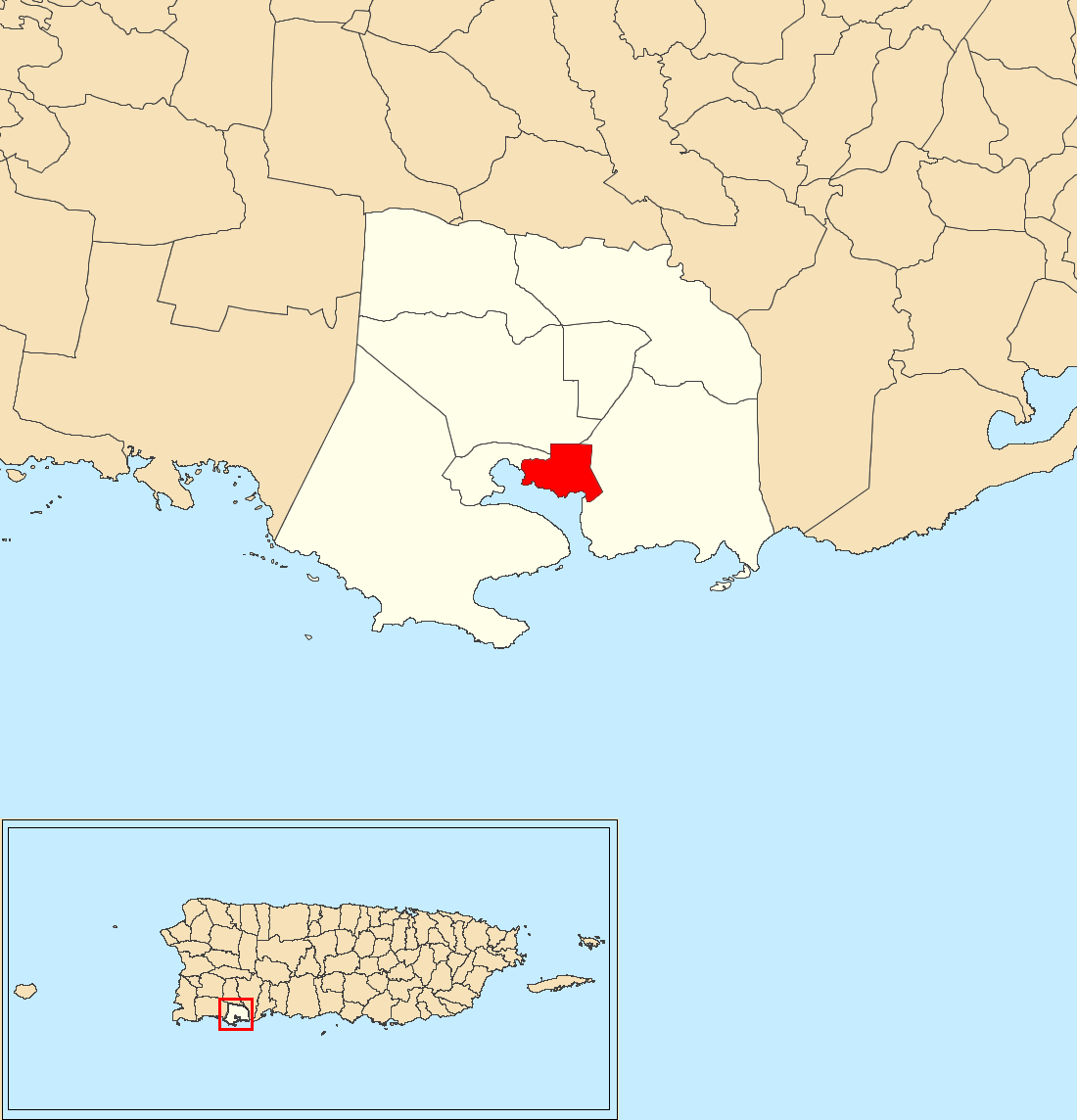
- Location of Guánica barrio-pueblo within the municipality of Guánica shown in red

- Location of Puerto Rico
- Coordinates: 17°58′07″N 66°54′52″W
- Commonwealth: Puerto Rico
- Municipality: Guánica

Area
  - Total: 0.98 sq mi (2.5 km^{2})
  - Land: 0.78 sq mi (2.0 km^{2})
  - Water: 0.20 sq mi (0.52 km^{2})
- Elevation: 10 ft (3.0 m)

Population (2010)
  - Total: 3,514
  - Density: 4,505.1/sq mi (1,739.4/km^{2})
- Source: 2010 Census
- Time zone: UTC−4 (AST)
- ZIP Code: 00653

Guánica barrio-pueblo is a barrio and the administrative center (seat) of Guánica, a municipality of Puerto Rico. Its population in 2010 was 3,514.

As was customary in Spain, in Puerto Rico, the municipality has a barrio called pueblo which contains a central plaza, the municipal buildings (city hall), and a Catholic church. Fiestas patronales (patron saint festivals) are held in the central plaza every year.

Historical population
Census	Pop.	Note	%±
1900	1,363		—
1910	1,768		29.7%
1920	2,103		18.9%
1930	2,542		20.9%
1940	3,636		43.0%
1950	4,833		32.9%
1960	4,100		−15.2%
1970	0		−100.0%
1980	5,323		—
1990	4,869		−8.5%
2000	4,699		−3.5%
2010	3,514		−25.2%
U.S. Decennial Census; 1899 (shown as 1900) 1910-1930; 1930-1950 1980-2000 2010

== The central plaza and its church ==
The central plaza, or square, is a place in barrio-pueblo for official and unofficial recreational events and a place where people can gather and socialize from dusk to dawn. The Laws of the Indies, Spanish law, which regulated life in Puerto Rico in the early 19th century, stated the plaza's purpose was for "the parties" (celebrations, festivities) (Spanish: a propósito para las fiestas), and that the square should be proportionally large enough for the number of neighbors (Spanish: grandeza proporcionada al número de vecinos). These Spanish regulations also stated that the streets nearby should be comfortable portals for passersby, protecting them from the elements: sun and rain.

Located across the central plaza in Guánica barrio-pueblo is the Parroquia San Antonio Abad, a Roman Catholic church.

== Gallery ==
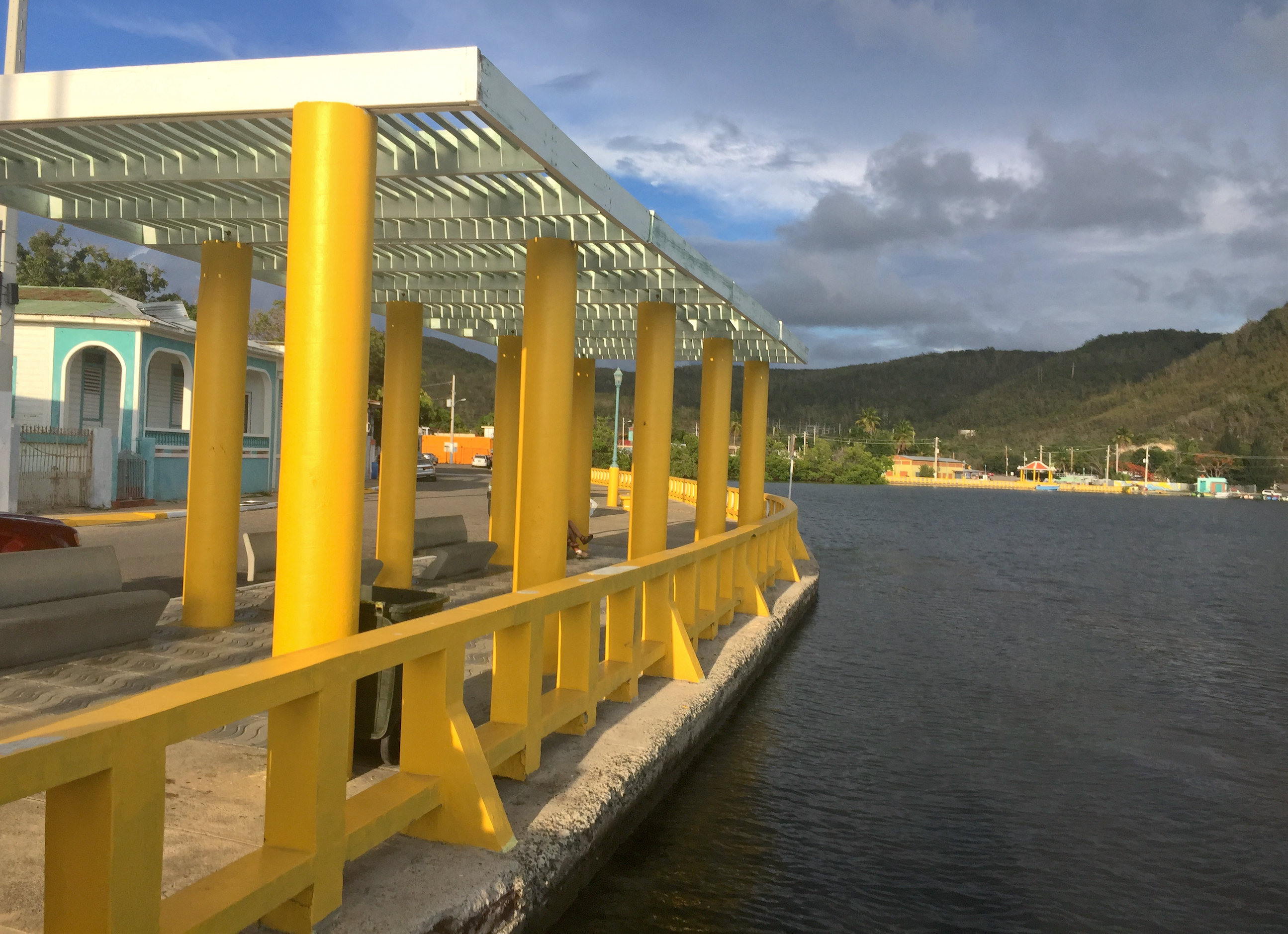
Boardwalk in Guánica barrio-pueblo

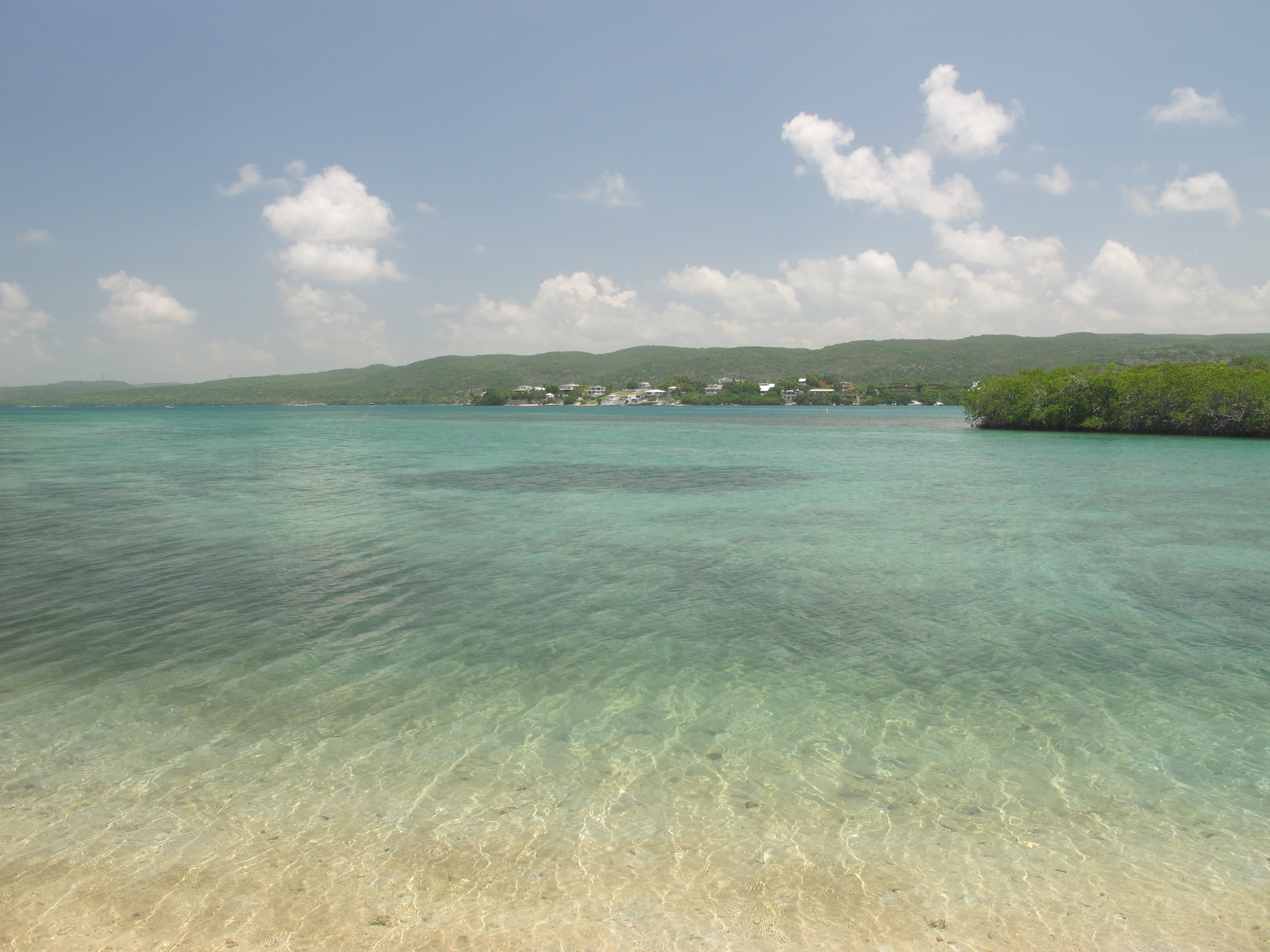
Sector San Jacinto seen from Cayo Aurora

== See also ==
- List of communities in Puerto Rico
