= Arena, Guánica, Puerto Rico =

Barrio of Puerto Rico

Arena
- Barrio
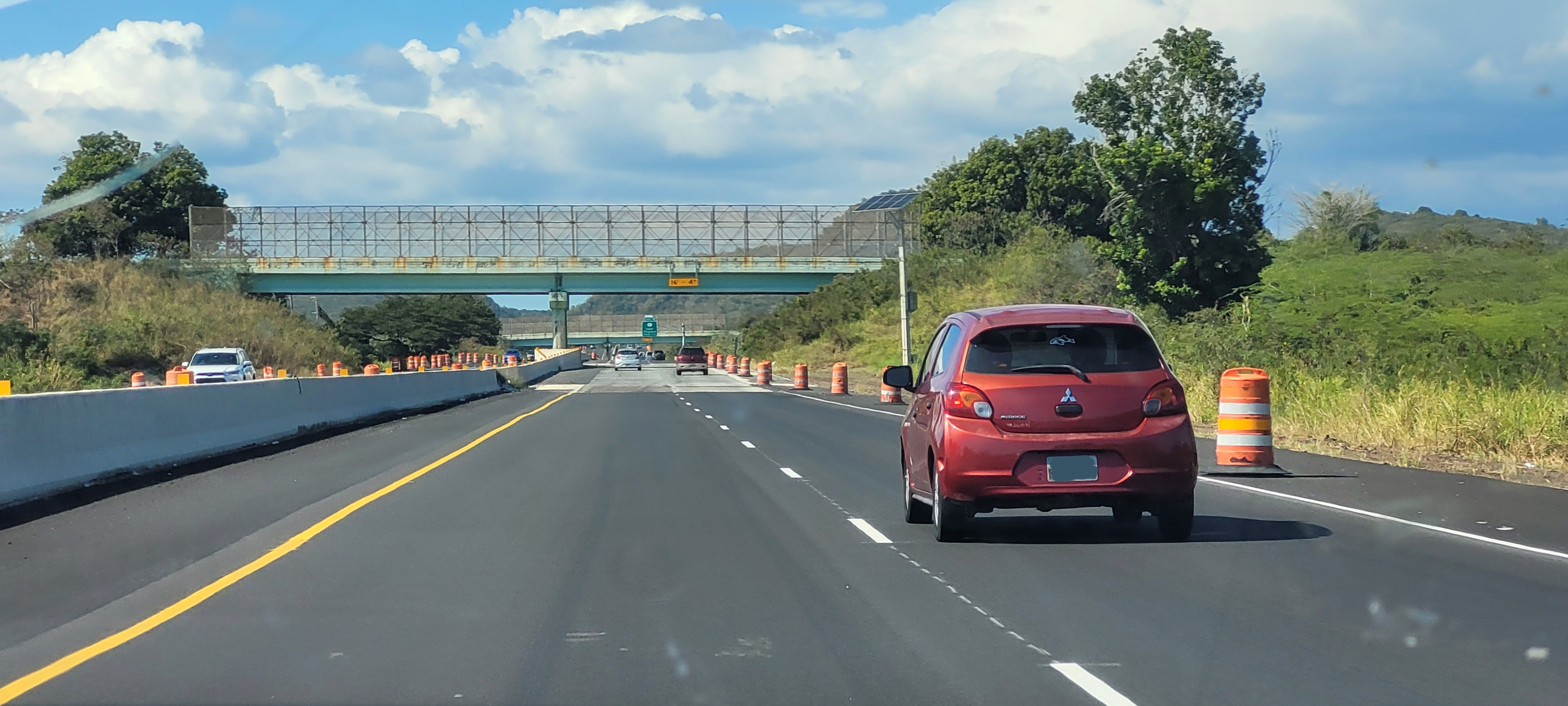
- Puerto Rico Highway 2 between Arena and Susúa

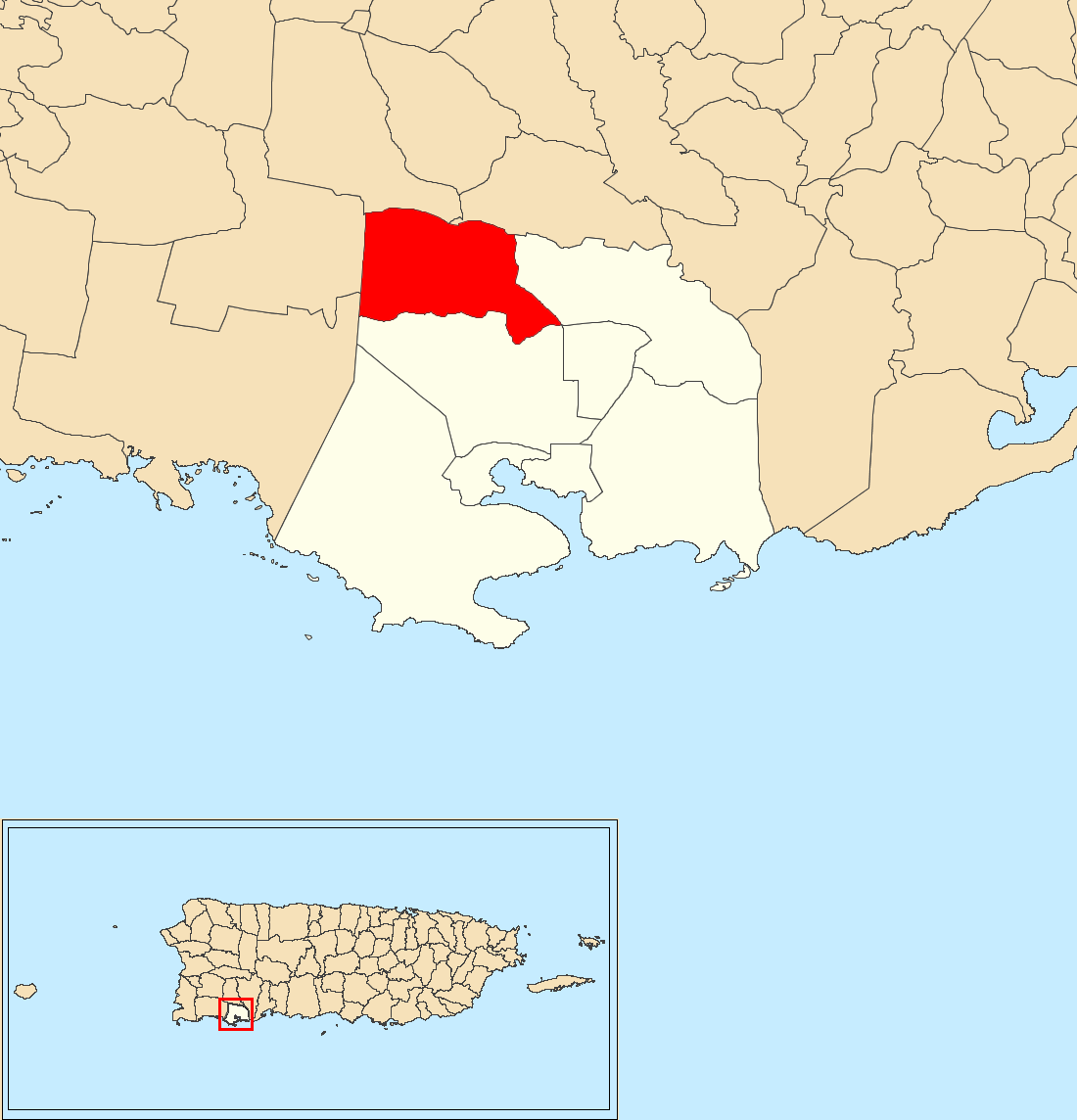
- Location of Arena within the municipality of Guánica shown in red

- Location of Puerto Rico
- Coordinates: 18°01′02″N 66°56′36″W
- Commonwealth: Puerto Rico
- Municipality: Guánica

Area
  - Total: 4.38 sq mi (11.3 km^{2})
  - Land: 4.38 sq mi (11.3 km^{2})
  - Water: 0 sq mi (0 km^{2})
- Elevation: 33 ft (10 m)

Population (2010)
  - Total: 96
  - Density: 21.9/sq mi (8.5/km^{2})
- Source: 2010 Census
- Time zone: UTC−4 (AST)
- ZIP Code: 00653

Arena is a barrio in the municipality of Guánica, Puerto Rico. Its population in 2010 was 96.

Historical population
Census	Pop.	Note	%±
1940	590		—
1950	368		−37.6%
1960	162		−56.0%
1970	73		−54.9%
1980	100		37.0%
1990	323		223.0%
2000	84		−74.0%
2010	96		14.3%
U.S. Decennial Census; 1899 (shown as 1900) 1910-1930; 1930-1950 1980-2000 2010

== See also ==
- List of communities in Puerto Rico
