= Carenero =

Barrio of Guánica, Puerto Rico

- Barrio
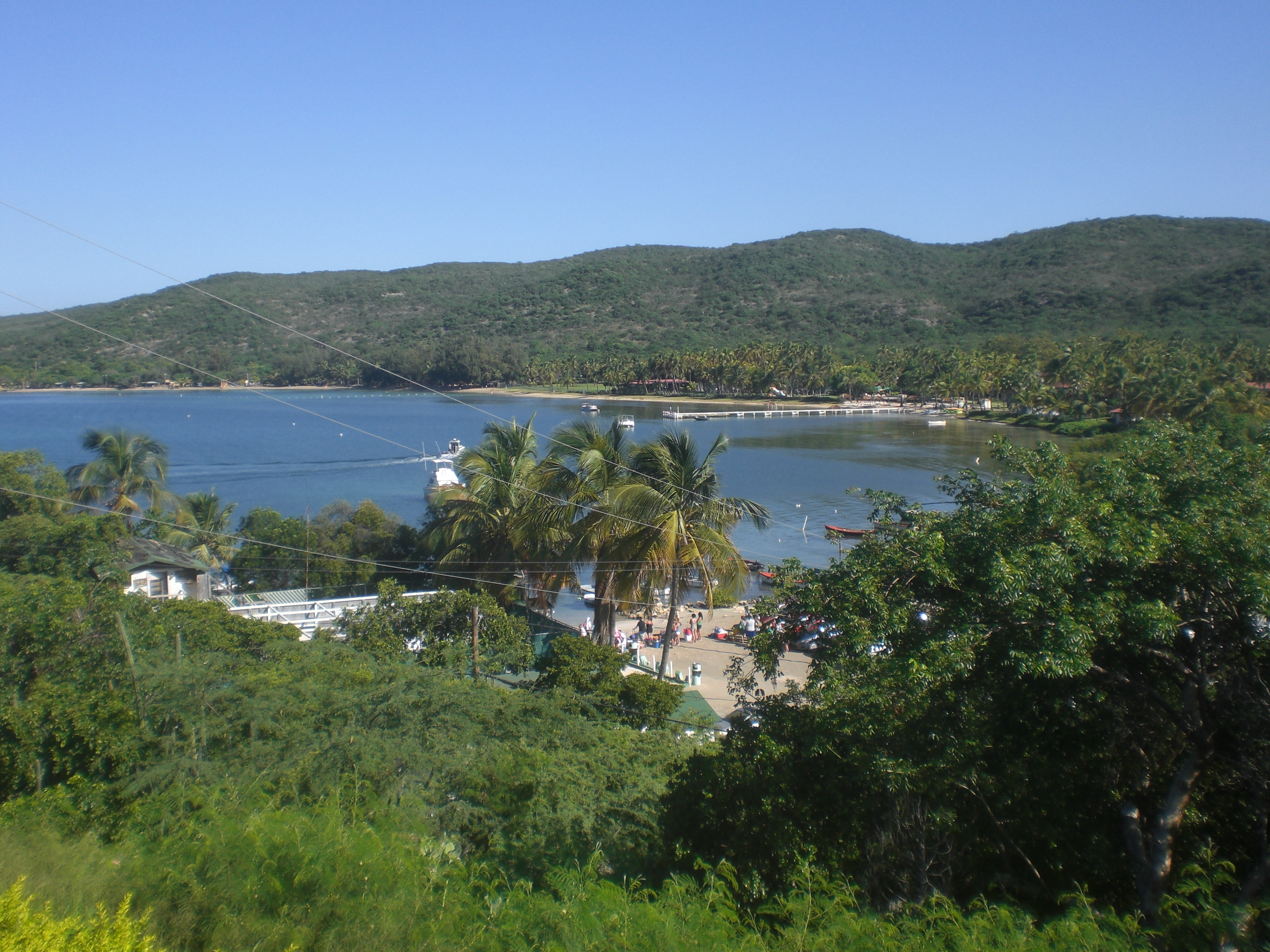
- View of Caña Gorda sector in Carenero

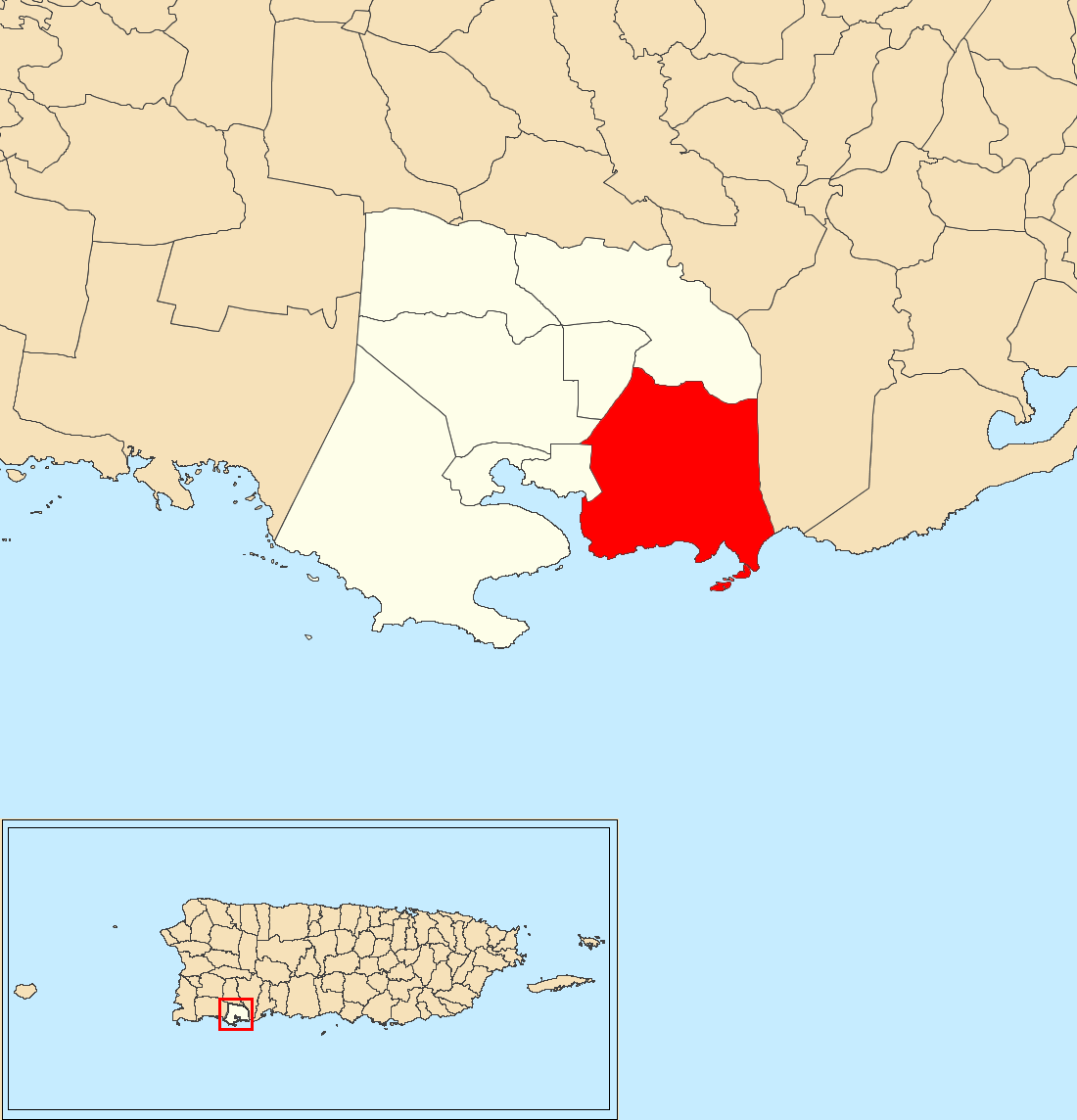
- Location of Carenero within the municipality of Guánica shown in red

- Location of Puerto Rico
- Coordinates: 17°57′33″N 66°53′09″W
- Commonwealth: Puerto Rico
- Municipality: Guánica

Area
  - Total: 9.18 sq mi (23.8 km^{2})
  - Land: 7.39 sq mi (19.1 km^{2})
  - Water: 1.79 sq mi (4.6 km^{2})
- Elevation: 495 ft (151 m)

Population (2010)
  - Total: 2,670
  - Density: 361.3/sq mi (139.5/km^{2})
- Source: 2010 Census
- Time zone: UTC−4 (AST)
- ZIP Code: 00653

Carenero is a barrio in the municipality of Guánica, Puerto Rico. Its population in 2010 was 2,670.

Historical population
Census	Pop.	Note	%±
1930	566		—
1940	274		−51.6%
1950	482		75.9%
1960	1,277		164.9%
1970	903		−29.3%
1980	1,896		110.0%
1990	2,158		13.8%
2000	2,862		32.6%
2010	2,670		−6.7%
U.S. Decennial Census; 1899 (shown as 1900) 1910-1930; 1930-1950 1980-2000 2010

== Features ==
The Guánica State Forest is partly located in Carenero.

== Gallery ==
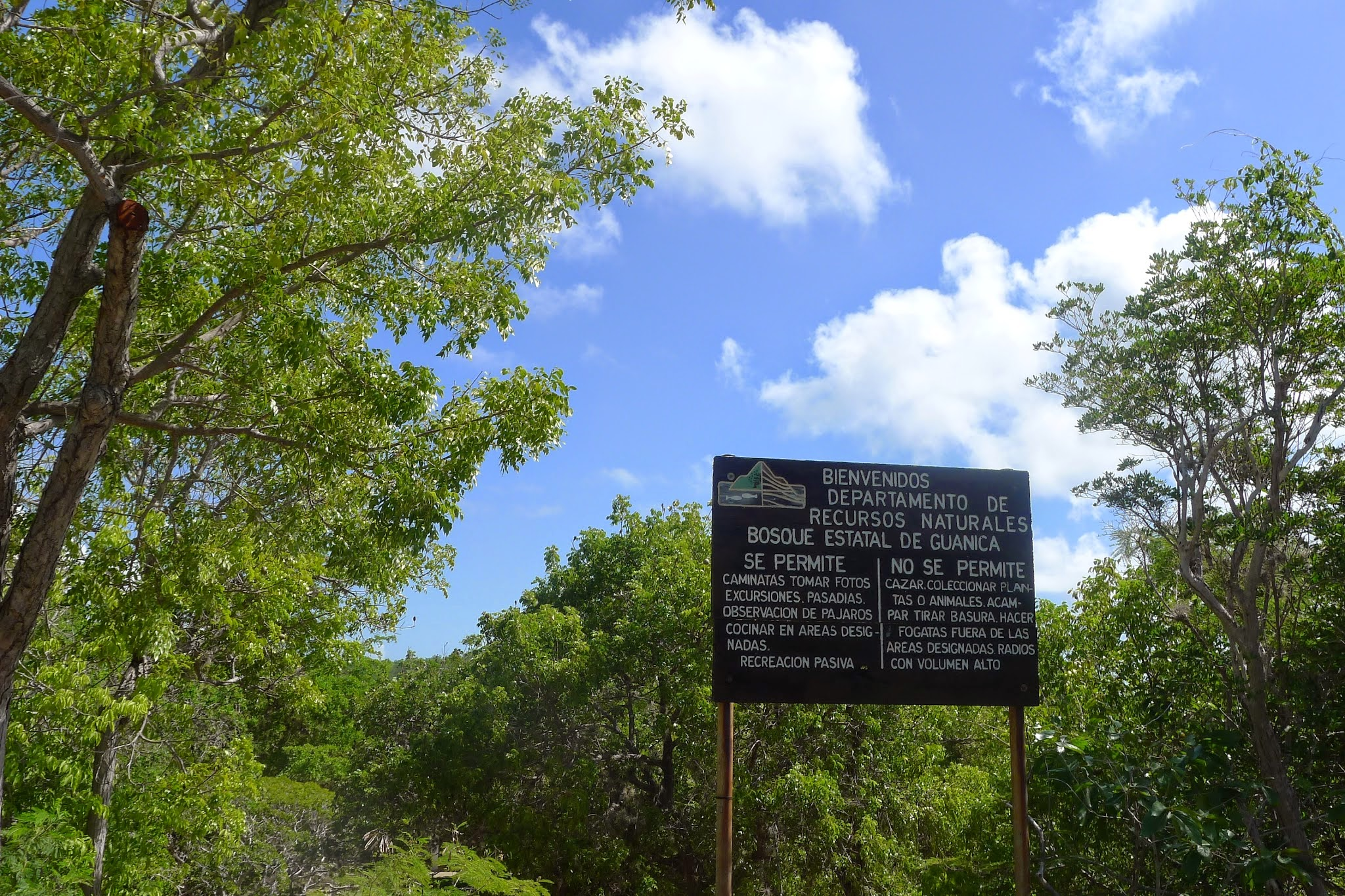
Welcome to the forest sign

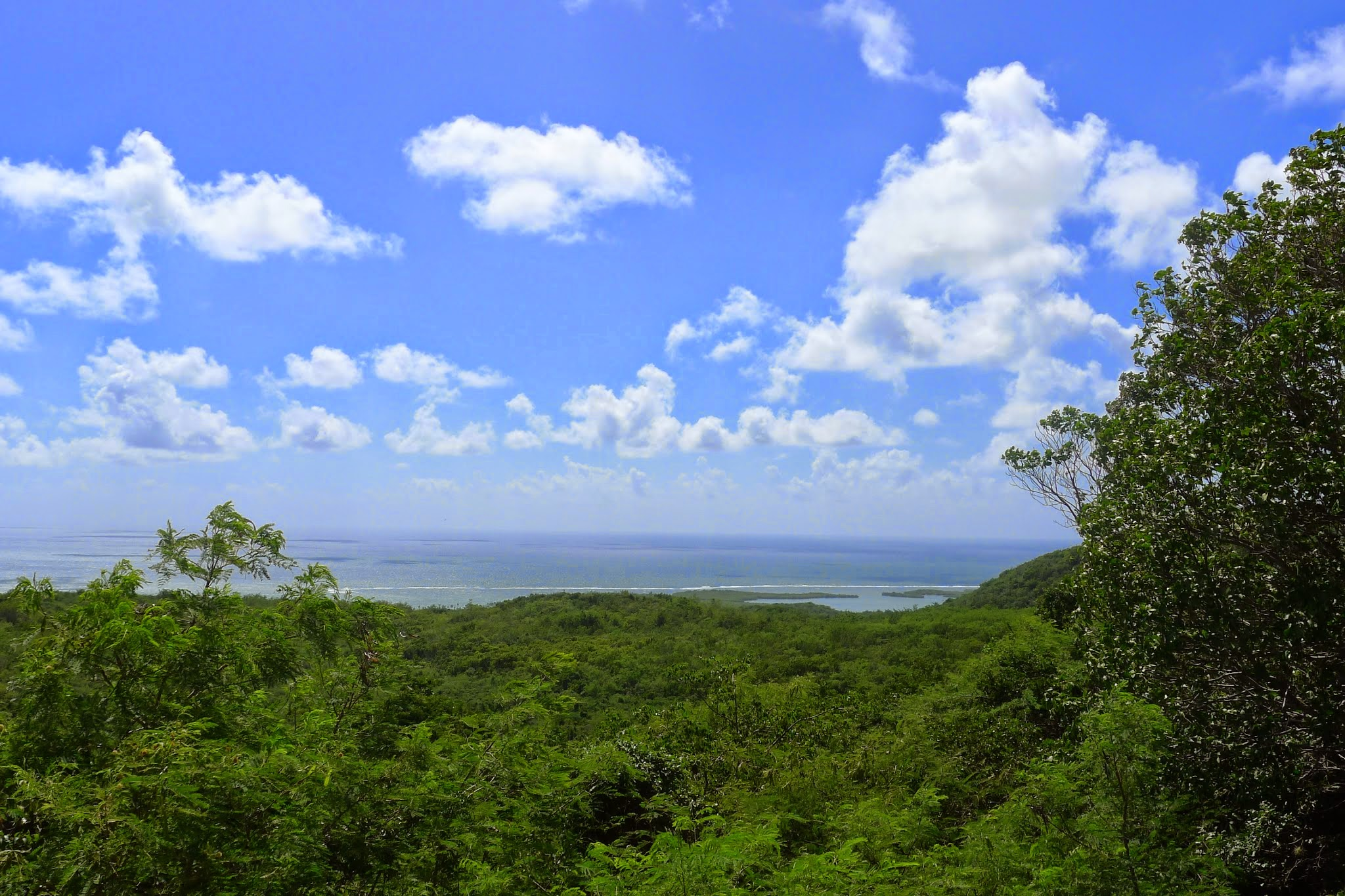
View of mountains of Carenero

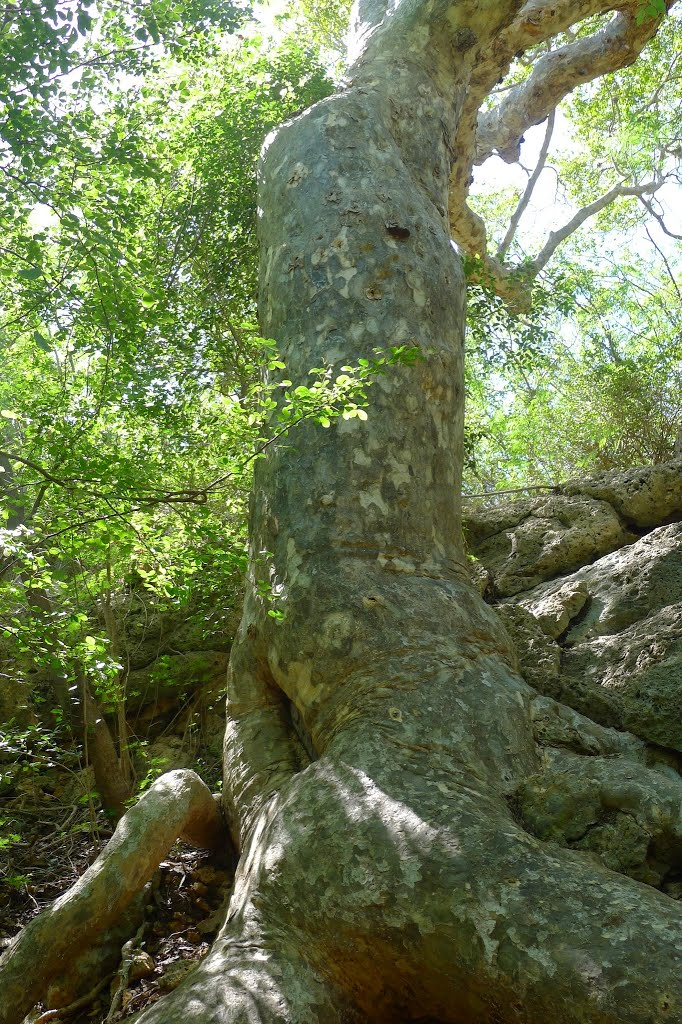
Tree in Guánica State Forest

== See also ==
- List of communities in Puerto Rico
