= Canoeing at the 2010 Central American and Caribbean Games =

Event held in Mayagüez, Puerto Rico

- Venue: Lake Cerrillos
- Location: Mayagüez
- Dates: 20–21 July

The Canoeing competition at the 2010 Central American and Caribbean Games was being held in Mayagüez, Puerto Rico.

The tournament was scheduled to be held from 20 to 21 July at the Lake Cerrillos in Ponce.

== Medal summary ==
=== Men's events ===
| Event | Gold | | Silver | | Bronze | |
|---|---|---|---|---|---|---|
| K1 1000m | Jose Ramos; Venezuela | 3:47.118 | Osbaldo Fuentes; Mexico | 3:54.095 | Wendy Franco; Dominican Republic | 3:59.363 |
| C1 1000m | José Cristóbal; Mexico | 4:09.786 | Edward Paredes; Venezuela | 4:11.711 | Carlos Escamilla; Colombia | 4:20.609 |
| K2 1000m | Venezuela | 3:21.839 | Mexico | 3:23.782 | Dominican Republic | 3:40.337 |
| C2 1000m | Venezuela | 3:42.462 | Mexico | 3:44.111 | Colombia | 3:50.258 |
| K4 1000m | Venezuela | 3:01.364 | Mexico | 3:05.462 | Dominican Republic | 3:16.578 |
| K1 200m | Manuel Cortina; Mexico | 36.594 | Jhonson Vergara; Venezuela | 38.058 | Krishna Angueira; Puerto Rico | 39.267 |
| C1 200m | Jose Silva; Venezuela | 42.723 | Jesus Escamilla; Colombia | 42.796 | Alejandro Royo; Mexico | 42.952 |
| K2 200m | Mexico | 33.249 | Venezuela | 33.258 | Puerto Rico | 35.875 |

=== Women's events ===
| Event | Gold | | Silver | | Bronze | |
|---|---|---|---|---|---|---|
| K4 500m | Mexico | 1:38.709 | Colombia | 1:44.220 | Venezuela | 1:45.869 |
| K1 500m | Tatiana Muñoz; Colombia | 1:58.206 | Denisse Olivella; Mexico | 1:59.035 | Eliana Escalona; Venezuela | 2:02.088 |
| K2 500m | Mexico | 1:46.223 | Colombia | 1:49.756 | Venezuela | 1:52.965 |
| K1 200m | Denisse Olivella; Mexico | 42.122 | Tatiana Muñoz; Colombia | 42.782 | Eliana Escalona; Venezuela | 44.551 |
