= Cerrillos State Forest =

State forest in Puerto Rico

Cerrillos State Forest Spanish: Bosque Estatal de Cerrillos
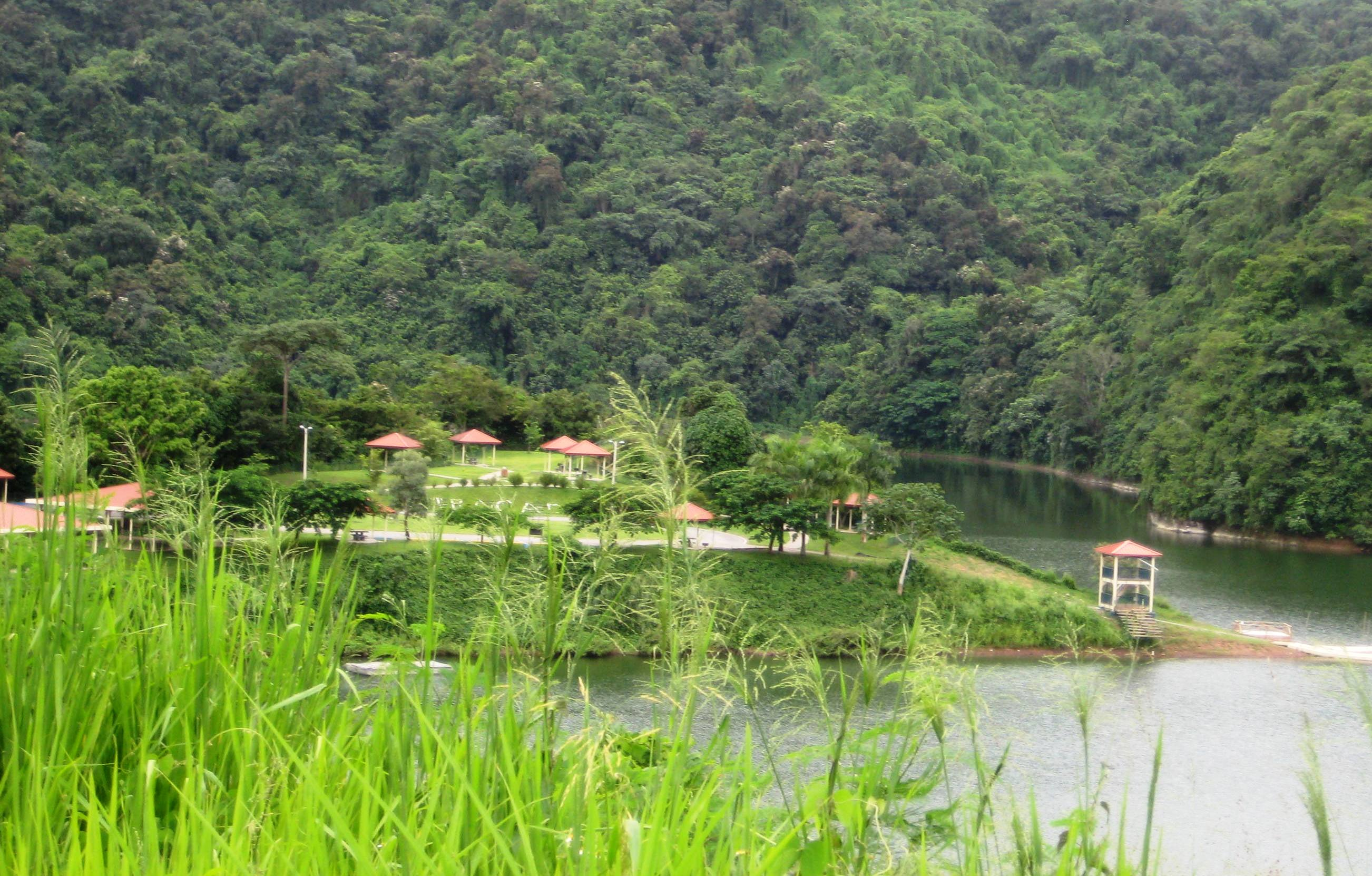
- Picnic area at Cerrillos State Forest, PR-139, km 3.4

- Location within Puerto Rico
- Interactive map of Cerrillos State Forest

Geography
- Location: PR-139, km. 3.4; Ponce, Puerto Rico
- Coordinates: 18°05′18″N 66°34′50″W
- Elevation: 1,000 feet (300 m)
- Area: > 200 cuerdas (≈ 194 acres)

Administration
- Status: Public, State (Commonwealth) forest
- Established: 25 September 1996
- Visitation: (2012)
- Events: 1993 Central American and Caribbean Games; 2010 Central American and Caribbean Games
- Authority: Puerto Rico Department of Natural and Environmental Resources
- Website: www.drna.gobierno.pr

Ecology
- Ecosystems: Subtropical Moist Zone (Zona Húmeda Subtropical): -Tabonuco forest (Bosque de Tabonuco).
- WWF Classification: Puerto Rican moist forests
- Disturbance: Hurricanes
- Forest cover: 60% (approx.)

Cerrillos State Forest is one of the 21 state forests in Puerto Rico. It is located in barrio Maragüez, in the municipality of Ponce, and covers 200 cuerdas (190 acres; 0.79 km^{2}) of valleys and mountains in the foothills of the Cordillera Central mountain range. The forest has several trails, observation areas, several picnic areas, complete with gazeebos and a man-made reservoir, Lake Cerrillos and the Lake Cerrillos dam.

== Location ==
The forest is located at 18.08842 N, 66.58058 W (18°5′18.31″N 66°24′50.08″W), in barrio Maragüez, which is located northeast of the city of Ponce, Puerto Rico. It can be reached via PR-139 Km 3.4. Its elevation varies from 400 to 1,000 feet above sea level.

== Recreation ==
Recreational activities permitted in this forest include fishing, hiking, kayaking, photography, picnicking, scientific research, and bird watching.

== Gallery ==
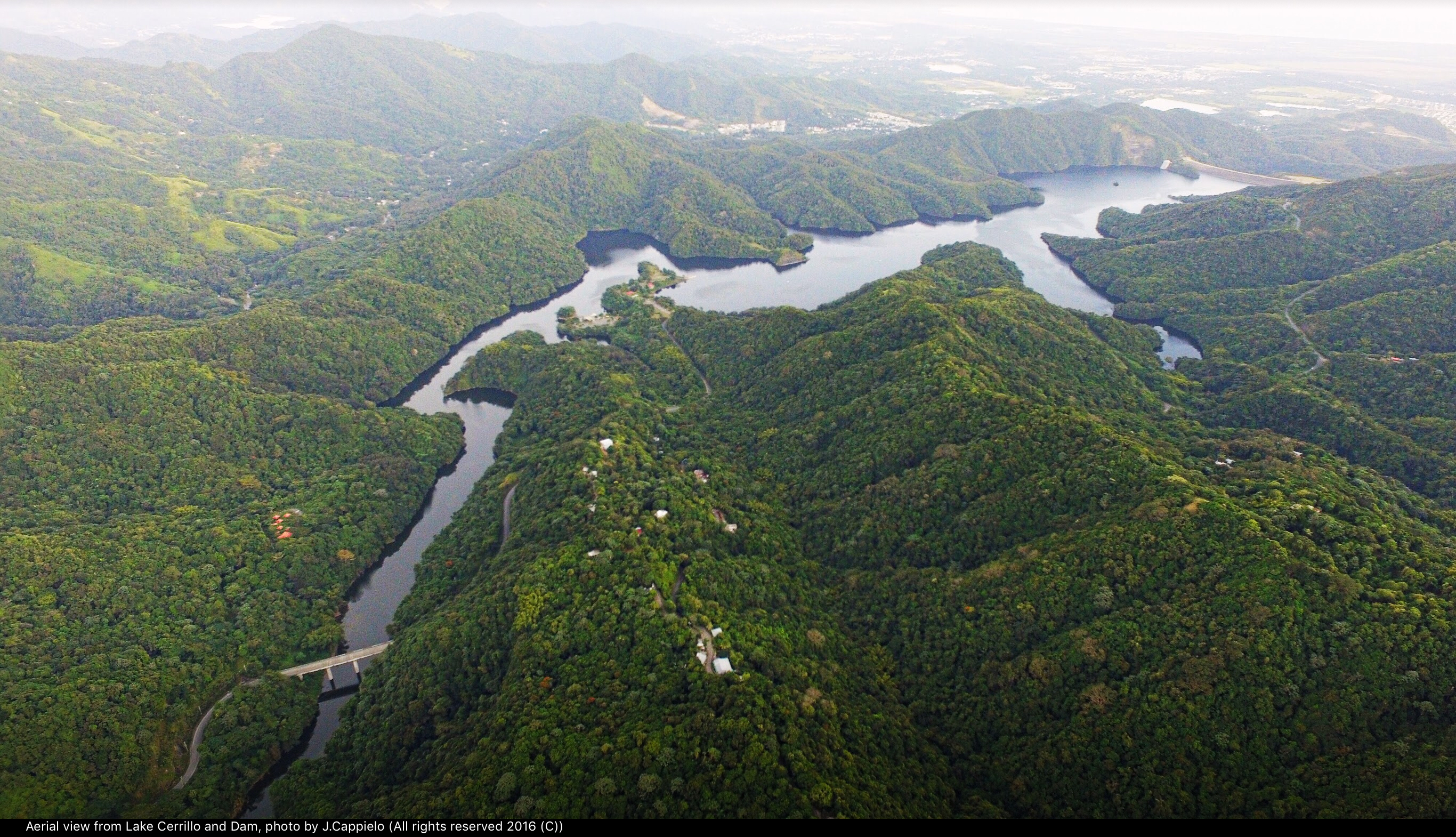
View of Cerrillos State Forest surrounding Lake Cerrillos.

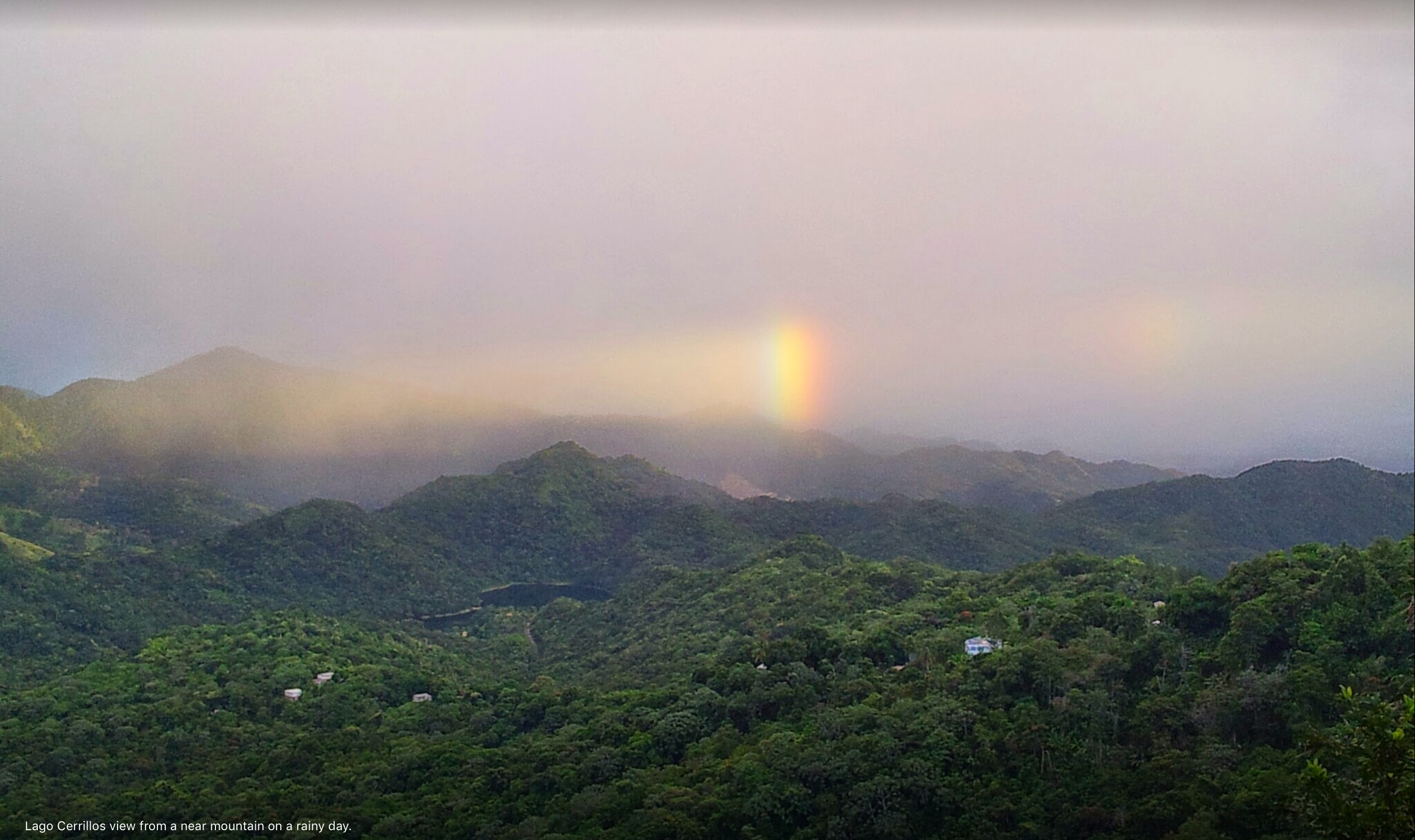
Cerrillos State Forest from the west.

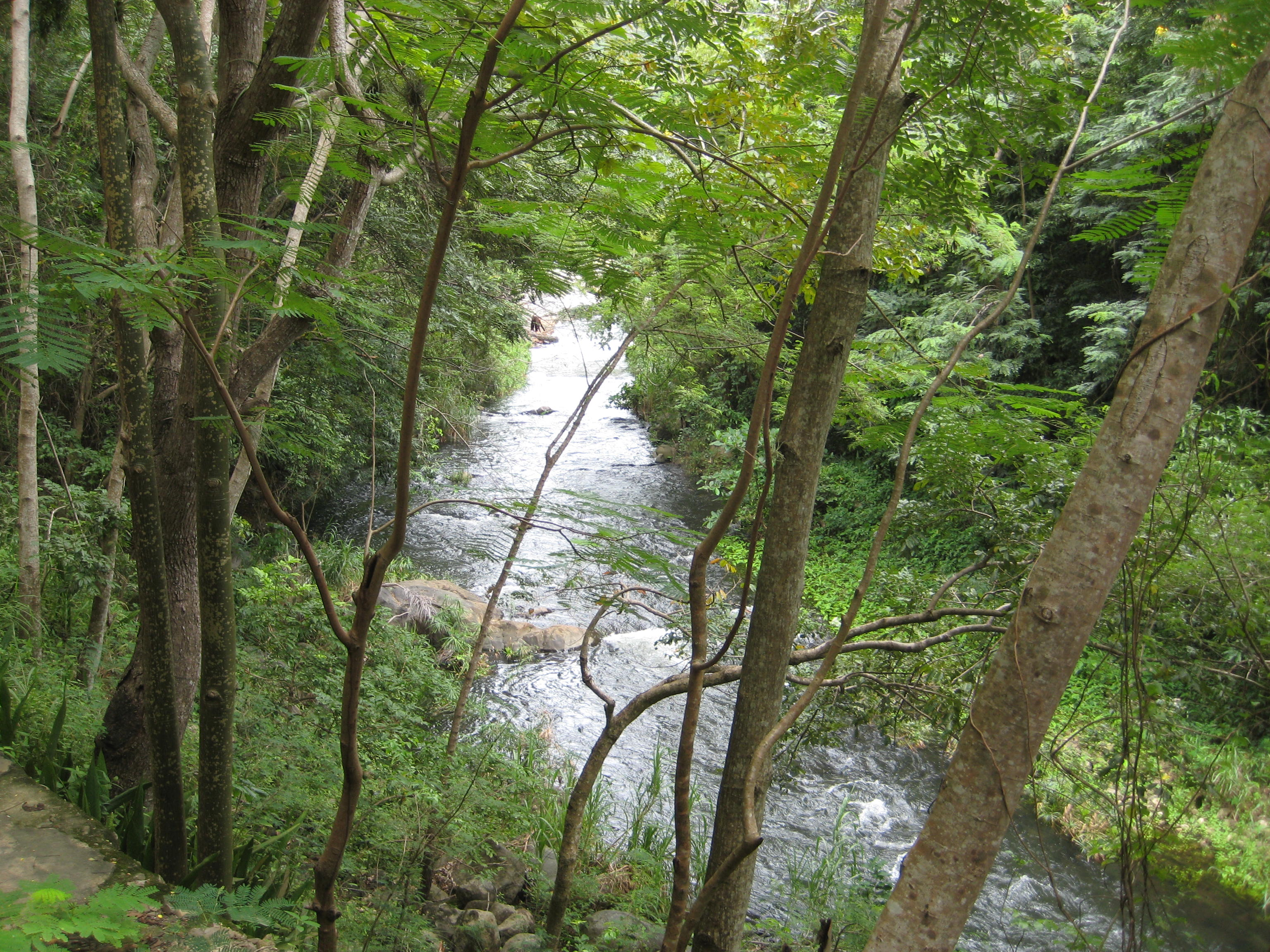
Cerrillos River

== See also ==
- List of Puerto Rico state forests
- List of National Natural Landmarks in Puerto Rico
- Cerro de Punta
- Porta Caribe
