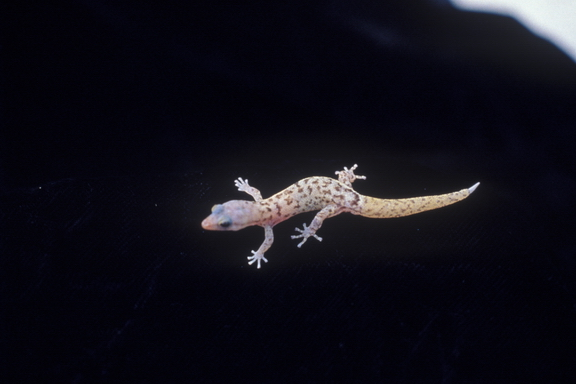

Conservation status
- Data Deficient (IUCN 3.1)

Scientific classification
- Kingdom: Animalia
- Phylum: Chordata
- Class: Reptilia
- Order: Squamata
- Suborder: Gekkota
- Family: Sphaerodactylidae
- Genus: Sphaerodactylus
- Species: S. micropithecus

Binomial name
- Sphaerodactylus micropithecus Schwartz, 1977

= Monito gecko =

Species of reptile

The Monito gecko (Sphaerodactylus micropithecus) is a species of gecko endemic to the island of Monito, in the archipelago of Puerto Rico.

== Habitat & distribution ==
The Monito gecko is restricted to two locations on Monito: along the island's northwestern shelf over a sea cave, and an area along the northeastern edge in the vicinity of Castle Rock measuring approximately 500 by 300 meters, an area of 0.15 square kilometres (0.058 sq mi). It was discovered in May 1974 when a single adult and an egg were collected from the island of Monito.

== Conservation ==
It is believed that its scarcity may be due to the introduction of rats to Monito and habitat destruction caused by United States Navy bombing practices after World War II. In 1982, a survey was conducted to establish the population range and size of the species. A total of 18 individuals were observed. For these reasons the species was placed in the endangered species list on October 15, 1982 by the United States Fish and Wildlife Service. Black (ship) rats were eradicated from the island by the Puerto Rico Department of Natural Environmental and Resources in 1992 and 1999. The geckos have thrived since the removal of rats, and were proposed in 2018 to be delisted from the Endangered Species list.

== Taxonomy ==
When first described, the Monito gecko was thought to be closely related to either the Mona least gecko (Sphaerodactylus monensis), a species endemic to the island of Mona located approximately 5 kilometres (3.1 mi) southeast of Monito or to the Desecheo least gecko (Sphaerodactylus levinsi) a species endemic to Desecheo Island. Subsequent studies proved that the Monito gecko is more closely related to S. macrolepis, a species common throughout the Puerto Rican Bank.

== Description ==
Due to the rarity of the species biological information is limited. The Monito gecko is light-gray to tan in coloration with darker spots on top of the body. The maximum length for this species is 36 mm from snout to vent. Information on the diet of the Monito gecko is currently unavailable but it is believed that, similar to other geckos, it is an insectivore and/or carnivore. Reproductive information is also limited but it is estimated that breeding season lasts from March to November. It is believed that females lay one or two eggs that hatch in 2 to 3 months. Contrary to the majority of geckos, it is diurnal.

== See also ==
- List of amphibians and reptiles of Puerto Rico
- Fauna of Puerto Rico
- List of endemic fauna of Puerto Rico
