= Lake Cerrillos =

Human-made lake located in Maragüez, Ponce, Puerto Rico

Lago Cerrillos
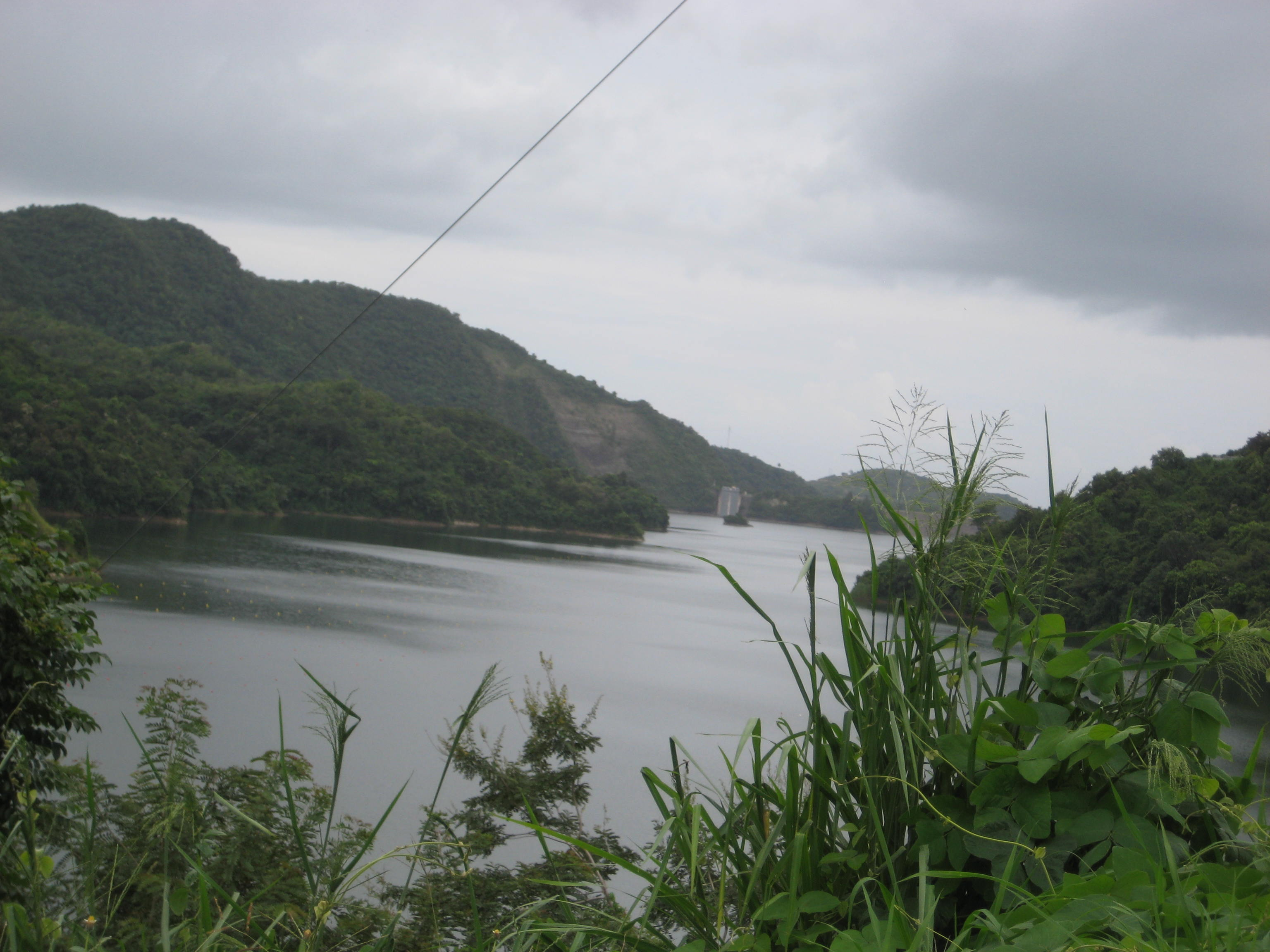
- Lake Cerrillos viewed facing south, with the Lake Cerrillos Dam in the distance

- Location within Puerto Rico
- Location: Barrio Maragüez, Ponce
- Coordinates: 18°05′20″N 66°34′45″W
- Type: artificial reservoir
- Basin countries: Puerto Rico
- Water volume: 47,900 acre-feet (59,100,000 m^{3})
- Settlements: Ponce

Lake Cerrillos (Spanish: Lago Cerrillos) is a human-made lake located in barrio Maragüez, Ponce, Puerto Rico. The lake was finished in 1992 by the U.S. Army Corps of Engineers. The main purposes of the reservoir are flood control, water supply, and recreation. There is a variety of fish available for fishing such as largemouth bass, bluegills, catfish and tilapias. The 1993 Central American and Caribbean Games that were held in Ponce staged the canoeing competitions in this lake. It was used in the 2010 Central American and Caribbean Games for the sports of Canoeing, Rowing. The lake is the main drinking water source for the city of Ponce.

== Dam ==
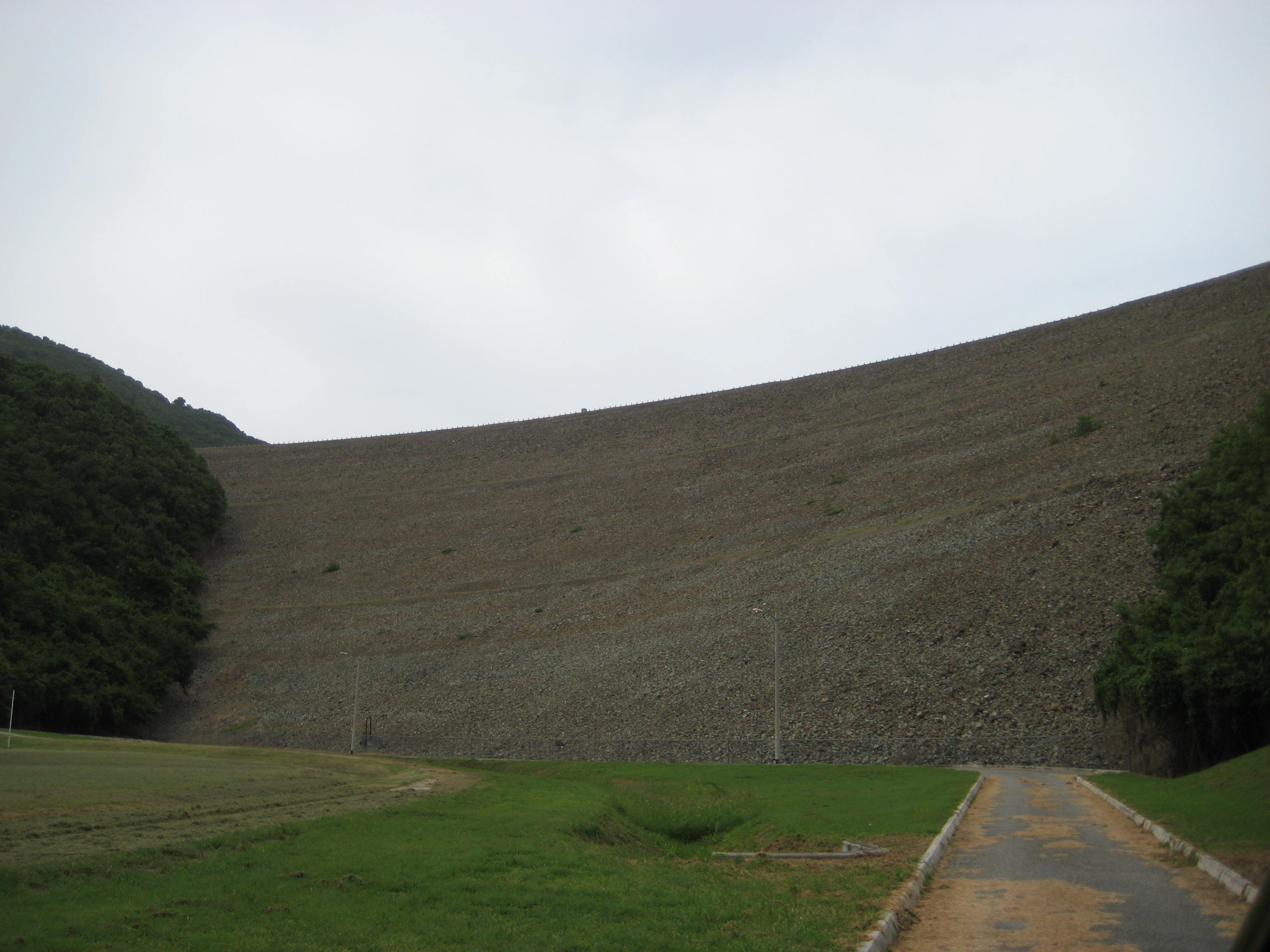
Lake Cerrillos Dam, as viewed from the Luis A. Wito Morales Park

The Lake Cerrillos Dam is located about four miles (6 km) northeast of Ponce. Construction of the dam started in 1984. After its completion in 1992, it still took a few more years for the initial filling of the reservoir. Lake Cerrillos Dam has a total capacity of 59 million cubic meters. In lieu of flood gates, it provides more than 80,000 cubic meters of water daily to the local population through a 434-meter long by 6 meter-wide tunnel at the dam base.

The dam is 323 feet (98 m) high by 1,555 feet (474 m) wide (over 1/4 mile wide). The Dam is located 9.5 miles (15.3 km) from the coast of Ponce, at 323 feet (98 m) above sea level. It provides a volume of 47,900 acre-feet (59,100,000 m^{3}) for flood control, as well as an estimated 22,000,000 US gallons per day (83,000 m^{3}/d) of drinking water. The ideal height of the reservoir for purposes of its drinking water supply is 173.40 meters. Details of the environmental variables in the Cerrillos Reservoir can be found in

== Recreational facilities ==
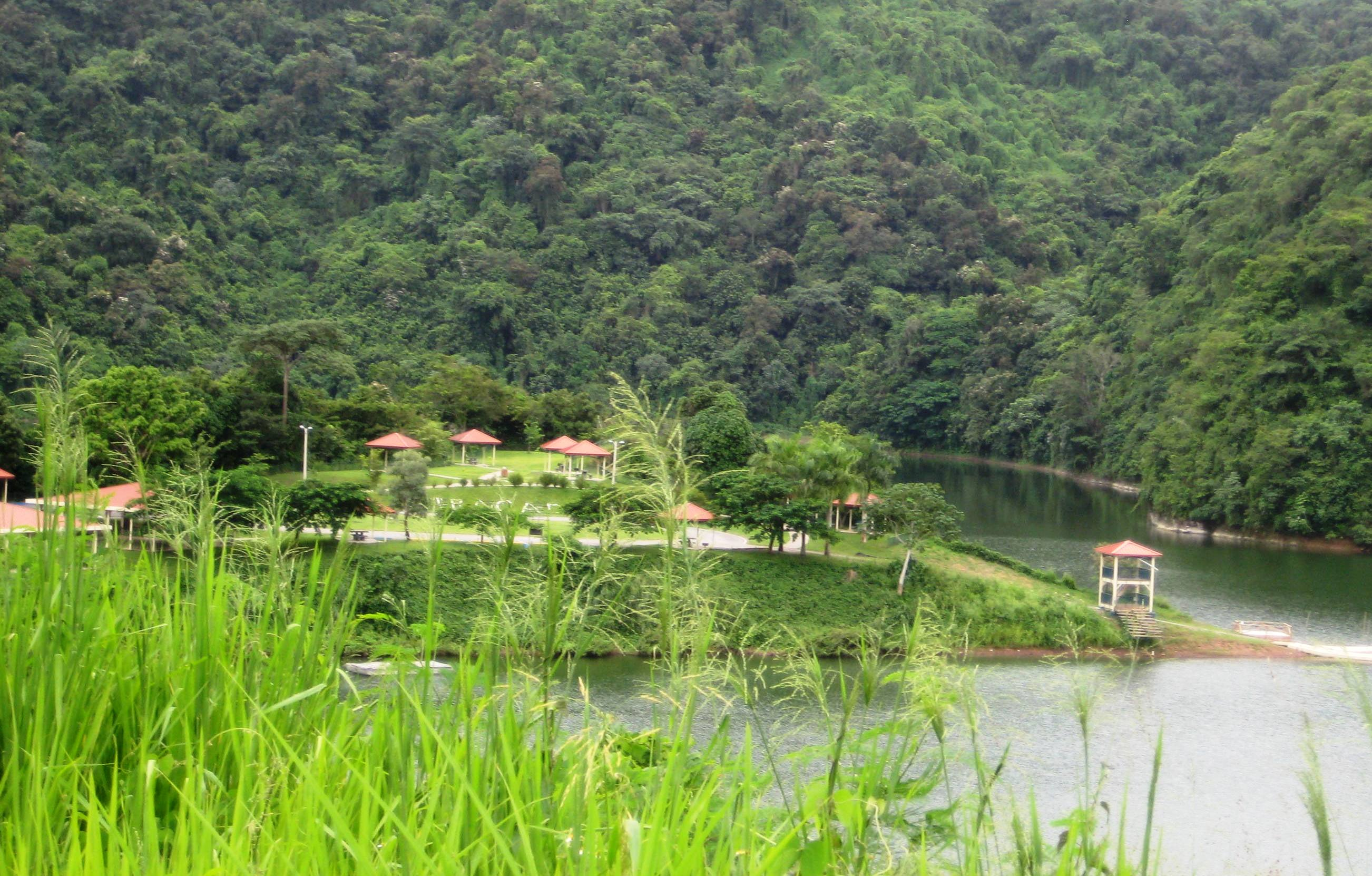
Cerrillos Park, located north of the lake, showing the Atracadero area

Two recreational areas were built as part of the dam development. The area north of the lake is the Cerrillos State Forest and includes Cerrillos Park, an active park with two ramps that may be used to launch boats, kayaks, canoes etc. There are also a few nature trails. Open-air kiosks with barbecue facilities intended for picnicking and socializing are also part of the park. There are five recreational areas at Cerrillos Park: Campo de Recreo, El Atracadero, Bella Mirada, El Mirador, and Alto Balcón. This area was designated as the Cerrillos State Forest under an Executive Order and it consists of more than 200 cuerdas (about 195 acres) of land. Various Games and competitions have taken place in this north area.

The second park is located south of the lake. This area south of the lake is the passive park Parque Luis A. Wito Morales and is frequently used by families and friends for social and recreational gatherings.

== 2010 Central American and Caribbean Games ==
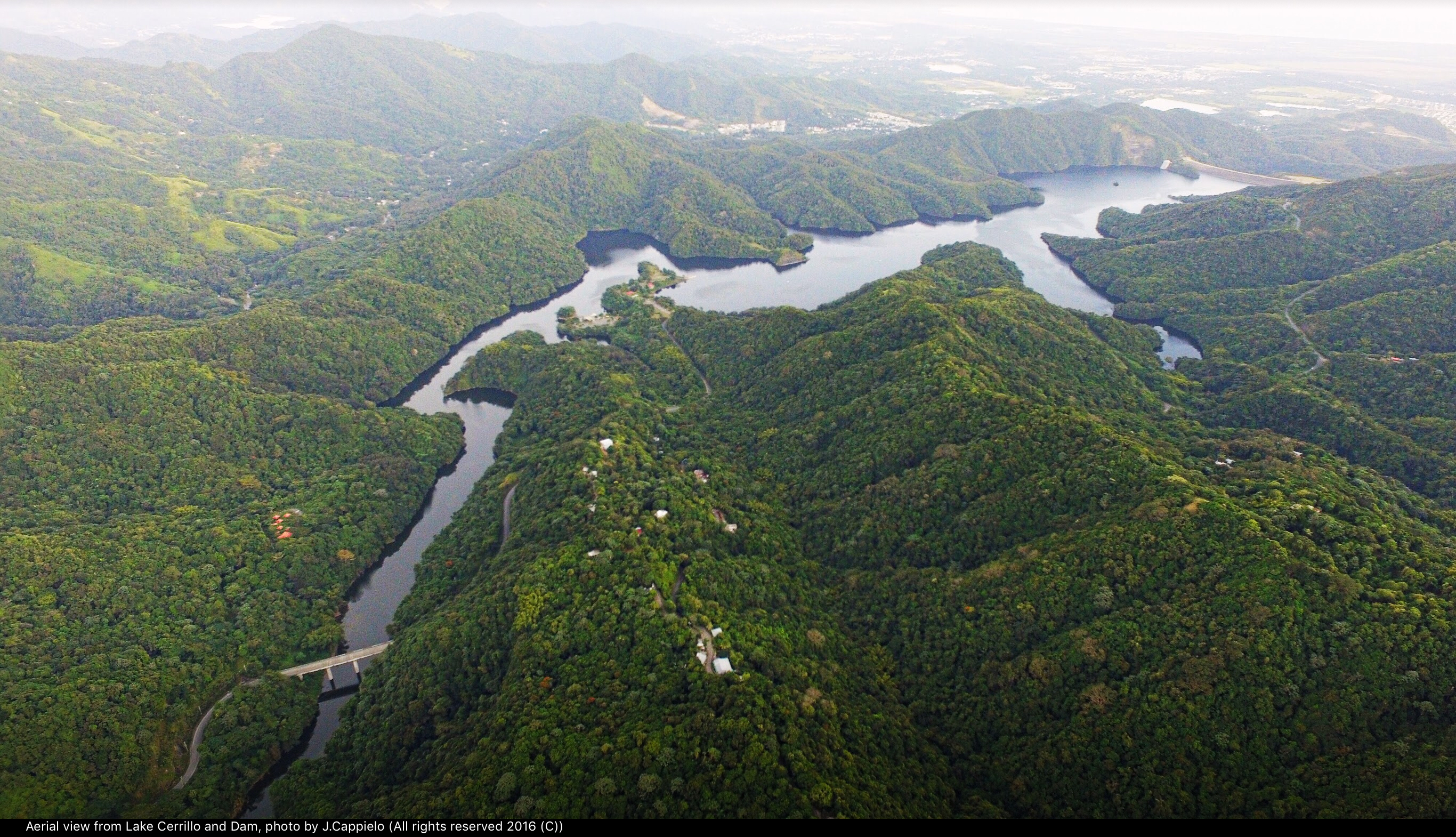
Aerial view from Cerrillos Lake and its dam, looking SSE

In 2010 Lake Cerrillos facilities were further improved to accommodate the rowing, canoeing and kayak a games of the 2010 Central American and Caribbean Games hosted in the city of Mayaguez. The improvements were made at a cost of $350,000.

The lake was also used for the 2013 Pan American Canoe Sprint Championships during 16 – 20 October 2013. It had also been used for that event in 1999.

== See also ==
- Río Bucaná
- Río Cerrillos
