= List of National Natural Landmarks in Puerto Rico =

From List of National Natural Landmarks, these are the National Natural Landmarks in Puerto Rico. There are 5 in total.

	Name	Image	Date	Location	Municipality	Ownership	Description
1	Baño de Oro Natural Area		1980	18.3080090°N 65.7615515°W	Río Grande	Federal (United States Forest Service)	The only contiguous area in Puerto Rico that contains subtropical wet forest, rain forest, dwarf forest, and Pterocarpus. Part of El Yunque National Forest.
2	Cabo Rojo		1980	17°56′01.2″N 67°11′31.9″W	Cabo Rojo	Territorial (Puerto Rico Department of Natural and Environmental Resources)	An excellent example of a tombolo with two sand spits.
3	Mona and Monito Islands		1975	18°5′5.2″N 67°51′4.4″W	Mayagüez	Territorial (Puerto Rico Department of Natural and Environmental Resources)	Caves on these islands are some of the most extensive flank margin caves in the world.
4	Puerto Mosquito		1980	18°06′07″N 65°26′45″W	Vieques	Territorial (Puerto Rico Department of Natural and Environmental Resources)	Considered the best example of a bioluminescent bay in the United States.
5	Río Abajo State Forest		1980	18°20′23″N 66°41′59″W	Utuado	Territorial (Puerto Rico Department of Natural and Environmental Resources)	An excellent example of karst topography with numerous sinkholes and well-developed tower karst.

== See also ==
- List of National Historic Landmarks in Puerto Rico
