= Mona least gecko =

Conservation status
- Least Concern (IUCN 3.1)

Scientific classification
- Kingdom: Animalia
- Phylum: Chordata
- Class: Reptilia
- Order: Squamata
- Suborder: Gekkota
- Family: Sphaerodactylidae
- Genus: Sphaerodactylus
- Species: S. monensis

Binomial name
- Sphaerodactylus monensis Meerwarth, 1901

Species of reptile

The Mona least gecko (Sphaerodactylus monensis) is a species of lizard in the family Sphaerodactylidae. It is endemic to Isla de Mona of Puerto Rico.
