= Bobby Ramírez Kurtz =

Puerto Rican politician

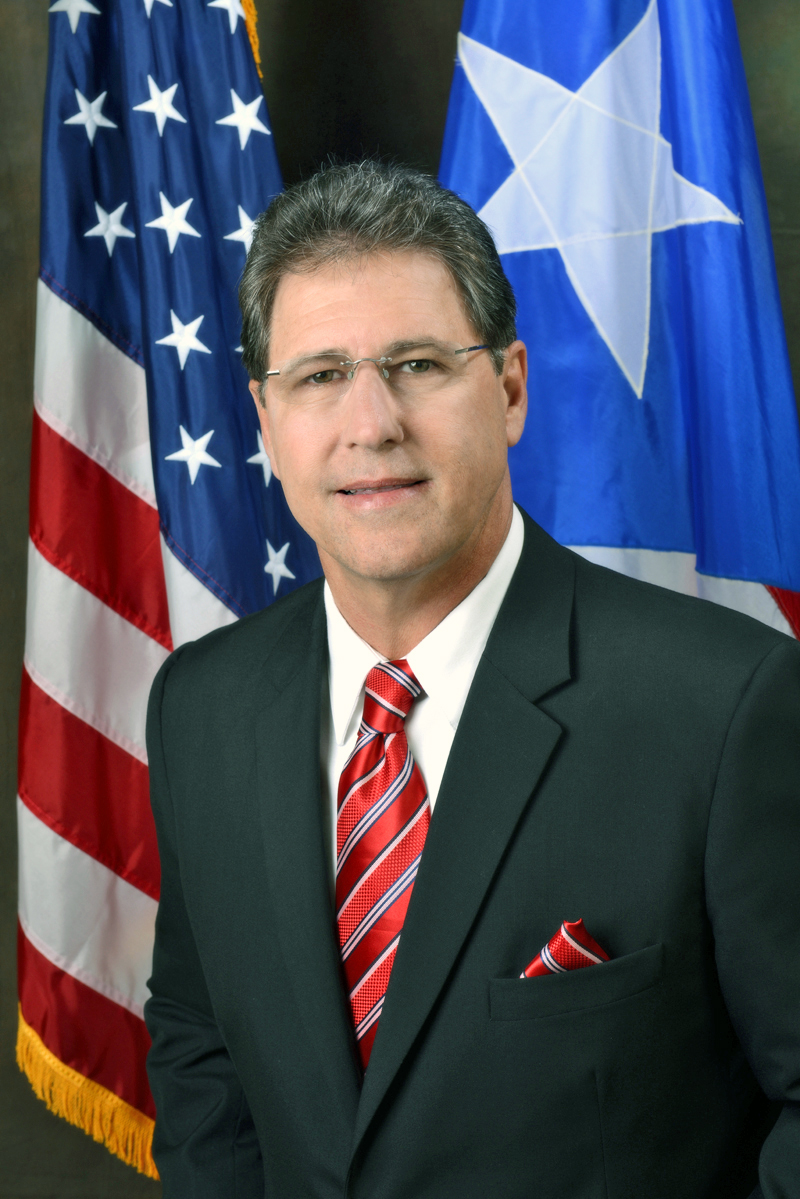

Mayor of Cabo Rojo
- In office January 14, 2013 – January 10, 2021
- Preceded by: Perza Rodríguez Quiñones
- Succeeded by: Jorge Morales Wiscovitch

Personal details
- Born: October 29, 1959 (age 66) Cabo Rojo, Puerto Rico
- Party: Popular Democratic Party
- Spouse: Odalys Santiago Vélez
- Children: Roberto, José, Von Yaid
- Education: University of Puerto Rico at Mayagüez; Interamerican University of Puerto Rico at San Germán

Roberto "Bobby" Ramírez Kurtz (born October 29, 1959) is a Puerto Rican politician and the former mayor of Cabo Rojo, Puerto Rico. He is affiliated with the Popular Democratic Party (PPD) and served as mayor from 2013 to 2021. He assumed office after beating incumbent Perza Rodrígues Quiñones in the 2012 general election. Rodríguez, a member of the New Progressive Party (PNP), became mayor after the death of Santos Padilla Ferrer in 2007. Ramírez Kurtz was succeeded by Jorge "Jorgito: Morales Wiscovitch of the PNP after winning the mayoral race in the 2020 general election.

In 2017, Kurtz implemented the "Orange Initiative" (Iniciativa Naranja in Spanish), which was met with controversy. The initiative establishes that citizens must buy orange trash bags provided by the trash-collecting private company that operates in Cabo Rojo if they want their trash to be collected. Kurtz stopped "Iniciativa Naranja", after days in court, because the government gave funds to Cabo Rojo's junkyard that would last at least five years.
