= Perza Rodríguez =

Puerto Rican politician

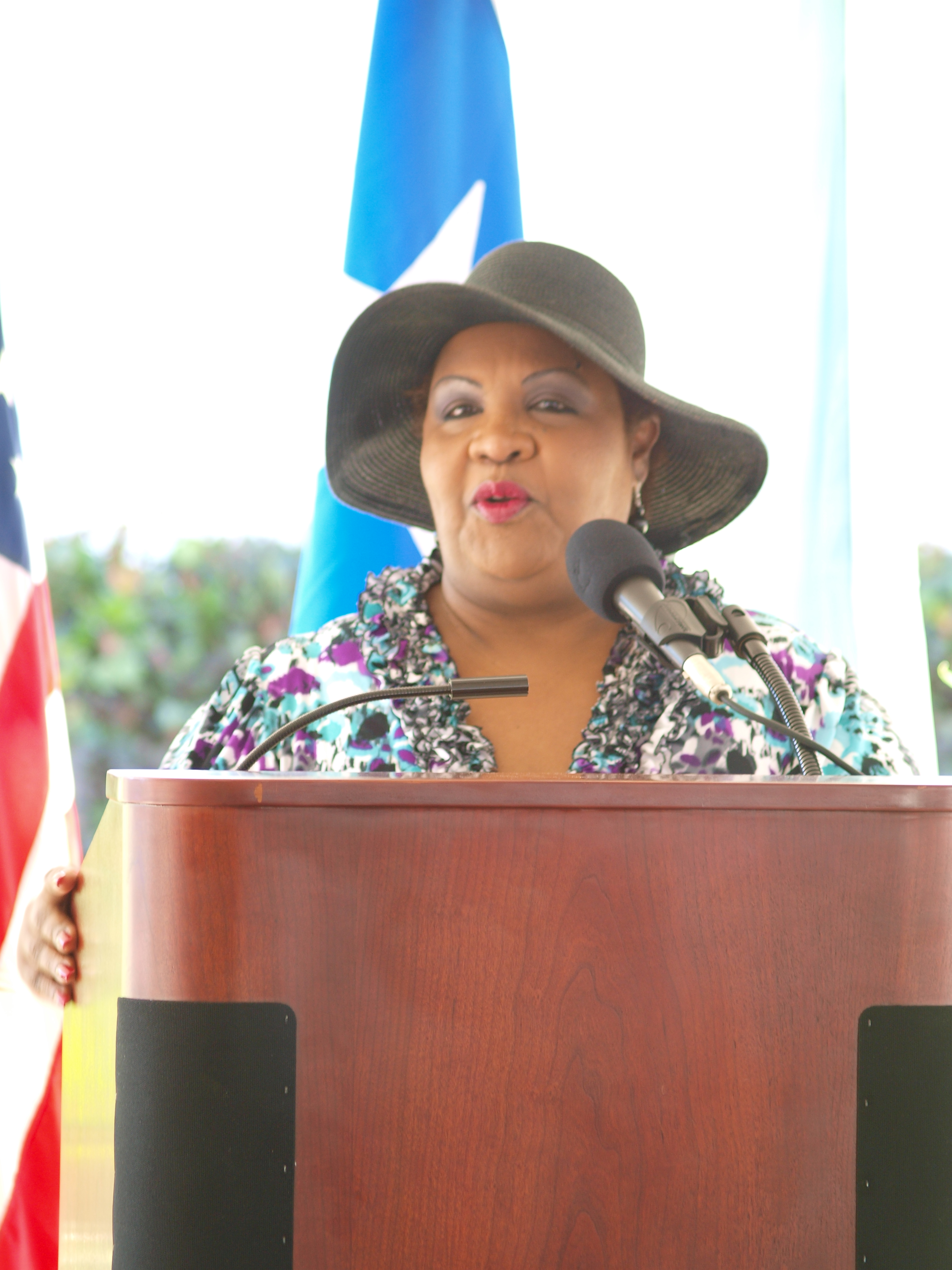

Mayor of Cabo Rojo
- In office August 16, 2007 – January 13, 2013
- Preceded by: Santos Padilla
- Succeeded by: Roberto Ramírez Kurtz

Member of the Municipal Assembly of Cabo Rojo, Puerto Rico
- In office 2004-2007

Personal details
- Born: July 14, 1957 (age 69) San Germán, Puerto Rico
- Party: New Progressive Party (PNP)
- Spouse: Osvaldo Fargas Falú (1983-present)
- Children: Luis Alberto; Alana Bethzaida; Lorena Del Carmen.
- Education: University of Puerto Rico at Mayagüez (BBA)

Perza Rodríguez Quiñones (born July 14, 1957) is a Puerto Rican politician and former mayor of Cabo Rojo. Rodríguez is affiliated with the New Progressive Party (PNP) and served as mayor from 2007 to 2013.

== Early years and studies ==
Perza Rodríguez Quiñones was born in San Germán on July 14, 1957. She is the daughter of Perfecto Rodríguez Cabassa and Zaida Quiñones Suárez. Perza's name is a portmanteau of the names of his parents, Perfecto and Zaida. She also has two sisters: Sandra and Zaida del Carmen. Since her childhood, Perza developed a friendship with Santos Padilla, who would later become Mayor of Cabo Rojo, and her boss.

Perza completed her elementary and high school studies in her hometown. She then enrolled at the University of Puerto Rico at Mayagüez where she completed a Bachelor's degree in Business Management, graduating in 1979.

== Professional career ==
In 1980, Perza began working for BAL Management Corp. in the administration of public housing buildings with federal funds (HUD). She worked as administrator of a condominium called Joan Apartments, located in San Germán.

In 1988, Perza began working at her father's business in Cabo Rojo.

== Public service ==
Rodríguez was hired to work at the Center of Collection of Municipal Taxes (CRIM) by Santos "San" Padilla as appraiser in the Mayagüez office. She then became Regional Manager. Upon being elected at the 1996 general election, Padilla appointed Rodríguez as Deputy Mayor of Cabo Rojo.

== Political career ==
Santos Padilla died of a massive heart attack on August 4, 2007. Rodríguez became Interim Mayor until she was officially sworn as Mayor on August 16, 2007. The next year, she was officially elected at the 2008 general election.

In 2012, Rodríguez was challenged by José "Chiquin" Morales at the PNP primaries, but she prevailed. However, she was still defeated at the general election that same year.

== Business endeavors ==
In March 2013, Rodríguez announced she would open a restaurant in Cabo Rojo, near the Joyuda Lagoon. The restaurant, called Perza's Puerto Rican Food & Bar, opened on April 12, 2013. Although she has hired two chefs, Rodríguez said she would occasionally cook herself at her restaurant.

== Personal life ==
Rodríguez married Osvaldo Fargas Falú on September 16, 1983. They have three children together: Luis Alberto, Alana Bethzaida and Lorena Del Carmen.
