= List of lakes of Puerto Rico =

This is a list of lakes in Puerto Rico.

Puerto Rico is an archipelago composed by an eponymous main island, the isle municipalities of Vieques and Culebra, as well as several cays.

Lake	Surface area	Maximum depth	Elevation	Coordinates	Municipality
Baño Grande Pool			2,110 feet (640 m)	18.301620°N 65.785163°W	Río Grande
Boca de la Zanja					Aguada
Caño Boquerón			13 feet (4.0 m)	18.007741°N 67.173790°W	Cabo Rojo
Charco Azul			1,998 feet (609 m)	18.091351°N 66.030998°W	Patillas
El Salto			551 feet (168 m)	18.39106°N 66.453226°W	Manatí
Lasen el sector de Joyuda Damas Pool			564 feet (172 m)	18.32412°N 65.742107°W	Luquillo
Lago Bronce			167 feet (51 m)	18.028298°N 66.568784°W	Ponce
Lago Guayabal			103.94 metres (341.0 ft)		Villalba
Lago Gely			203 feet (62 m)	18.047186°N 66.571839°W	Ponce
Lago Giles			312 feet (95 m)	18.038575°N 66.564895°W	Ponce
Lago Managua			13 feet (4.0 m)	18.434113°N 65.977943°W	Carolina
Lago Ponceña			246 feet (75 m)	18.056908°N 66.540728°W	Juana Díaz
Lago Vista Alegre			312 feet (95 m)	18.065796°N 66.552673°W	Ponce
Lagos de Levittown			16 feet (4.9 m)	18.45939°N 66.193501°W	Bayamón
Laguna Aguas Prietas			13 feet (4.0 m)	18.370507°N 65.643773°W	Fajardo
Laguna Algodones			36 feet (11 m)	18.156074°N 65.373769°W	Vieques
Laguna Anones			10 feet (3.0 m)	18.137463°N 65.296824°W	Vieques
Laguna Arenas			36 feet (11 m)	18.116074°N 65.570716°W	Vieques
Laguna Atolladero			3 feet (0.91 m)	18.131624°N 67.183791°W	Cabo Rojo
Laguna Bocanasilla			7 feet (2.1 m)	18.153012°N 67.164902°W	Cabo Rojo
Laguna Cartagena			33 feet (10 m)	18.013852°N 67.101012°W	Lajas
Laguna El Pobre			10 feet (3.0 m)	18.119129°N 65.562660°W	Vieques
Laguna Grande			10 feet (3.0 m)	18.376340°N 65.623217°W	Fajardo
Laguna Guaniquilla			0 feet (0 m)	18.037462°N 67.201847°W	Cabo Rojo
Laguna Joyuda	339 acres (137 ha)		3 feet (0.91 m)	18.130513°N 67.177124°W	Cabo Rojo
Laguna Kiani			0 feet (0 m)	18.114685°N 65.561271°W	Vieques
Laguna La Plata			10 feet (3.0 m)	18.119409°N 65.377936°W	Vieques
Laguna La Torrecilla			16 feet (4.9 m)	18.443835°N 65.982943°W	Loíza, Carolina
Laguna Lobina			10 feet (3.0 m)	18.301345°N 65.300714°W	Culebra
Laguna Los Corozos			0 feet (0 m)	18.439668°N 66.038499°W	San Juan, Carolina
Laguna Mata Redonda			3 feet (0.91 m)	18.474112°N 66.310725°W	Dorado
Laguna Matías			3 feet (0.91 m)	18.124964°N 65.329047°W	Vieques
Laguna Monte Largo			10 feet (3.0 m)	18.153018°N 65.362936°W	Vieques
Laguna Playa Grande			0 feet (0 m)	18.089965°N 65.517104°W	Vieques
Laguna Puerto Diablo			0 feet (0 m)	18.144685°N 65.332102°W	Vieques
Laguna Rica			23 feet (7.0 m)	18.451891°N 66.426559°W	Vega Baja
Laguna San José			0 feet (0 m)	18.424947°N 66.024888°W	Carolina
Laguna Tortuguero	600 acres (240 ha)		3 feet (0.91 m)	18.463279°N 66.441282°W	Manatí, Vega Baja
Laguna Yanuel			3 feet (0.91 m)	18.126908°N 65.372102°W	Vieques
Laguna Zoní	26,731 m^{2}		10 feet (3.0 m)	18.320234°N 65.259323°W	Culebra
Laguna de Cornelio			13 feet (4.0 m)	18.310512°N 65.314881°W	Culebra
Laguna de Lobine			10 feet (3.0 m)	18.301345°N 65.300991°W	Culebra
Laguna de Molino			0 feet (0 m)	18.320234°N 65.237101°W	Culebra
Laguna de Pinoñes			3 feet (0.91 m)	18.438279°N 65.953221°W	Loíza
Laguna de Puerto Nuevo			10 feet (3.0 m)	18.483000°N 66.407392°W	Vega Baja
Laguna de las Salinas			0 feet (0 m)	17.971356°N 66.669340°W	Ponce
Laguna del Condado			0 feet (0 m)	18.458279°N 66.079888°W	San Juan
Laguna del Flamenco	278,387 m^{2}		10 feet (3.0 m)	18.324400°N 65.31627°W	Culebra
Mar Negro			3 feet (0.91 m)	17.945245°N 66.259890°W	Salinas
Pozo Del Rey			413 feet (126 m)	18.466889°N 66.935179°W	Quebradillas

== See also ==
- List of dams and reservoirs in Puerto Rico
- List of swamps of Puerto Rico
