= Efrén Pérez Rivera =

Puerto Rican scientist

Efrén Pérez Rivera (March 10, 1929 – May 15, 2011) was a Puerto Rican environmentalist leader and college professor.

== Biography ==
Efrén Pérez Rivera was born on March 10, 1929, at Mayagüez, Puerto Rico, where he lived during his first years. At the age of four, he moved with his family to Cabo Rojo, Puerto Rico. He attended the College of Agriculture and Mechanical Arts (known today as the University of Puerto Rico at Mayagüez), obtaining a bachelor's degree in biology in 1952. Pérez later became a professor of biology and chemistry at the Peñuelas High School.

Pérez did his obligatory military service in the U.S. Army during the Korean War, during which he was stationed in Hawaii.

In 1953, he worked at the Agricultural Experimental Station at both Isabela and Lajas. He later obtained a master's degree in environmental health from the Tropical School of Medicine at San Juan.

== Community involvement ==
During the 1960s, Pérez became a member of Cabo Rojo's Credit and Savings Cooperative( Cooperativa de Ahorro y Crédito de Cabo Rojo) and joined its Education Committee. As a member of this committee, he visited the communities of Cabo Rojo and worked to make the public aware of the philosophy and advantages of the cooperative movement. Also, he was the president of the Supervision Committee. During the first half of the 1970s, he worked in the Cooperative Development Administration. In December 1977 he obtained a master's degree in Horticulture from the University of Puerto Rico at Mayagüez. He then went on to become a professor in the College of Agricultural Science from that institution. During this time, he also took an active role in the organization of Cabo Rojo's Cooperative Pharmacy (Farmacia Cooperativa de Cabo Rojo) and became the president of its board of directors.

In 1983 he became the president of the Puerto Rican Independence Party's (PIP) Cabo Rojo committee. In 1988, under his presidency, the party obtained the largest percentage of local votes for the governor's seat in the history of Cabo Rojo (11.2%). He also obtained the largest percentage of votes for a district representative seat, compared with the rest of his fellow candidates.

His knowledge and convictions led him to join the environmental crusades against the Adjuntas copper mines, the construction of Club Med in Guánica, the installation of a Voice of America transmitter in Cabo Rojo, the construction of the Cogentrix carbon-based electrical plant in Mayagüez, amongst others.

In 1990 Pérez organized Caborrojeños Pro Salud y Ambiente This organization was designed to encourage and promote the well-being, the conservation of natural resources and the sustainable economic development of the Cabo Rojo region. Caborrojeños pro Salud y Ambiente along with United States Fish and Wildlife Service were the primary promoters of a research and visitors center located at the Cabo Rojo salt mines. The center is named Centro Intepretativo Las Salinas De Cabo Rojo don Efrén Pérez Rivera in his honor.

In a joint venture with the Puerto Rico Department of Natural and Environmental Resources, the committee had a major role in the restoration project of Isla de Ratones, a small key by the coast of Cabo Rojo that is rapidly losing its surface area due to erosion. Pérez has occupied the presidency of Caborrojeños pro Salud y Ambiente several times from its inception through 2005 when he was succeeded by fellow professor Pedro Valle Carlo. Pérez died on May 15, 2011.

== Personal life ==
At the age of 28, he married Pezinka Berenguer. He had three children with her: Efrén Pérez Berenguer, Manuel Pérez Berenguer, and José Luis Pérez Berenguer.

== Awards and recognitions ==
Pérez has been recognized by several institutions and organization for his civic work and pro-environment values. Some of the institutions and organizations that have recognized his work are:

- The University of Puerto Rico
- The Ana G. Mendez University System
- Jornada de Betances
- Cooperativa de Ahorro y Credito de Cabo Rojo
- Farmacia Cooperativa de Cabo Rojo
- The municipal government of Cabo Rojo
- The Puerto Rico Tourism Company
- The United States Fish and Wildlife Service

Pérez has also received several awards, including:

- 1999 - Public Awareness Award, Conferencia de Bosque de Puerto Rico
- 2000 - Environmental Award, Universidad Interamericana of San Germán
- 2003 - Environmental Quality Award, Environmental Protection Agency (E.P.A.)
- 2005 - Named part of the E.P.A.'s Environmental Justice Advisory Council

== See also ==
- List of Puerto Ricans
