= Pedro Valle Carlo =

Puerto Rican educator

Dr. Pedro Valle Carlo (born 1944 in San Juan, Puerto Rico), is a retired college professor and noted environmentalist leader based in western Puerto Rico.

Pedro Valle Carlo was born in Santurce. His mother was Blanca Carlo and his father Pedro Valle Bonilla. He was raised in Cabo Rojo, attending the local public grammar school and high school.

Valle Carlo enrolled at the University of Puerto Rico at Mayagüez as a civil engineering major in 1962. He soon changed majors to management. He earned his degree in 1966. After graduation, he married Dafne Javier Montalvo, whom he had met at a local social event. Valle Carlo then moved on to pursue a graduate degree at the University of Puerto Rico at Río Piedras while Javier Montalvo worked on her own graduate degree in psychology at the same institution.

After graduation, the couple first moved to Spain and then to New York City to pursue doctoral studies. Valle Carlo earned a PhD in labor management from New York University in 1984.

From 1976 to 1995, Valle Carlo was a professor at the Business Administration department of the University of Puerto Rico at Cayey. In 1995, he was named director of the graduate program at his alma mater in Mayagüez. He retired from active academics in 2005.

== Environmental work ==
Valle Carlo began his involvement with the environmentalist movement in the early 1990s by joining the Sociedad de Historia Natural, a local environmentalist group. With the group, Valle Carlo was involved in several initiatives, including protesting the use of El Yunque forest by the US Armed Forces.

In 1996, Valle Carlo was the driving force behind the formation of the West Chapter of the Asociacion de Acampadores de Puerto Rico (Puerto Rico Campers Association.)

In 2000, Valle Carlo became involved with Caborrojeños Pro Salud y Ambiente, a local environmentalist group. He was part of the movement to save the Los Morrillos Lighthouse and the surrounding salt mines. He was instrumental in the acquisition and creation of the Centro Interpretativo, a visitor center that offers tourists free guided tours to the surrounding forest and natural preserve.

Valle Carlo also spearheaded the initiative to save Isla de Ratones (Mice Island), a small key off the coast of Cabo Rojo that is rapidly losing its surface area through erosion. He led the effort to replant mangroves and repopulate the coral reef in order to stop the island's erosion.

In 2005 he was named president of Caborrojeños Pro Salud y Ambiente.

== Community work ==
In 2000, following a conversation with famed Puerto Rican painter Alfonso Arana at the local plaza, Valle Carlo and his wife decided to do something to help the local artistic community. The couple, and a group of local volunteers, incorporated Arte en la Plaza Betances, a unique community group dedicated to bringing art to the urban center of Cabo Rojo, specifically the Ramón Emeterio Betances plaza at the town's center.

The group sponsors a yearly art open air exhibit and competition of young local painters as well as other activities, such as a concert by the Arturo Somohano Philharmonic Orchestra at the Betances plaza. The example of Arte en la Plaza Betances has been well received and other Arte en la Plaza organizations have begun to prop up around the island of Puerto Rico.

== See also ==
- List of Puerto Ricans
