= List of swamps of Puerto Rico =

This is a list of Swamps - (Ciénagas) in these municipalities of Puerto Rico.

- Añasco
  - Ciénaga El Guayabal
  - Ciénaga Isabel
  - Ciénaga Pozo Hondo
- Arecibo
  - Ciénaga Tiburones
- Cabo Rojo
  - Ciénaga de Cuevas
- Cataño
  - Ciénaga de las Cucharillas
- Río Grande
  - Ciénaga La Picúa
- Toa Baja
  - Ciénaga de San Pedro
- Vega Alta
  - Ciénaga Prieta

== See also ==
- List of lakes of Puerto Rico
- List of dams and reservoirs in Puerto Rico
