= Cabo Rojo barrio-pueblo =

Historical and administrative center (seat) of Cabo Rojo, Puerto Rico

Cabo Rojo barrio-pueblo Pueblo de Cabo Rojo
- Municipality Seat
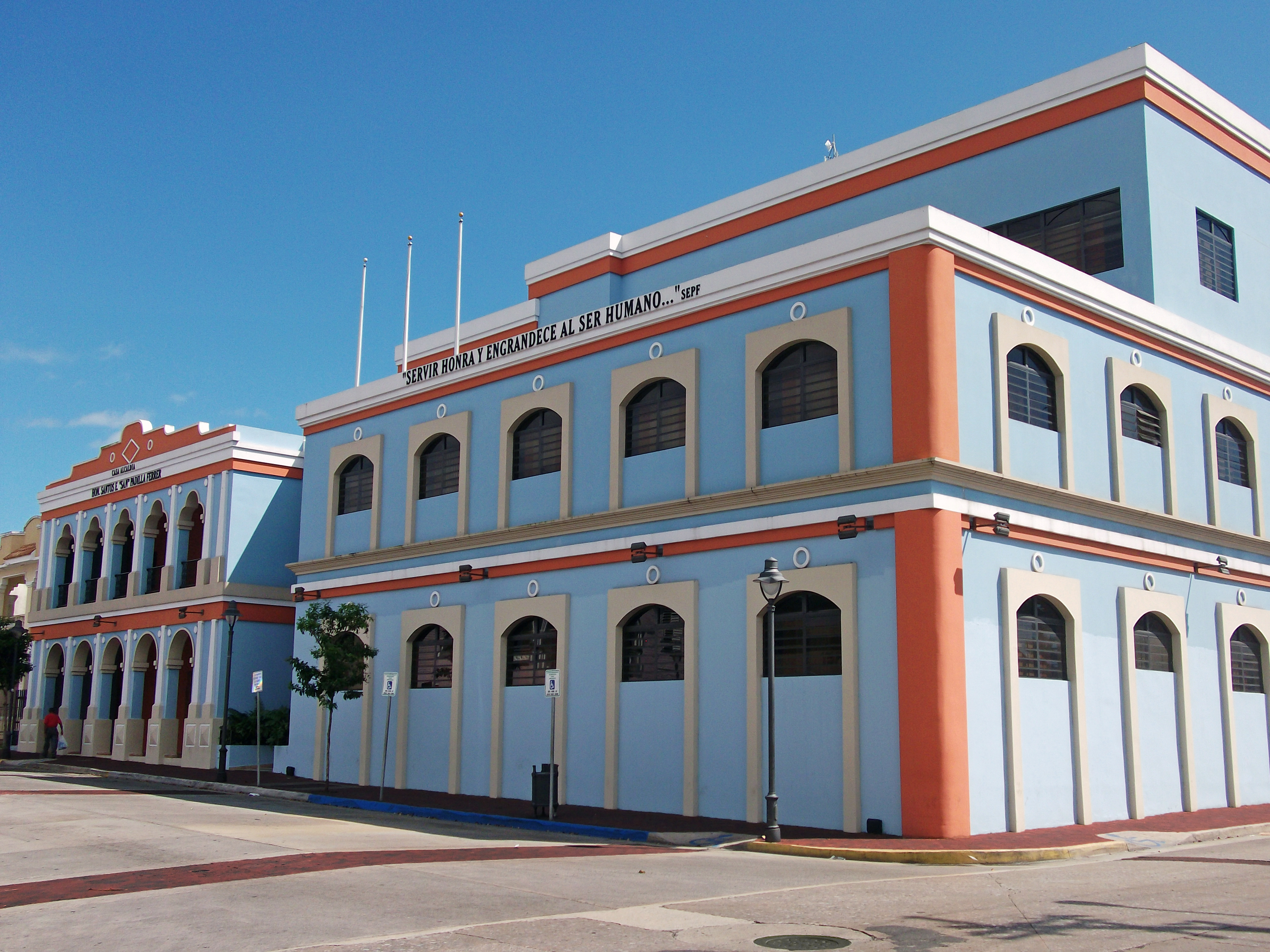
- Town hall and other municipal building of Cabo Rojo

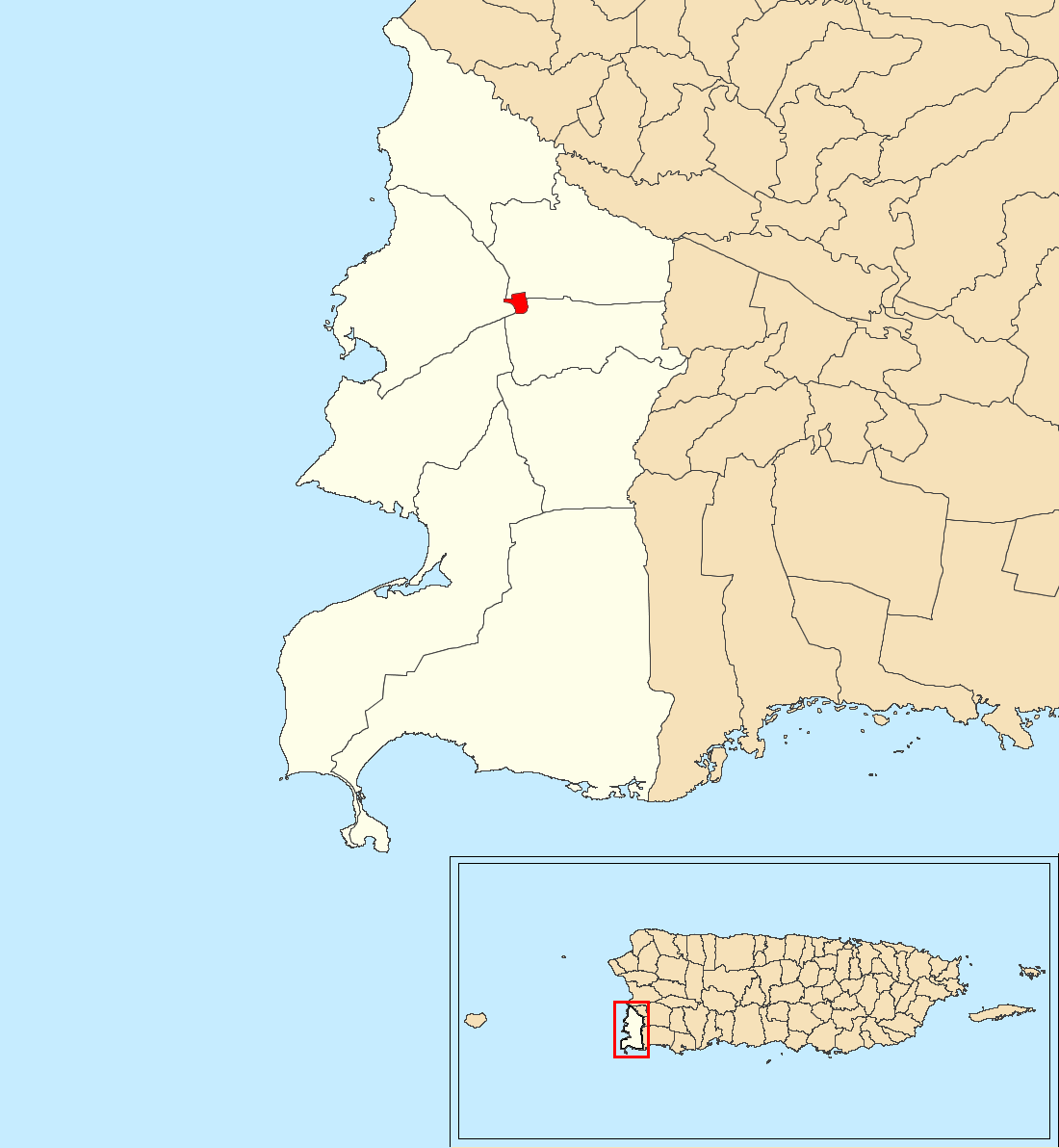
- Location of Cabo Rojo barrio-pueblo within the municipality of Cabo Rojo shown in red

- Location of Puerto Rico
- Coordinates: 18°05′14″N 67°08′48″W
- Commonwealth: Puerto Rico
- Municipality: Cabo Rojo

Area
  - Total: 0.1 sq mi (0.26 km^{2})
  - Land: 0.1 sq mi (0.26 km^{2})
  - Water: 0.0 sq mi (0 km^{2})
- Elevation: 66 ft (20 m)

Population (2010)
  - Total: 1,078
  - Density: 7,450/sq mi (2,880/km^{2})
- Source: 2010 Census
- Time zone: UTC−4 (AST)
- ZIP code: 00623

Cabo Rojo barrio-pueblo is a barrio and the administrative center (seat) of Cabo Rojo, a municipality of Puerto Rico. Its population in 2010 was 1,078.

As was customary in Spain, the municipality in Puerto Rico has a barrio called pueblo which contains a central plaza, the municipal buildings (city hall), and a Catholic church. Fiestas patronales (patron saint festivals) are held in the central plaza every year.

== The central plaza and its church ==
The central plaza, or square, is a place for official and unofficial recreational events and a place where people can gather and socialize from dusk to dawn. The Laws of the Indies, Spanish law, which regulated life in Puerto Rico in the early 19th century, stated the plaza's purpose was for "the parties" (celebrations, festivities) (Spanish: a propósito para las fiestas), and that the square should be proportionally large enough for the number of neighbors (Spanish: grandeza proporcionada al número de vecinos). These Spanish regulations also stated that the streets nearby should be comfortable portals for passersby, protecting them from the elements: sun and rain.

Located across from the central plaza in Cabo Rojo barrio-pueblo is the Parroquia San Miguel Arcángel which was built between 1771 and 1783. Partly destroyed by lightning in 1861, the roof was rebuilt. Its current facade was designed by Onofre Llompart and its construction began in 1878. In 1965, the roof was changed as well as the church interior.

== History ==
Cabo Rojo barrio-pueblo was in Spain's gazetteers until Puerto Rico was ceded by Spain in the aftermath of the Spanish–American War under the terms of the Treaty of Paris of 1898 and became an unincorporated territory of the United States. In 1899, the United States Department of War conducted a census of Puerto Rico finding that the population of Cabo Rojo Pueblo was 2,744.

Historical population
Census	Pop.	Note	%±
1900	2,744		—
1910	3,847		40.2%
1920	4,327		12.5%
1930	4,605		6.4%
1940	5,303		15.2%
1950	4,797		−9.5%
1960	3,086		−35.7%
1970	0		−100.0%
1980	1,917		—
1990	1,527		−20.3%
2000	1,305		−14.5%
2010	1,078		−17.4%
U.S. Decennial Census; 1899 (shown as 1900) 1910-1930; 1930-1950 1980-2000 2010

In July 2020, Federal Emergency Management Agency appropriated funds for repairs to Cabo Rojo's plaza.

== Gallery ==
Places in Cabo Rojo barrio-pueblo:

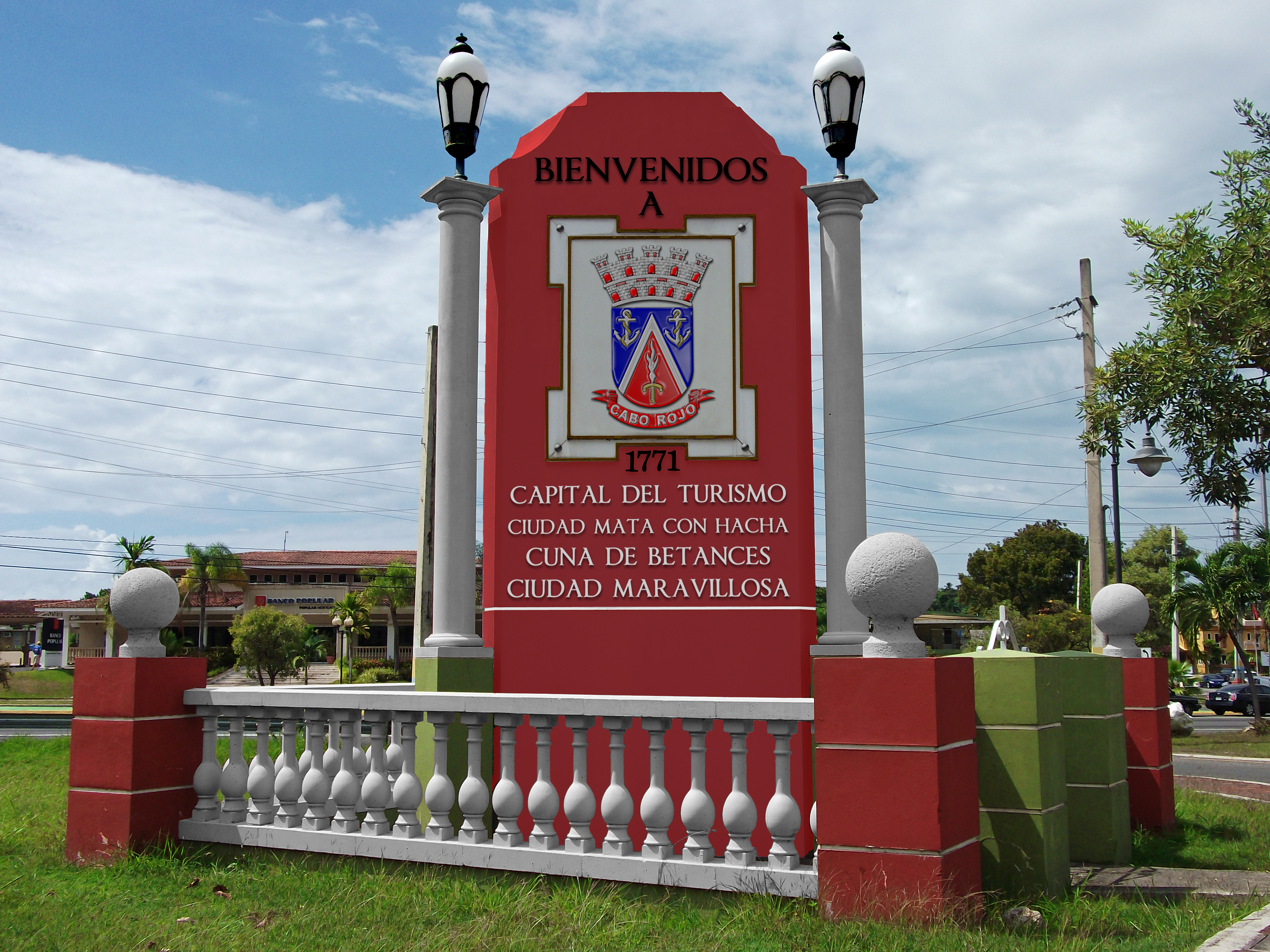
Welcome to Cabo Rojo monument

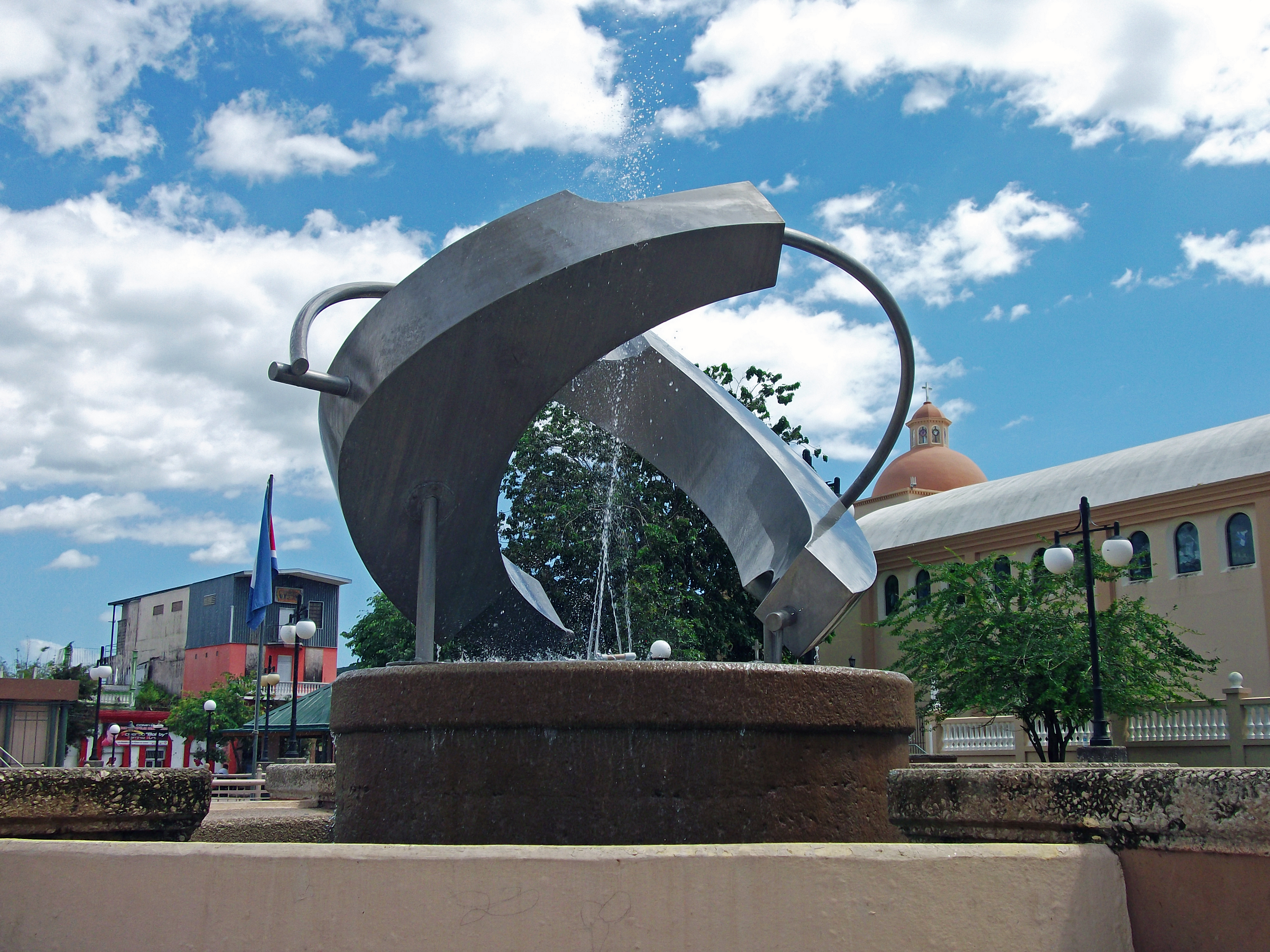
Fountain in the Cabo Rojo plaza (plaza de recreo)

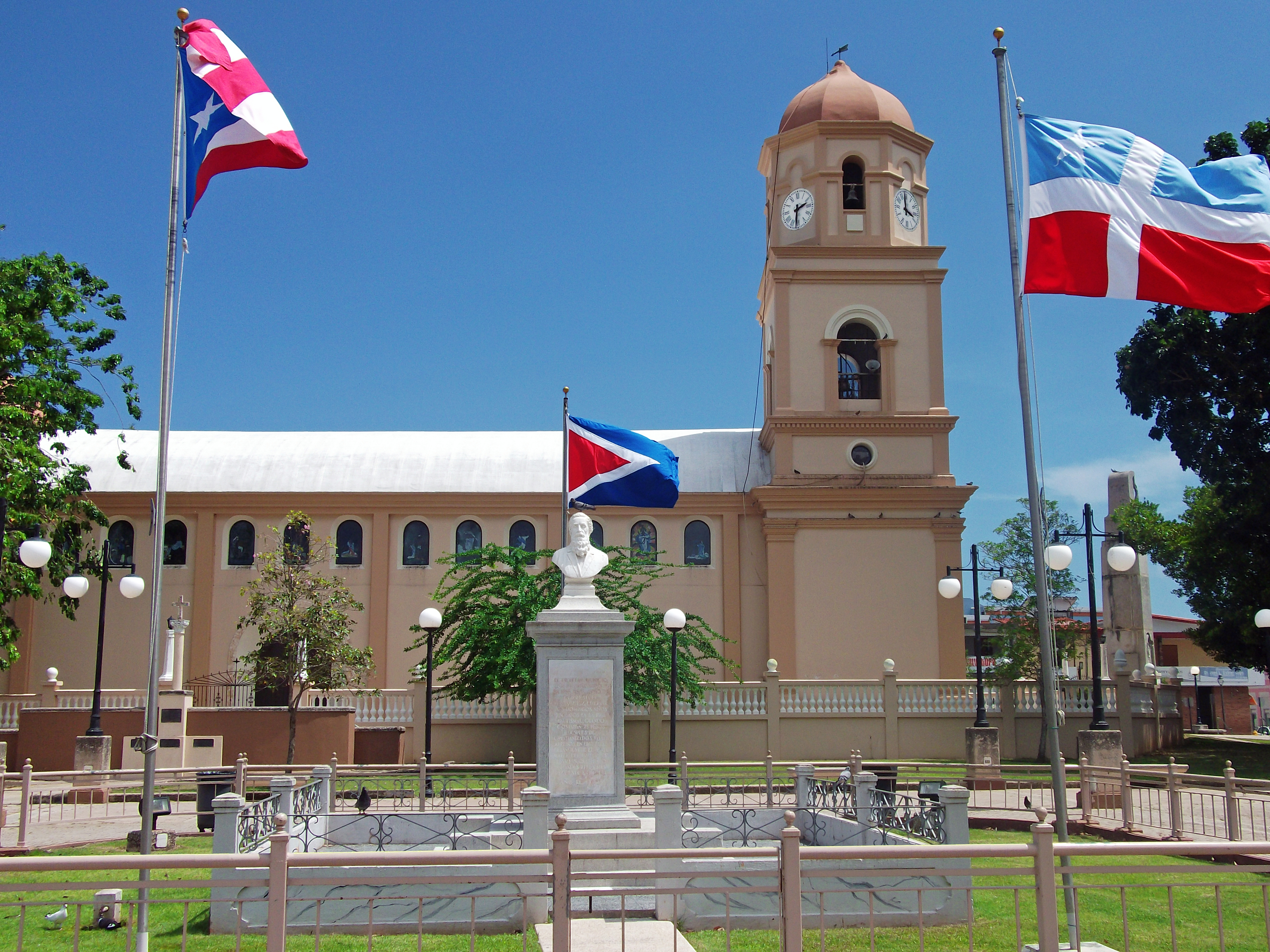
Statue of Ramón Emeterio Betances and Catholic church

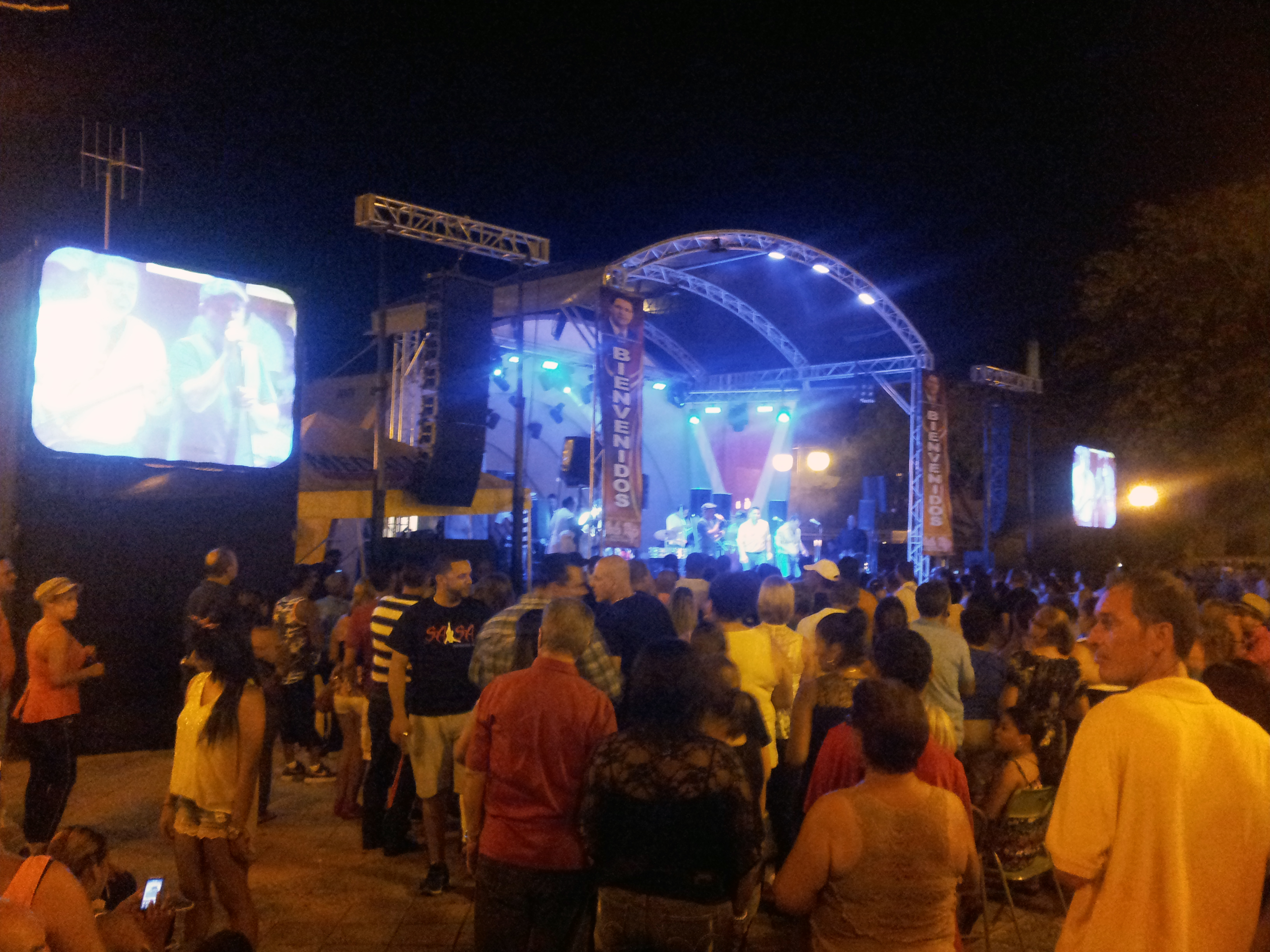
Patron Saint festival in Cabo Rojo

== See also ==
- List of communities in Puerto Rico
