= Caborrojeños Pro Salud y Ambiente =

Environmental organization based in Puerto Rico

Caborrojeños Pro Salud y Ambiente, Inc. (CPSA, Caborrojeños for Health and Environment) is a non-profit environmentalist organization based in Cabo Rojo, Puerto Rico.

The organization was founded in 1990 by a group of concerned residents who wanted to improve the livings standards of Cabo Rojo and Puerto Rico in general, and was incorporated as a non-profit in 1991. The organization's first president and main driving force was Efrén Pérez Rivera, an ecologist and retired professor of the University of Puerto Rico at Mayagüez. The organization partnered with the US Fish & Wildlife Service to preserve and manage the Cabo Rojo Salt Flats.

CPSA promotes efforts to preserve the indigenous flora and fauna of the Cabo Rojo area. The organization created and manages the Centro Interpretativo, a visitors' center in the Salinas area, near the Los Morrillos Lighthouse. Volunteers at the Centro Interpretativo provide guided walking tours that allow visitors to experience the local wildlife and fauna. CPSA collaborated with Walmart on the Sowing the Development of the Country (SDE) Project before withdrawing in 2008.

The group was also actively involved in the preservation of Isla de Ratones (Mice Island), a small island off the coast of Cabo Rojo. The island has been suffering from significant erosion during the past decades. Caborrojeños Pro Salud y Ambiente, with the help of the local government, planted mangroves and launched a project to repopulate the local coral population in order to stop the erosion.

The group was part of the alliance of environmental groups that fought the installation the carbon power station Cogentrix.

Caborrojeños Pro Salud y Ambiente was actively involved in the reconstruction effort of the Los Morrillos Lighthouse, achieving a grant from the U.S. Federal government to restore the historic building. However, political moves and the inactivity of Cabo Rojo mayor Santos Padilla doomed the plan and the federal grant was lost.

In 1999, the group received the Urban Community Award, presented by the Puerto Rico Forestry Conference Annual Convention. In 2003, the organization was awarded the Environmental Protection Agency Environmental Quality Award The group was also recognized by the Miranda Foundation.

The current president is retired college professor Dr. Pedro Valle Carlo.
