= Isla de Ratones =

Isla de Ratones may refer to:

- Isla de Ratones (Cabo Rojo, Puerto Rico), an islet in Cabo Rojo, Puerto Rico
- Isla de Ratones (Ponce, Puerto Rico), an islet in Ponce, Puerto Rico
