= Rebekah Colberg =

Puerto Rican basketball player

- Rebekah Colberg

Medal record

Representing Puerto Rico

Central American and Caribbean Games

Women's athletics
Gold medal – first place	1938 Panama	Discus
Gold medal – first place	1938 Panama	Javelin throw

Women's softball
Gold medal – first place	1946 Barranquilla	softball

Dr. Rebekah Colberg Cabrera (December 25, 1918 – July 8, 1985), (Note: Dates of birth and death were provided and confirmed by the Puerto Rico Olympic Committee-August 24, 2010) was a Puerto Rican athlete, who was known as "The Mother of Women's Sports in Puerto Rico". Colberg participated in various athletic competitions in the 1938 Central American and Caribbean Games celebrated in Panama where she won the gold medals in Discus and Javelin throw.

== Early years ==
Rebekah Colberg Cabrera was born on December 25, 1918, in Cabo Rojo, Puerto Rico to Vicente Lupercio Colberg Pabón, a pharmacy technician, and María Providencia Cabrera Ramírez de Arellano, a housewife. Her great-great-grandmother was the sister of the early-19th century Puerto Rican pirate Roberto Cofresí Ramírez de Arellano. Colberg was born two months premature when her mother was just seven months pregnant. Colberg, whose birth weight was only four pounds during birth, would later break sports barriers for Puerto Rican women. Even though there used to be a lot of discrimination in sports against women, Colberg was to prove that women did have the potential to be great athletes, if given the chance.

Colberg graduated from the University of Puerto Rico with a bachelor's degree in science and pharmacy. She received her Masters in physical education from Columbia University in New York and her Doctorate in medicine from the National Autonomous University of Mexico (UNAM).

== Sports accomplishments ==
From 1932 to 1946, for fourteen consecutive years, Colberg was Puerto Rico's tennis champion. In 1938, she won two gold medals at the IV Central American and Caribbean Games, celebrated in Panama, in the discus and javelin throw events. In 1946, when the games were celebrated in Barranquilla, Colombia, she won a gold medal in softball. While studying for her master's degree at Columbia University, she was in the university's field hockey and lacrosse championship teams. She was also a member of the undefeated women's basketball team of the National Autonomous University of Mexico.

== Later years ==
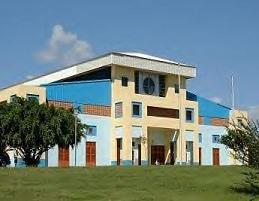
Coliseo Rebekah Colberg

In 1952, Colberg was inducted into the Puerto Rican Athletic Hall of Fame and the Puerto Rican Tennis Hall of Fame. She is considered by many as the greatest woman athlete to have been born in Puerto Rico. Her cousin, the late Severo Colberg Ramirez, was the Speaker of the Puerto Rico House of Representatives (Cámara de Representantes) from 1982 to 1985. Colberg died on July 8, 1985, in her native town and is buried in the Old San Juan Cemetery, Cementerio Santa Maria Magdalena de Pazzis.

== Honors ==
The City of Cabo Rojo honored Colberg's memory by naming a Coliseum after her (which became, in 1989, the home of what was Cabo Rojo's BSN team), and in Rio Piedras there is also a Rebekah Colberg Multi-sports Gym.

On May 29, 2014, The Legislative Assembly of Puerto Rico honored 12 illustrious women with plaques in the "La Plaza en Honor a la Mujer Puertorriqueña" (Plaza in Honor of Puerto Rican Women) in San Juan. According to the plaques the following 12 women, who by virtue of their merits and legacies, stand out in the history of Puerto Rico. Colberg was among those who were honored.

== See also ==
- List of Puerto Ricans
- History of women in Puerto Rico
- Sports in Puerto Rico
