= Coliseo Rebekah Colberg Cabrera =

Indoor arena in Cabo Rojo, Puerto Rico

- La Rebekah
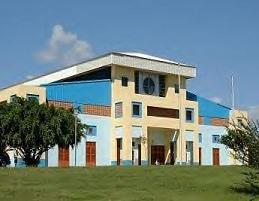
- Front view of the Rebekah Colberg Cabrera Coliseum
- Interactive map of Coliseo Rebekah Colberg Cabrera
- Full name: Coliseo Rebekah Colberg Cabrera
- Location: Hwy 312, Int. 0.5 Km. 0.5 Int., El Campito, Cabo Rojo, Puerto Rico
- Coordinates: 18.0806°N 67.147°W
- Capacity: 2737

Construction
- Opened: 1988

Tenants
- Tainos de Cabo Rojo, BSN Indias de Mayagüez, LVSF

The Rebekah Colberg Cabrera Coliseum (Spanish: Coliseo Rebekah Colberg Cabrera), named in honor of Rebekah Colberg, is an indoor arena in Puerto Rico dedicated to entertainment and sports. It is located at Cabo Rojo, Puerto Rico.

Among many Sports activities held in this venue:

- Community Basketball.
- World's Best 10K, track & field.
- Indias de Mayagüez 2009 season, Liga de Voleibol Superior Femenino.
- NBA Basketball Sin Fronteras.
- World Wrestling Council Shows
- Fencing events at the 2010 Central American and Caribbean Games.

== Gallery ==
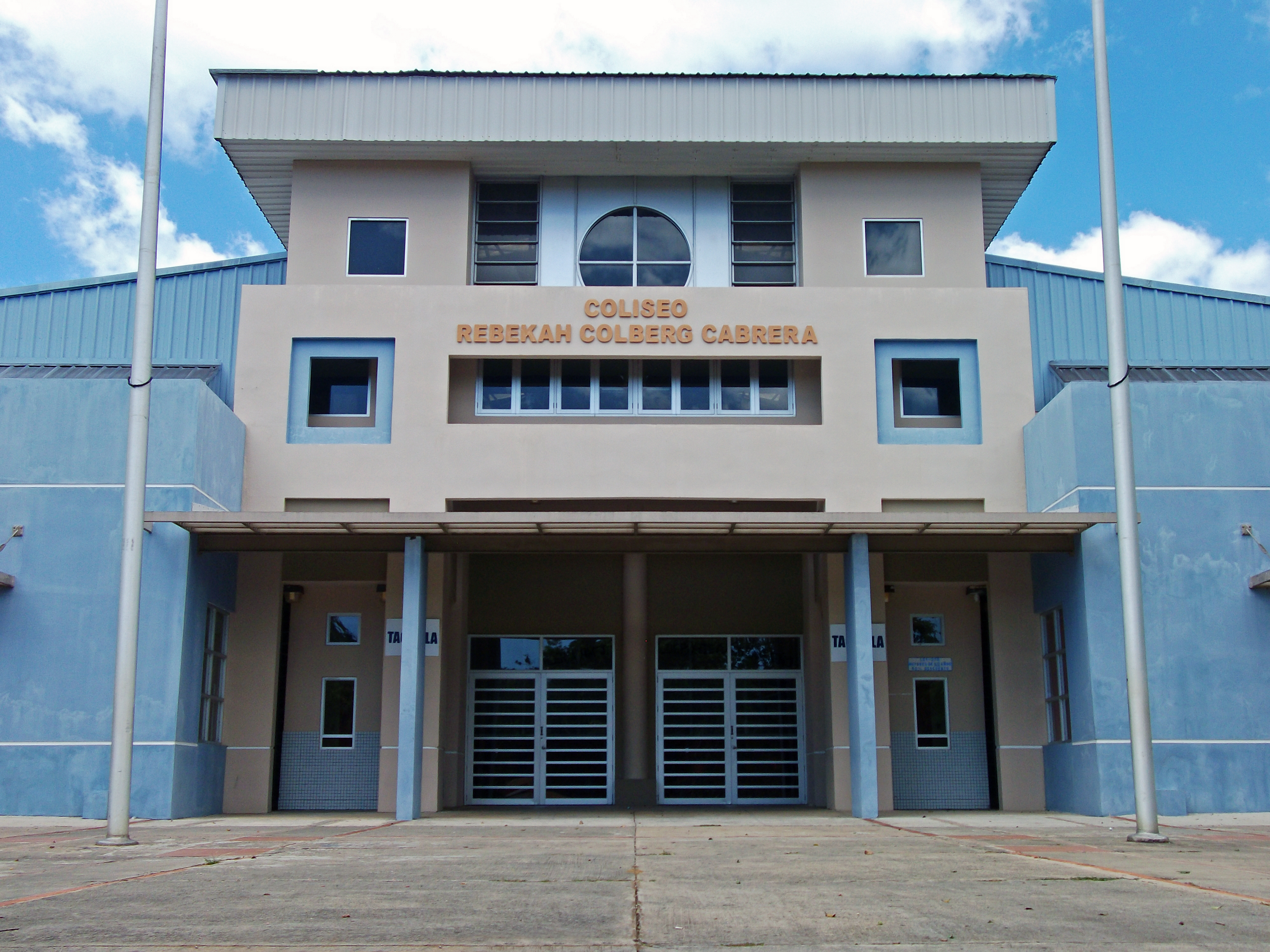
Coliseo Rebekah Colberg
