= Bajura, Cabo Rojo, Puerto Rico =

Barrio of Puerto Rico

Bajura
- Barrio
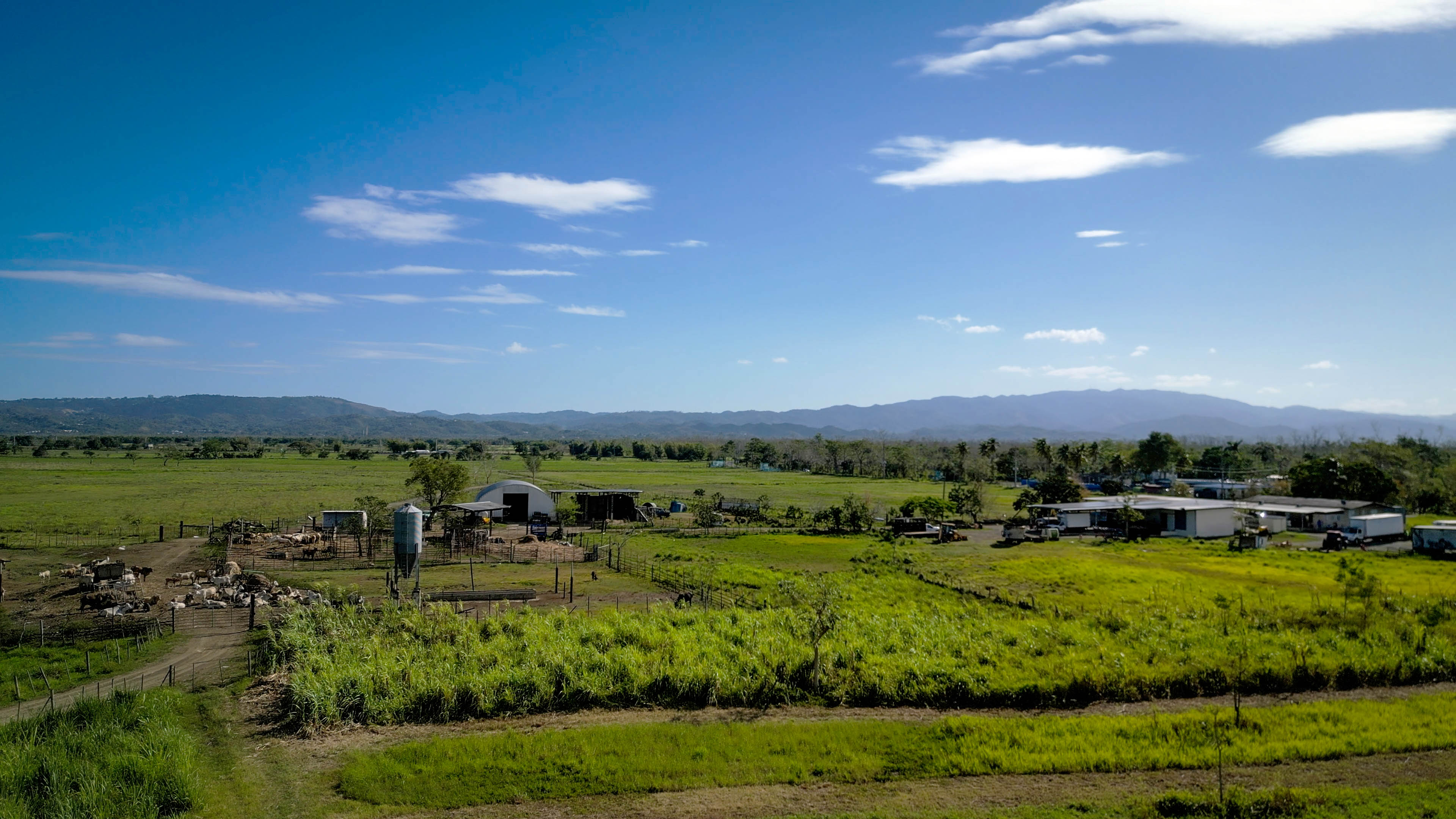
- Farms in Bajura

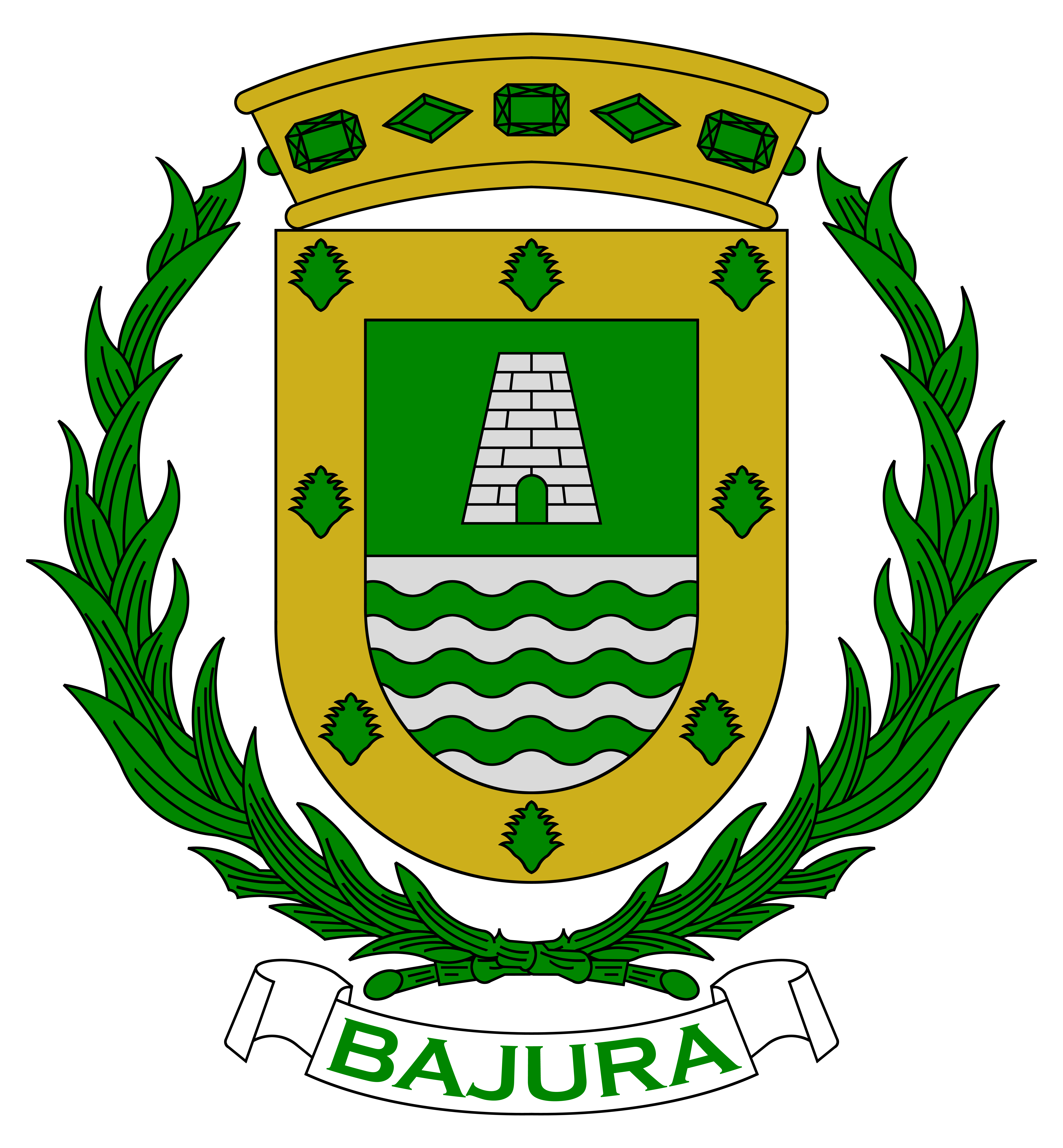
- Flag Seal

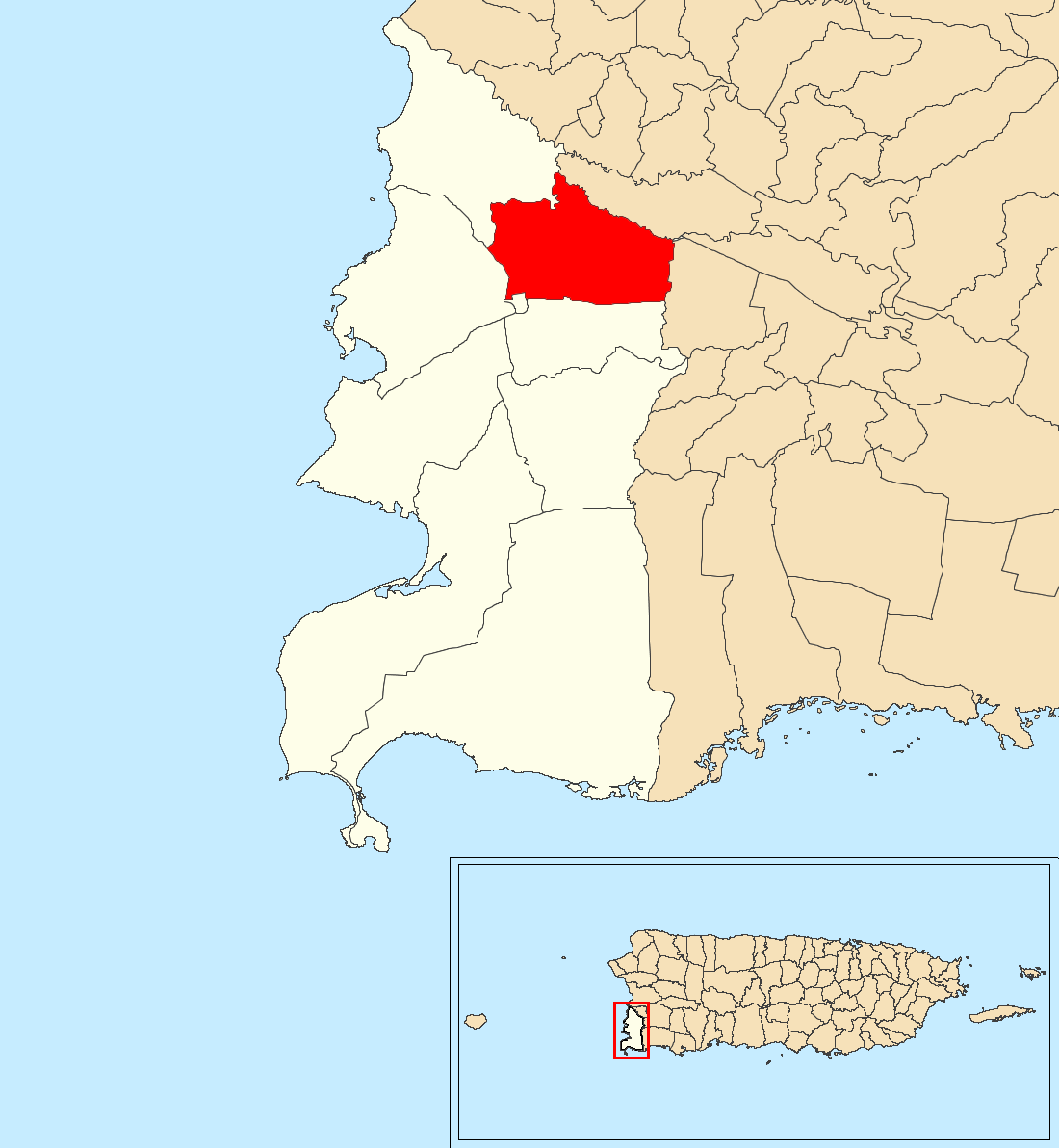
- Location of Bajura within the municipality of Cabo Rojo shown in red

- Location of Puerto Rico
- Coordinates: 18°06′25″N 67°07′59″W
- Commonwealth: Puerto Rico
- Municipality: Cabo Rojo

Area
  - Total: 5.82 sq mi (15.1 km^{2})
  - Land: 5.80 sq mi (15.0 km^{2})
  - Water: 0.02 sq mi (0.052 km^{2})
- Elevation: 33 ft (10 m)

Population (2010)
  - Total: 2,423
  - Density: 190/sq mi (73/km^{2})
- Source: 2010 Census
- Time zone: UTC−4 (AST)

Bajura, known locally as La Bajura, is a barrio in the municipality of Cabo Rojo, Puerto Rico. Its population in 2010 was 2,493.

== History ==
Bajura was in Spain's gazetteers until Puerto Rico was ceded by Spain in the aftermath of the Spanish–American War under the terms of the Treaty of Paris of 1898 and became an unincorporated territory of the United States. In 1899, the United States Department of War conducted a census of Puerto Rico finding that the population of Bajura was 1,218.

Historical population
Census	Pop.	Note	%±
1900	1,218		—
1910	1,337		9.8%
1920	1,471		10.0%
1930	1,922		30.7%
1940	1,888		−1.8%
1950	1,790		−5.2%
1960	1,724		−3.7%
1970	0		−100.0%
1980	2,503		—
1990	2,316		−7.5%
2000	2,364		2.1%
2010	2,423		2.5%
U.S. Decennial Census; 1899 (shown as 1900) 1910-1930; 1930-1950 1980-2000 2010

== See also ==
- List of communities in Puerto Rico
