= Joyuda Lagoon Natural Reserve =

Natural reservoir located in Cabo Rojo, Puerto Rico

Laguna Joyuda
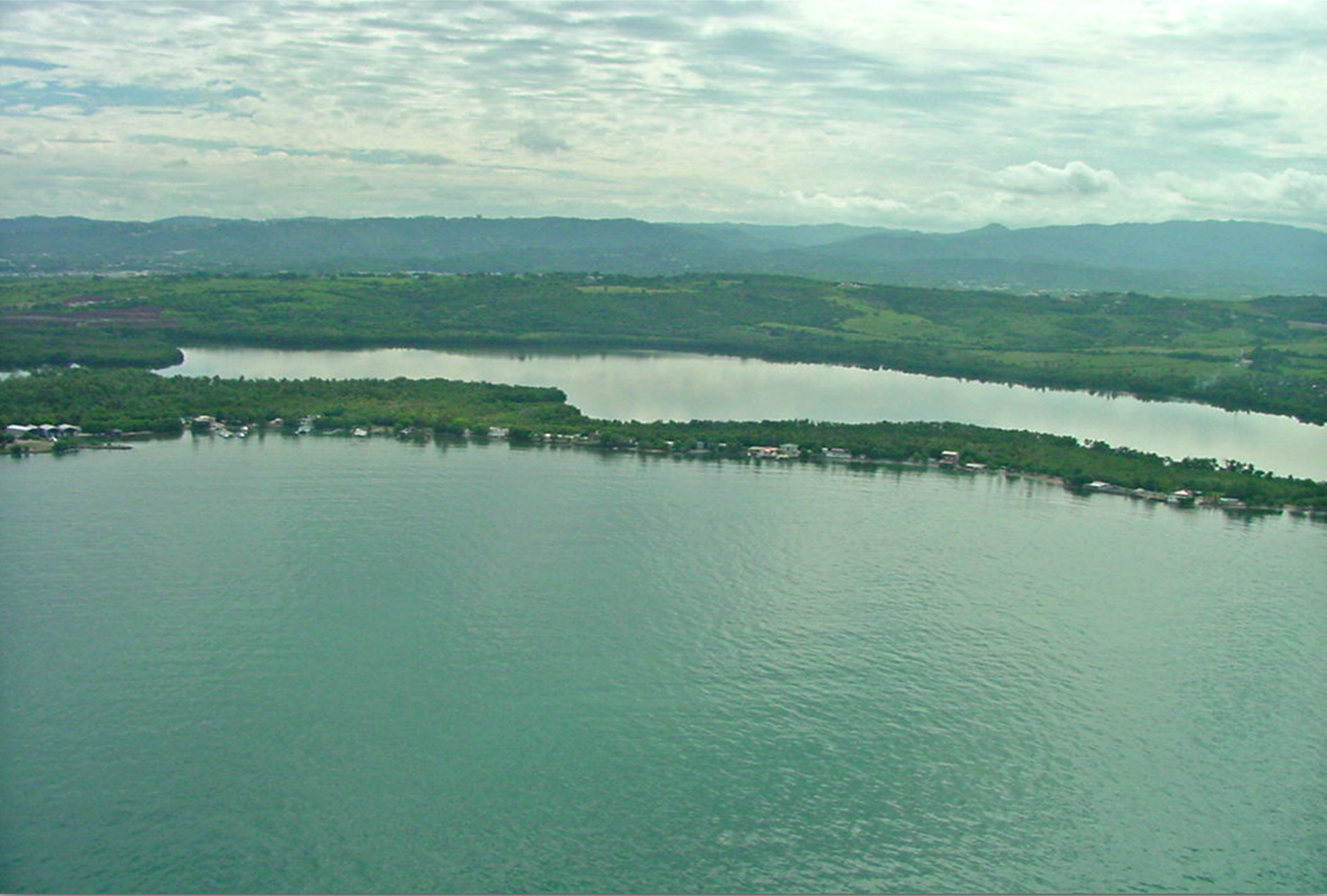
- Laguna Joyuda

- Location within Puerto Rico
- Location: Cabo Rojo, Puerto Rico
- Coordinates: 18°07′50″N 67°10′38″W
- Type: natural reservoir
- Max. length: 2.4 km (1.5 mi)
- Max. width: 1.0 km (0.62 mi)
- Surface area: 1.37 km^{2} (0.53 sq mi)
- Average depth: 1.2 m (3 ft 11 in)

Laguna Joyuda, or Albufera de Joyuda, is a brackish lagoon located in the municipality of Cabo Rojo in Puerto Rico. The only lagoon in the western coast of the main island, it is recognized as a dual system for recreation and fishing. However, it is an area of significant value for its flora, endemic and exotic marine fauna, varied reef systems, and exchange of fauna at the mouth of the Guanajibo River to the north. The neighboring Isla de Ratones and the Punta Ostiones atolls are a refuge for migratory birds and fish. It also serves as a habitat for abundant mollusks and crustaceans in the coast. The lagoon and its environs are protected as the Laguna Joyuda Nature Reserve, a class Ia strict nature reserve as categorized by the International Union for Conservation of Nature.

== Gallery ==
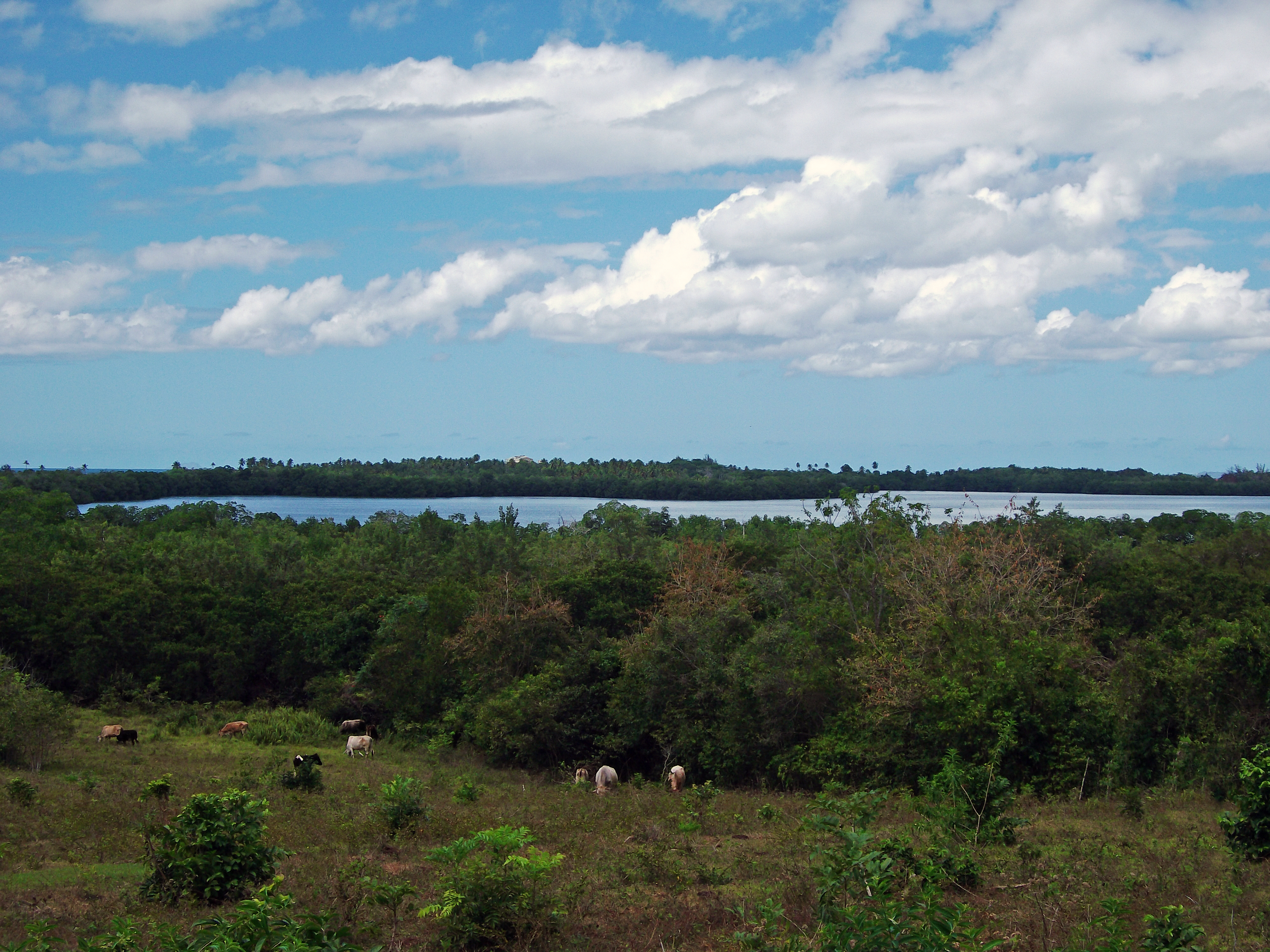
View of the lagoon
