= Punta Ostiones Site =

- Punta Ostiones
- U.S. National Register of Historic Places
- Location: Address restricted
- NRHP reference No.: 04000908
- Added to NRHP: August 25, 2004

Punta Ostiones Site, also known as Ostiones CR-06, is an archaeological site located in or near Punta Ostiones, in the southwestern Puerto Rican municipality of Cabo Rojo, Puerto Rico. Ostiones CR-06 was added to the United States National Register of Historic Places on August 25, 2004, due to being one of the type sites of the Ostionoid culture (600–1500 AD), a Pre-Columbian archaeological culture represented by the Taino people during its latter stages.

The archaeological site consists of a large coastal village, occupied by the Ostionoid culture during the transition period between IIB to III and throughout all of Period III (450–1200 AD). Punta Ostiones deposits have been impacted by natural and cultural processes, nevertheless the site still possess the integrity aspects of location, design, materials and association.
