= Santos Padilla Ferrer =

Puerto Rican mayor

Mayor of Cabo Rojo
- In office January 14, 1997 – August 4, 2007
- Preceded by: Santos Ortíz Ruiz
- Succeeded by: Perza Rodríguez

Personal details
- Born: February 26, 1957 Mayagüez, Puerto Rico
- Died: August 4, 2007 (aged 50) Cabo Rojo, Puerto Rico
- Party: New Progressive Party (PNP)
- Education: University of Puerto Rico at Mayagüez (BBA)

Santos "San" Padilla Ferrer (February 26, 1957 – August 4, 2007) was a Puerto Rican politician and mayor of the city of Cabo Rojo, Puerto Rico.

Padilla was a member of the New Progressive Party of Puerto Rico (Partido Nuevo Progresista de Puerto Rico), or PNP. The party and its members support statehood for Puerto Rico within the United States.

Graduated from Luis Muñoz Marín High School in Cabo Rojo. Went to earn a Bachelor's Degree in Business from the University of Puerto Rico at Mayagüez and degrees leading to a Master's Degree in Business Administration from the Interamerican University of Puerto Rico San Germán campus.

Padilla died following a massive heart attack on August 4, 2007, in Cabo Rojo. The governor of Puerto Rico, Aníbal Acevedo Vilá, declared three days of national mourning.
