= San Miguel Arcángel Church (Cabo Rojo) =

Historic church in Cabo Rojo, Puerto Rico

Coordinates: 18°5′12.36″N 67°8′45.61″W

Iglesia San Miguel Arcángel
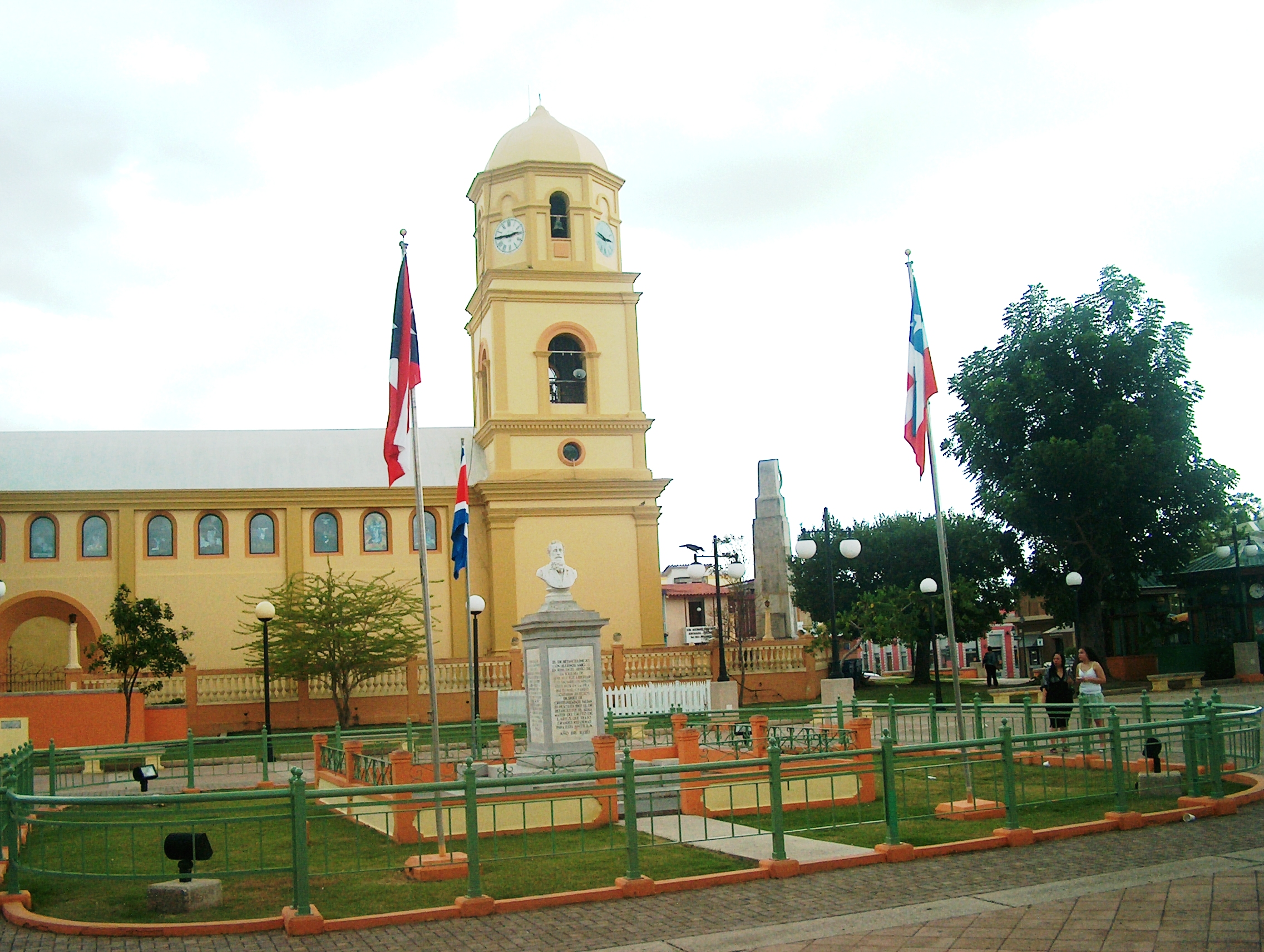

Religion
- Affiliation: Roman Catholic
- Diocese: Roman Catholic Diocese of Mayagüez
- Ecclesiastical or organisational status: Church
- Year consecrated: 1783

Location
- Location: Cabo Rojo, Puerto Rico
- Interactive map of Iglesia San Miguel Arcángel

Architecture
- Architect: First Construction: Unknown
- Style: Neoclassical
- Groundbreaking: 1773
- Completed: 1783

Iglesia San Miguel Arcángel is a Roman Catholic parish church located in Cabo Rojo, Puerto Rico. Construction on the building started in 1773 and was completed in 1783. The church's archives holds the birth records of Ramón Emeterio Betances, Salvador Brau, and the pirate Roberto Cofresi.

== History ==
A description of the church from 1843 indicates that it had three naves separated by arches of wood, covered with tiles, with a ceiling vault. In 1927, Father Joe Smith collected funds to build a dome over the altar and repair the sacristy. Father Benito Sánchez gave the task of commissioning a number of additional works, among them, raising the height of the nave an additional ten feet. In 1936, Father Benito died and is the only Augustine priest buried in the church.

To free children from slavery, Ramón Emeterio Betances used to come to the door of the church on Sunday and, as the baby slaves were brought out from their christening ceremonies, he paid twenty five pesos (once baptized the cost for the slaves were doubled at 50 pesos).

In 2004, the church was designated a historic monument by the Puerto Rican government. The church is part of the Roman Catholic Diocese of Mayagüez.

== Gallery ==
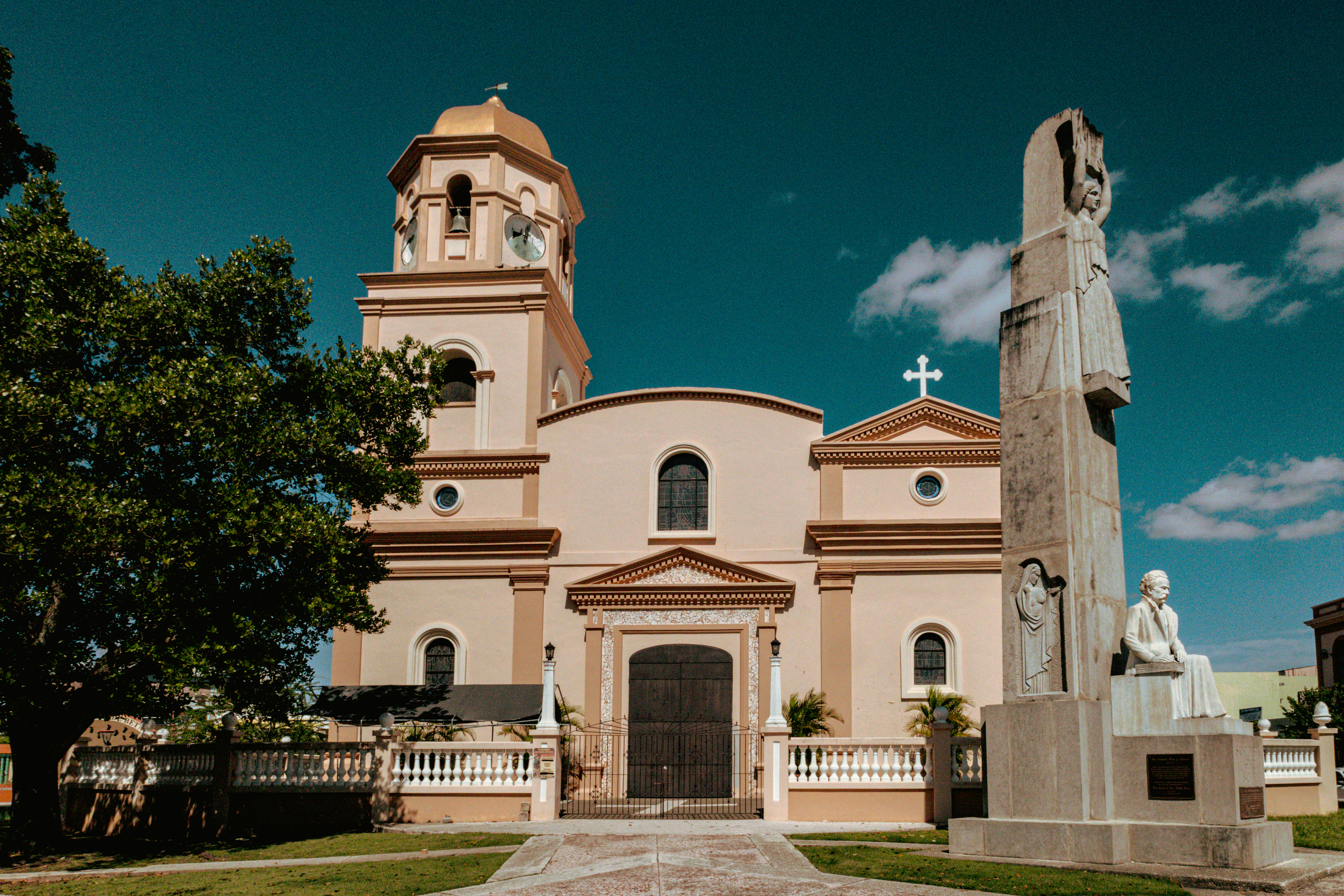
Western façade of the church and Salvador Brau Monument

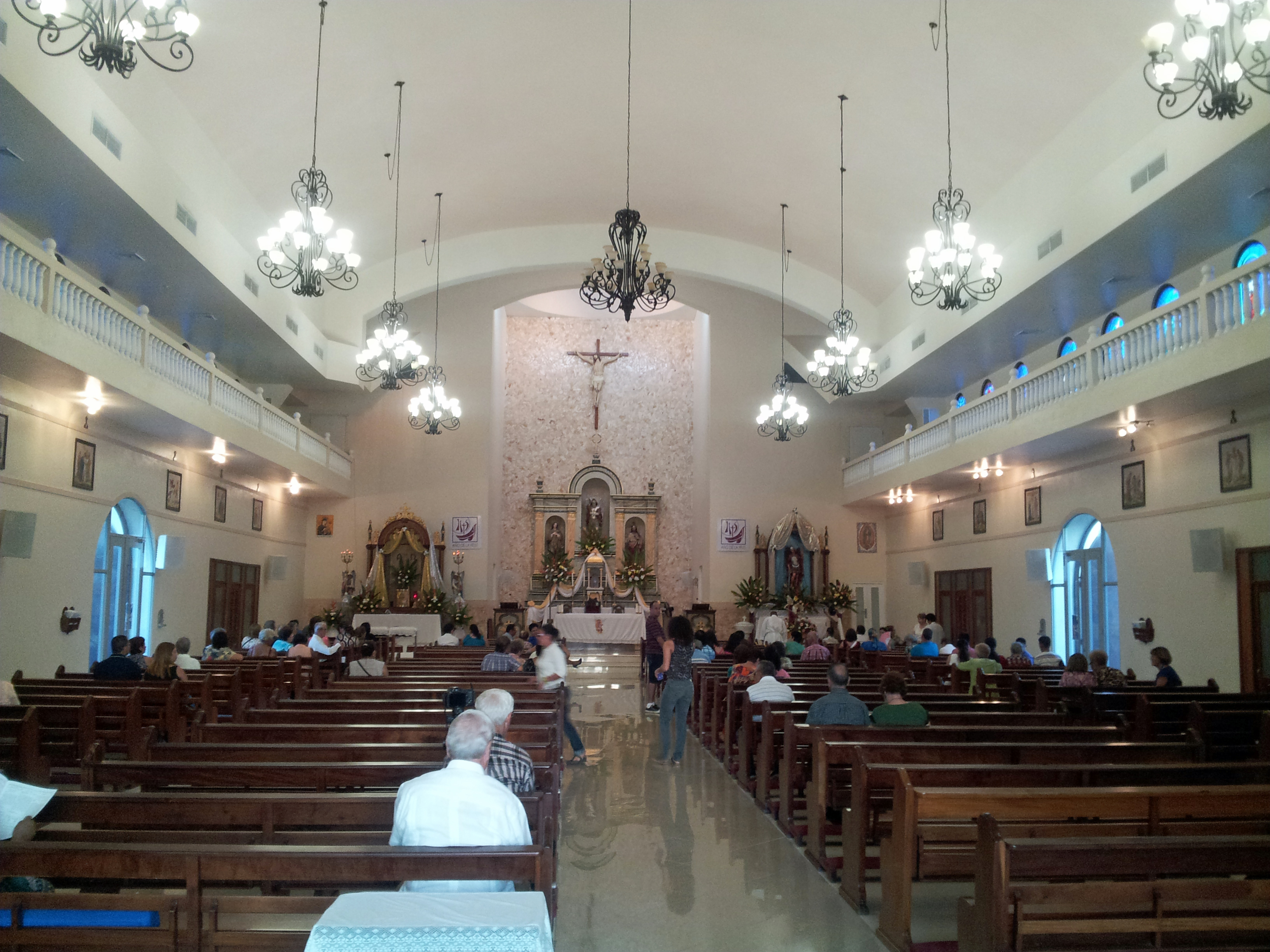
Church interior
