= Cabo Rojo, Puerto Rico =

City and municipality in Puerto Rico

Cabo Rojo Municipio Autónomo de Cabo Rojo
- Municipality
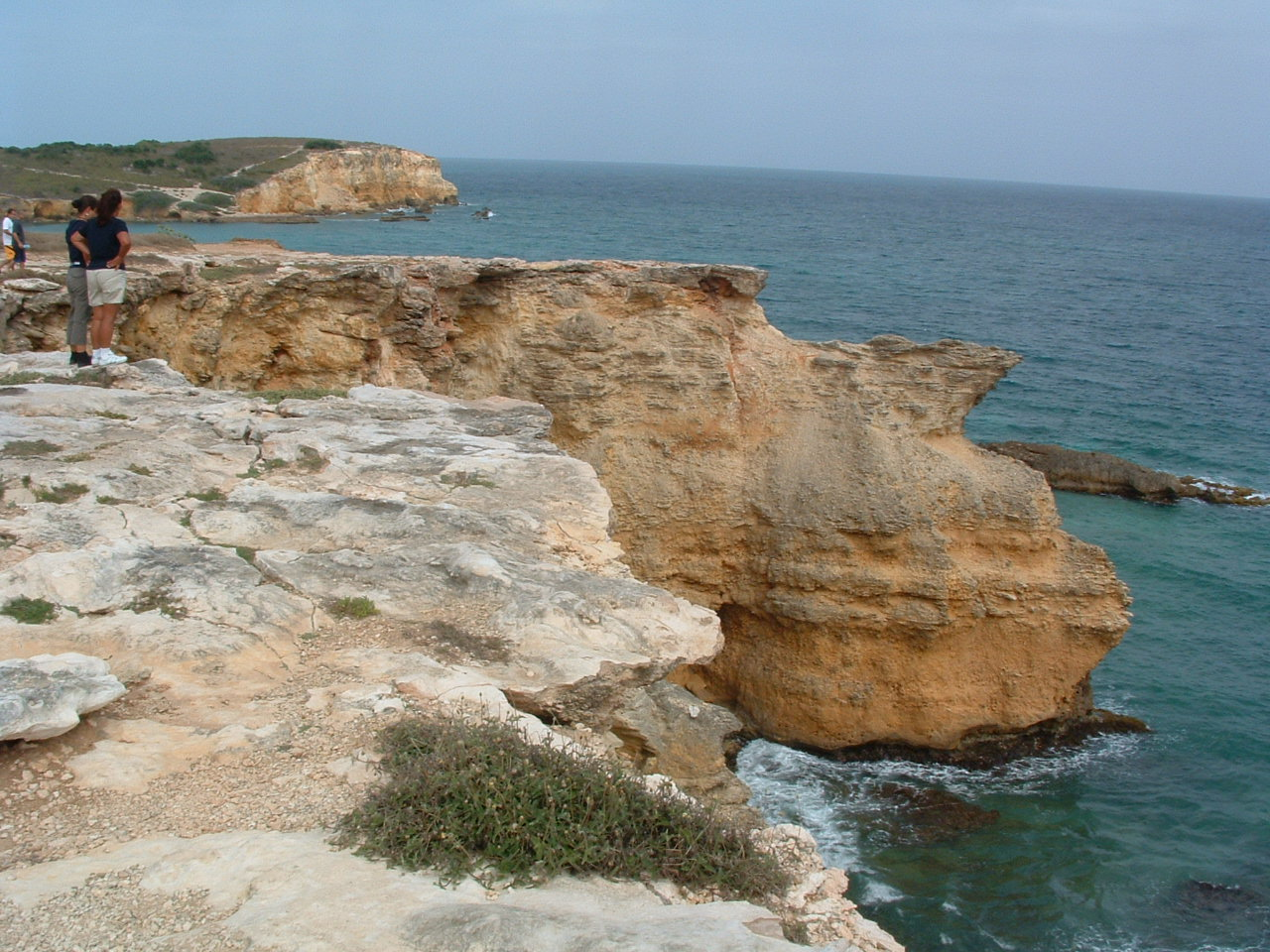
- Limestone cliffs near the Los Morrillos Lighthouse

- Flag Coat of arms
- Nicknames: "Cuna de Cofresí", "Los Mata con Hacha", "Ciudad Maravillosa", "Cuna de Betances", "Capital del Turismo"
- Anthem: "Mi Cabo Rojo Querido"
- Map of Puerto Rico highlighting Cabo Rojo Municipality
- Coordinates: 18°05′12″N 67°08′45″W
- Sovereign state: United States
- Commonwealth: Puerto Rico
- Indigenous settlement: 30 BC – AD 120
- European settlement: early 16th century
- Founded: December 16, 1771
- Founder: Don Nicolás Ramírez de Arellano y Martínez de Matos
- Barrios: 9 barrios: Bajura; Boquerón; Cabo Rojo barrio-pueblo; Guanajibo; Llanos Costa; Llanos Tuna; Miradero; Monte Grande; Pedernales

Government
  - Mayor: Jorge Morales Wiscovitch (PNP)
  - Senatorial dist.: 4 – Mayagüez
  - Representative dist.: 20

Area
  - Municipality: 177.40 sq mi (459.5 km^{2})
  - Land: 70.35 sq mi (182.2 km^{2})
  - Water: 107.05 sq mi (277.3 km^{2})

Population (2020)
  - Municipality: 47,158
  - Estimate (2025): 46,580 ▼
  - Rank: 15th in Puerto Rico
  - Density: 670.3/sq mi (258.8/km^{2})
  - Metro: 136,212
  - CSA: 251,260
- Demonym: Caborrojeños
- Time zone: UTC−4 (AST)
- ZIP Codes: 00623, 00622
- Area code: 787/939
- Website: www.caborojopr.net

Cabo Rojo (Spanish pronunciation: [ˈkaβo ˈroxo], locally [ˈkaβo ˈχoho]) is a city and municipality situated on the southwest coast of Puerto Rico and forms part of the San Germán–Cabo Rojo metropolitan area as well as the larger Mayagüez–San Germán–Cabo Rojo Combined Statistical Area.

== History ==
The area near Las Salinas (salt flats) has been inhabited since 30 BC to 1200 AD according to archaeological evidence. Punta Ostiones, listed in the National Register of Historic Places as an archeological site, was home to a large group of Archaic Indians.

Despite the threat of pirates and natives, the Spanish settled the area of Los Morrillos around 1511. By 1525, salt mining was an important industry in the area. In 1759 the first request to establish itself as a town was denied. Cabo Rojo was founded on December 17, 1771, by Nicolás Ramírez de Arellano, a descendant of Spanish nobility, with the approval of Governor and Captain General Miguel de Muesas. According to Fray Iñigo Abbad y Lasierra, by the end of 1776, Cabo Rojo had a population of 1,215 people.

Cabo Rojo (red cape in English) derives its name from both the reddish color of its salt-flats and the reddish tint that characterizes the seaside cliffs along its southern coast. According to legend, the name was given by Christopher Columbus himself. The first church, founded in 1783, was called San José. The present-day main Catholic church is called San Miguel Arcángel Church located in the town's square.

Puerto Rico was ceded by Spain in the aftermath of the Spanish–American War under the terms of the Treaty of Paris of 1898 and became an unincorporated territory of the United States. On October 18, 1898, formal possession of the island was assumed and the American flag raised over the fortifications from which the emblem of Spain had flown for nearly four centuries.

Hurricane Maria struck Puerto Rico on September 20, 2017, causing large-scale damage and destruction to infrastructure. In Cabo Rojo, around 400 homes lost their roof, and three thousand residents were left without drinking water as a result of Hurricane María. The coastal fishing village of Joyuda was the most impacted area of Cabo Rojo.

== Geography ==
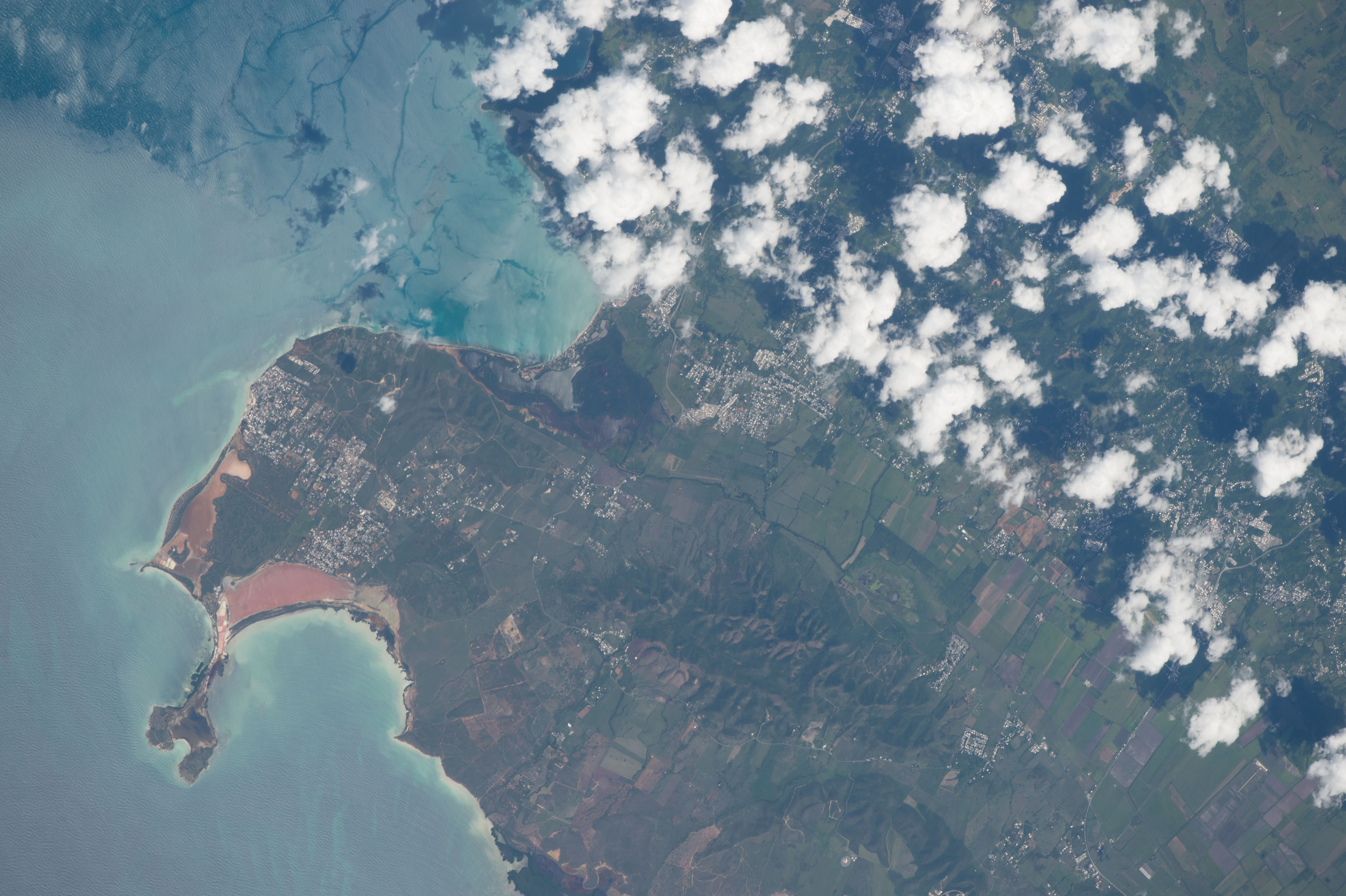
Picture of Cabo Rojo taken during ISS Expedition 53

The municipality of Cabo Rojo lies on the southern-west corner of the island of Puerto Rico, on the Western Coastal Plains. Sierra Bermeja, Puerto Rico's geologically oldest mountain range, crosses the municipality from west to east towards Lajas. It is bordered by Mayagüez and Hormigueros to the north, San Germán and Lajas to the east, the Caribbean Sea to the south and the Mona Passage to the west. Cabo Rojo has a surface area of 72 square miles (187 km^{2}).

Cabo Rojo's terrain is flat, however, some notable peaks are Mariquita, Buena Vista, Cerro Vargas, and Peñones de Melones. The saline deposits at Cabo Rojo are one of the few places in the world where microbial carpets can be found.

=== Barrios ===
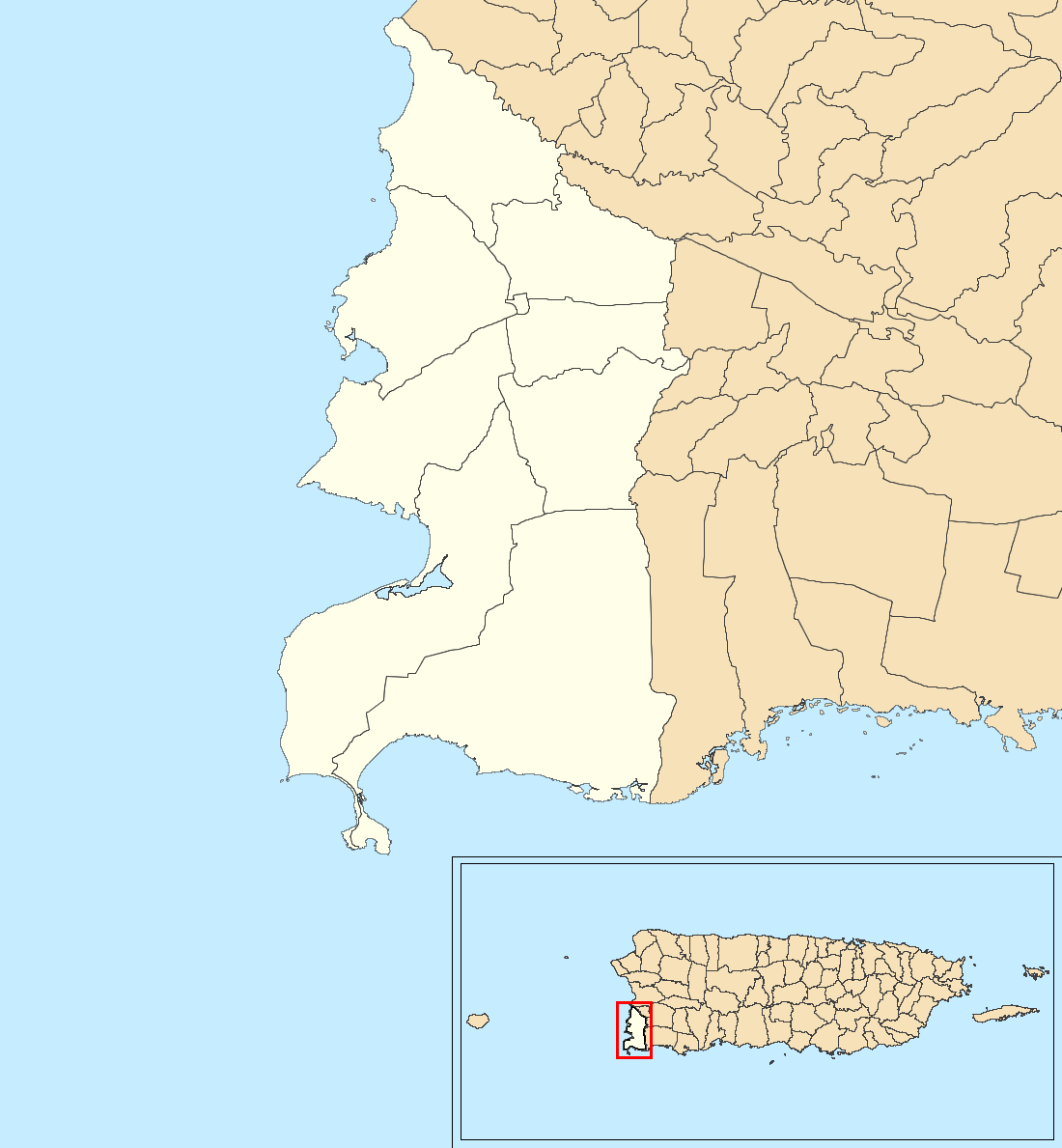
Subdivisions of Cabo Rojo

Like all municipalities of Puerto Rico, Cabo Rojo is subdivided into barrios. The municipal buildings, central square and large Catholic church are located in a small barrio referred to as "el pueblo", near the center of the municipality. Cabo Rojo is a principal municipality of the San Germán–Cabo Rojo metropolitan area as well as the larger Mayagüez–San Germán–Cabo Rojo Combined Statistical Area.

1. Bajura
2. Boquerón
3. Cabo Rojo barrio-pueblo
4. Guanajibo
5. Llanos Costa
6. Llanos Tuna
7. Miradero
8. Monte Grande
9. Pedernales

People from the El Combate community in barrio Boquerón are known as mata con hacha ("those who kill with axes") based on an old folk tale about a fight over the salinas, where those from Cabo Rojo fought with axes against people from the adjacent town of Lajas. The latter apparently fought back by throwing stones and are thus known as tira piedras ("those who throw stones").

=== Sectors ===
Barrios (which are like minor civil divisions) and subbarrios, are further subdivided into smaller areas called sectores (sectors in English). The types of sectores may vary, from normally sector to urbanización to reparto to barriada to residencial, among others.

=== Special Communities ===
Comunidades Especiales de Puerto Rico (Special Communities of Puerto Rico) are marginalized communities whose citizens are experiencing a certain amount of social exclusion. A map shows these communities occur in nearly every municipality of the commonwealth. Of the 742 places that were on the list in 2014, the following barrios, communities, sectors, or neighborhoods were in Cabo Rojo: Ballajá, Colacho, El Fuego y Las Piedras (Guaniquilla), Hoyo Bravo, Las Quebradas en Monte Grande, Pedernales, Puerto Real, and Sector Corozo.

=== Climate ===
Climate data for Cabo Rojo (Averages and Records: 1910–2010)
Month	Jan	Feb	Mar	Apr	May	Jun	Jul	Aug	Sep	Oct	Nov	Dec	Year
Record high °F (°C)	91 (33)	92 (33)	95 (35)	95 (35)	95 (35)	99 (37)	99 (37)	97 (36)	98 (37)	97 (36)	98 (37)	98 (37)	99 (37)
Mean daily maximum °F (°C)	87 (31)	87 (31)	88 (31)	89 (32)	90 (32)	91 (33)	92 (33)	92 (33)	91 (33)	90 (32)	89 (32)	88 (31)	89.5 (31.9)
Daily mean °F (°C)	75 (24)	75 (24)	76 (24)	78 (26)	80 (27)	81 (27)	81 (27)	81 (27)	81 (27)	80 (27)	78 (26)	76 (24)	78.5 (25.8)
Mean daily minimum °F (°C)	62 (17)	62 (17)	64 (18)	66 (19)	69 (21)	71 (22)	70 (21)	70 (21)	70 (21)	69 (21)	67 (19)	63 (17)	66.9 (19.4)
Record low °F (°C)	44 (7)	51 (11)	50 (10)	50 (10)	56 (13)	58 (14)	53 (12)	58 (14)	60 (16)	56 (13)	53 (12)	49 (9)	44 (7)
Average rainfall inches (mm)	2.51 (64)	2.19 (56)	2.19 (56)	3.43 (87)	5.14 (131)	2.70 (69)	3.13 (80)	5.23 (133)	6.20 (157)	7.29 (185)	5.71 (145)	2.33 (59)	48.05 (1,220)
Source: Weather.com

== Demographics ==
In 1899, the United States Department of War conducted a census of Puerto Rico finding that the population of Cabo Rojo was 16,154.

Historical population
Census	Pop.	Note	%±
1900	16,154		—
1910	19,562		21.1%
1920	22,412		14.6%
1930	23,792		6.2%
1940	28,586		20.1%
1950	29,546		3.4%
1960	24,868		−15.8%
1970	26,060		4.8%
1980	34,045		30.6%
1990	38,521		13.1%
2000	46,911		21.8%
2010	50,917		8.5%
2020	47,158		−7.4%
2025 (est.)	46,580	▼	−1.2%
U.S. Decennial Census; 1899 (shown as 1900) 1910–1930; 1930–1950 1960–2000 2010 2020

== Tourism ==
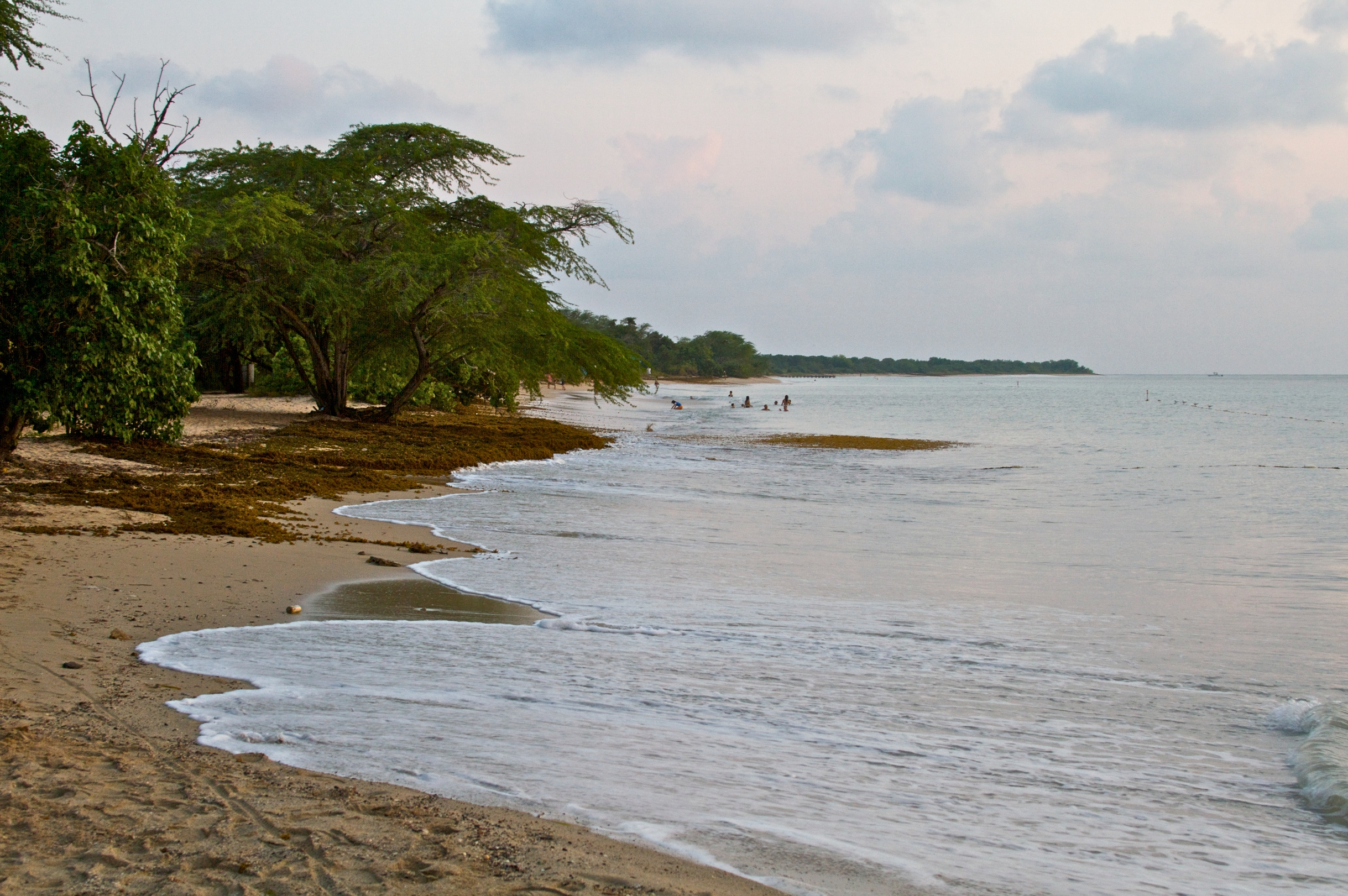
Playa Sucia in Cabo Rojo

There are 127 beaches in Cabo Rojo, including Playa Sucia.

Its tourism industry has flourished with the development of hotels and marinas, but local and international environmentalists are concerned that this development will endanger Cabo Rojo's rich and beautiful beaches, sunsets and natural resources. Cabo Rojo is also well known for its fishing, particularly the Puerto Real fishing village, and its many seafood restaurants, most of which are found in the fishing village of Joyuda.

=== Landmarks and places of interest ===
The San Miguel Arcángel Church, in the main town square, was built between 1773 and 1783. The famous Cabo Rojo lighthouse, Los Morrillos Lighthouse, known by locals as El Faro, was built in 1881 over limestone cliffs that rise 200 feet above sea level. This old lighthouse was automated and electrically charged in 1967 and is considered to have some, if not, the most spectacular ocean views on Puerto Rico's west coast. The lighthouse has undergone recent renovations which has created controversy because of the quality of the work. According to locals and scholars, the internal structure was gutted leaving nothing of historical significance behind.

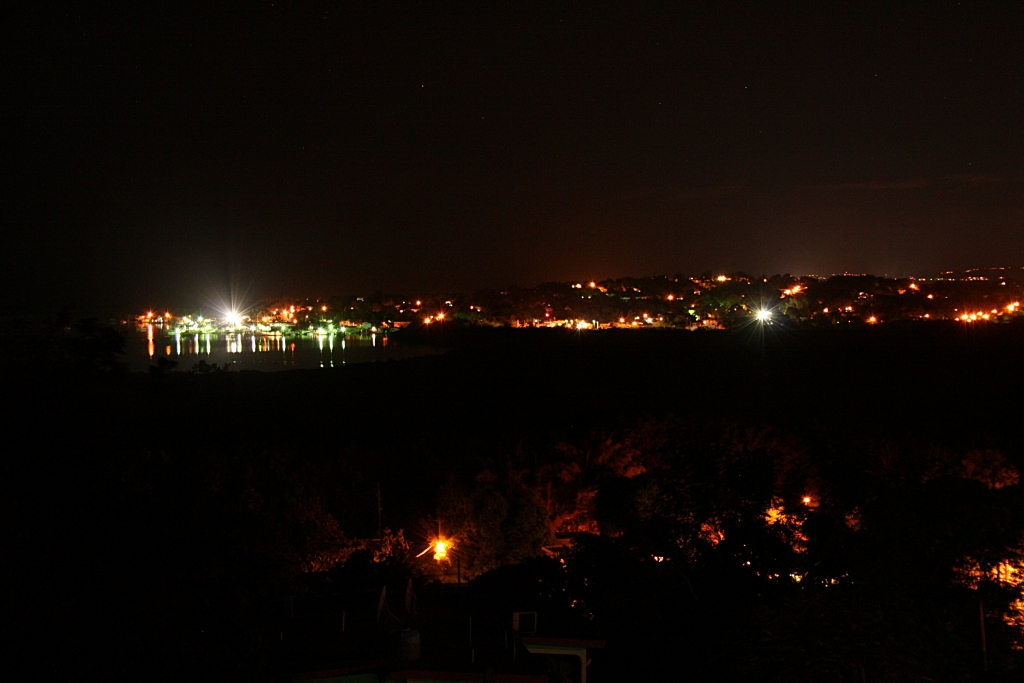
View of Puerto Real in Cabo Rojo at night

The lighthouse is located near the Salinas, or salt mines. These salt mines are reported to be the oldest industry in the New World. Salt has been mined in this site non-stop since the time of the Taínos. Near the Salinas, a local civic group Caborrojeños Pro Salud y Ambiente run a visitor center known as the Centro Interpretativo Las Salinas De Cabo Rojo don Efrén Pérez Rivera. They offer free guided tours of the local area, which is rich in flora and fauna.

- Teatro Excelsior which was built in 1871
- Boquerón Beach
- Cofresí Cave
- El Combate Beach
- Joyuda Beach
- Joyuda Lagoon
- Club Deportivo del Oeste
- Nautical Club
- Punta Arenas Beach
- Puerta Real Beach
- Isla de Ratones
- Buyé Beach
- The Lighthouse (El Faro) Beach
- La Playuela in Los Morrillos (El Faro)
- Guaniquilla Lagoon
- Quebrada Los Chorros

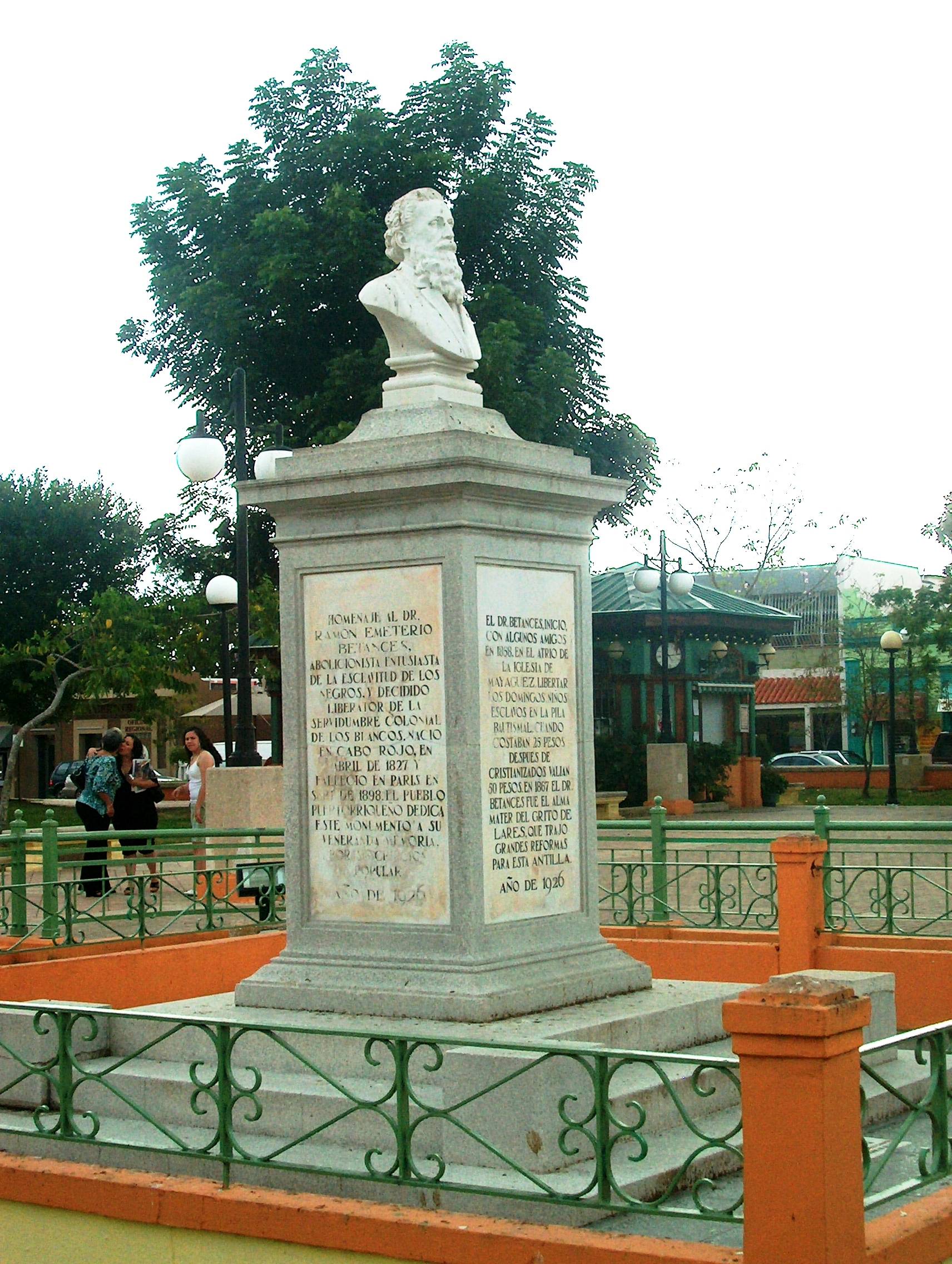
Monument to Ramon Emeterio Betances, 2007. The monument includes inscriptions honoring him on behalf of the Dominican Republic and Cuba. His remains, returned from France in the 1920s, are buried underneath the monument.

To stimulate local tourism during the COVID-19 pandemic in Puerto Rico, the Puerto Rico Tourism Company launched the Voy Turistiendo (I'm Touring) campaign in 2021. The campaign featured a passport book with a page for each municipality. The Voy Turisteando Cabo Rojo passport page lists Faro Los Morrillos, Puente de Piedra, Centro Interpretativo Las Salinas, Hacienda Verde Tahiti (for agritourism), and several beaches including Playuela, Buyé, El Combate, and Boquerón, as places of interest.

== National protected areas ==
- The Cabo Rojo National Wildlife Refuge is home for a number of native bird species including the endangered yellow-shouldered blackbird also known as la mariquita de Puerto Rico or capitán.
- The Boquerón State Forest is one of seven state forests managed by the Puerto Rico Department of Natural and Environmental Resources.

== Culture ==
=== Festivals and events ===
Cabo Rojo celebrates its patron saint festival in September. The Fiestas Patronales de San Miguel Arcangel is a religious and cultural celebration that generally features parades, games, artisans, amusement rides, regional food, and live entertainment. The festival has featured live performances by well-known artists such as El Gran Combo de Puerto Rico, Plena Libre, Kany García, and Cano Estremera.

Other festivals and events celebrated in Cabo Rojo include:

- Pescao Festival – March
- Años Cuarenta Festival – April
- Chigüero Festival – April
- Betances Festival – April
- Oyster Festival – May
- Boquerón Bay Crossing – July
- Watermelon Festival – July
- Retorno a la Arena – July
- La Pileta Festival – December
- Le Lo Lai Festival – December

=== Sports ===
Cabo Rojo had a BSN basketball team, Los Turistas de Cabo Rojo (the "Cabo Rojo Tourists") from 1989 to 1993.

Indias de Mayagüez, female Volleyball team from Liga de Voleibol Superior Femenino played the 2009 season at the Coliseo Rebekah Colberg Cabrera, because their home ground, Palacios de los Deportes, was under remodeling.

== Government ==
All municipalities in Puerto Rico are administered by a mayor, elected every four years. The current mayor of Cabo Rojo is Jorge Morales Wiscovitch, of the New Progressive Party (PNP). He was first elected at the 2020 general elections.

The city belongs to the Puerto Rico Senatorial district IV, which is represented by two Senators. In 2024, Jeison Rosa and Karen Michelle Román Rodríguez were elected as District Senators.

== Symbols ==
The municipio has an official flag and coat of arms.

=== Flag ===
The flag contains elements of the coat of arms, excluding the sword, the anchors and the crown.

=== Coat of arms ===
The point or red triangle symbolizes the "Cabo Bermejo" (Vermillion Cape) in Los Morrillos. The blue and white, with the anchors, represent the sea that "bathes our coasts". The flaming sword, is an attribute to Archangel Saint Michael, the town's patron saint. Finally, the crown, which heightens and distinguishes the shield, stands for the status of Cabo Rojo.

=== Anthem ===
The anthem of Cabo Rojo is a composition with music and lyrics by Carlos Weber Asencio.

== Transportation ==
Although Cabo Rojo lacks an airport, it is approximately 11 miles from the Eugenio María de Hostos Airport (MAZ) in Mayagüez, a commercial airport that serves direct flights to and from San Juan. Cabo Rojo has grown tremendously in the last few years as evidenced by its accreditation as a city. Cabo Rojo's nearest airport servicing international destinations is forty-five minutes away in Aguadilla's Rafael Hernández Airport (BQN). This airport was part of the now deactivated Ramey Air Force Base.

PR-100 is the main highway in the city, connecting northward to PR-2 between Hormigueros and Mayagüez, and southward to the Boquerón sector. Other mayor roads include PR-101, which connects to Lajas, PR-102, connecting to Mayagüez and San Germán, PR-103, an older road which parallels the newer PR-100, and PR-301, connecting to El Combate sector and the Los Morrillos Lighthouse.

There are 20 bridges in Cabo Rojo.

== Notable people ==
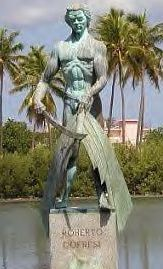
Statue of "El Pirata Roberto Cofresí" in Cabo Rojo

The following is a list of notable Caborrojeños:

- Antonio Fas Alzamora is the longest serving member of the Puerto Rico Legislative Assembly.
- Ramón Emeterio Betances y Alacán (1827–1898) was a nationalist and a medical doctor. He was the primary instigator of the Grito de Lares revolution and, as such, is considered to be the father of the Puerto Rican independence movement and, as well, the Father of the Nation.
- Salvador Brau y Asencio (1842–1912) was a journalist, poet, writer and also a historian.
- Roberto Cofresí y Ramírez de Arellano (1791–1825), better known as "El Pirata Cofresí", was a pirate.
- Elisa Colberg (1903–1988) was the founder of the Puerto Rican Girl Scouts, the first troop of which formed in 1926 in Cabo Rojo.
- Dra. Rebekah Colberg (1918–1985), is known as "The Mother of Women's Sports in Puerto Rico".
- Ramón López Irizarry (1897–1982) was an educator and scientist who invented an easier way to extract the cream from the coconut pulp and developed the original formula of "Coco Lopez"
- Demensio Rivera (1932–1967) was a United States Army veteran of the Korean War who was awarded the Distinguished Service Cross; and whose award was upgraded in 2014, decades after his death, to the Medal of Honor.
- Efrén Pérez Rivera is a former college professor and noted Puerto Rican environmentalist leader.
- Colonel Carlos Betances Ramírez (1910–2001), was the only Puerto Rican to command a Battalion in the Korean War.
- Emiliano Mercado del Toro (1891-2007), supercentenarian who was once the oldest living man in the world from 2004 until his death and also the oldest living person in the world from 2006 until his death

== Gallery ==
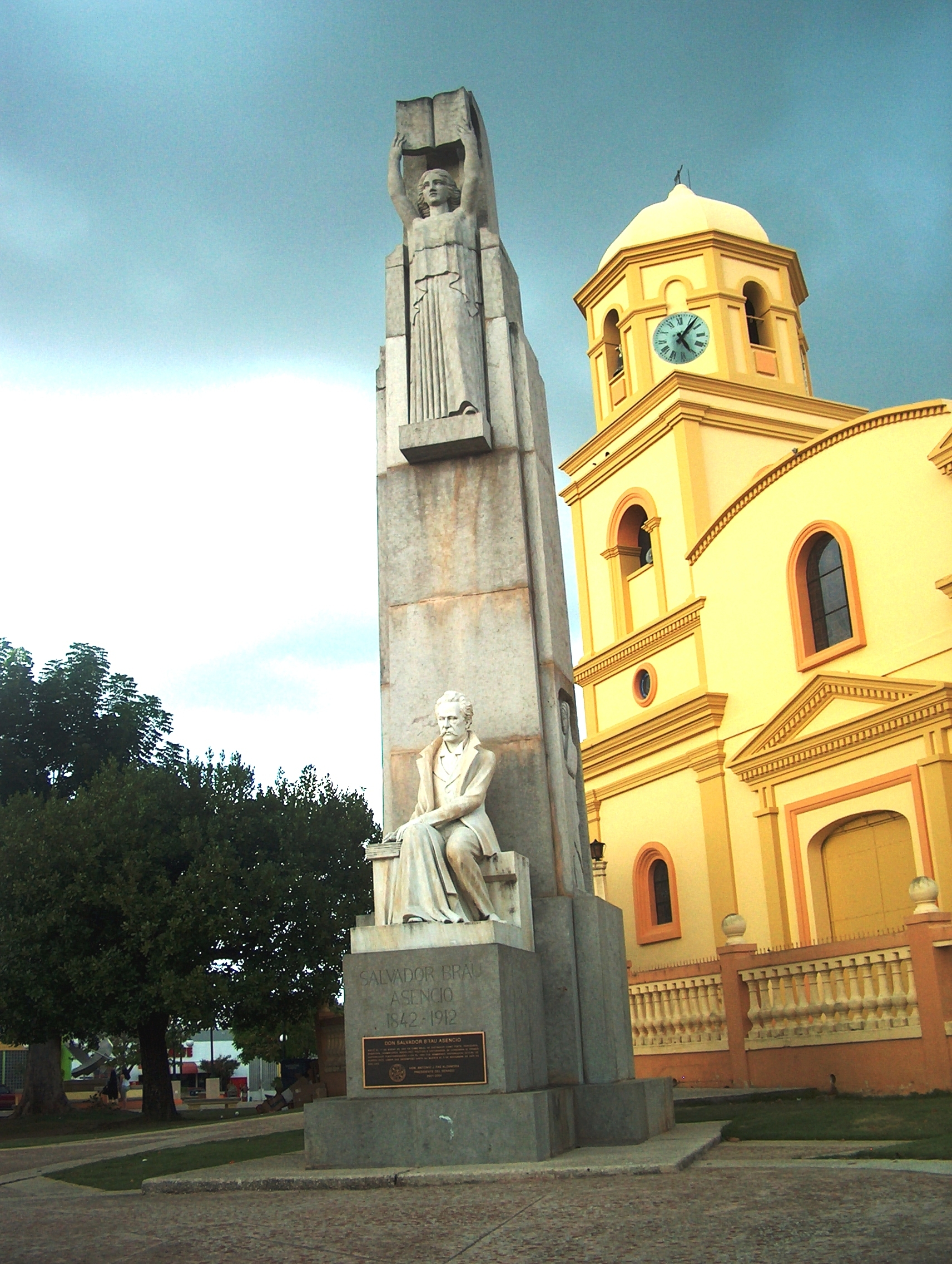
Monument to Salvador Brau in front of the San Miguel Arcángel Roman Catholic church (1783), Cabo Rojo

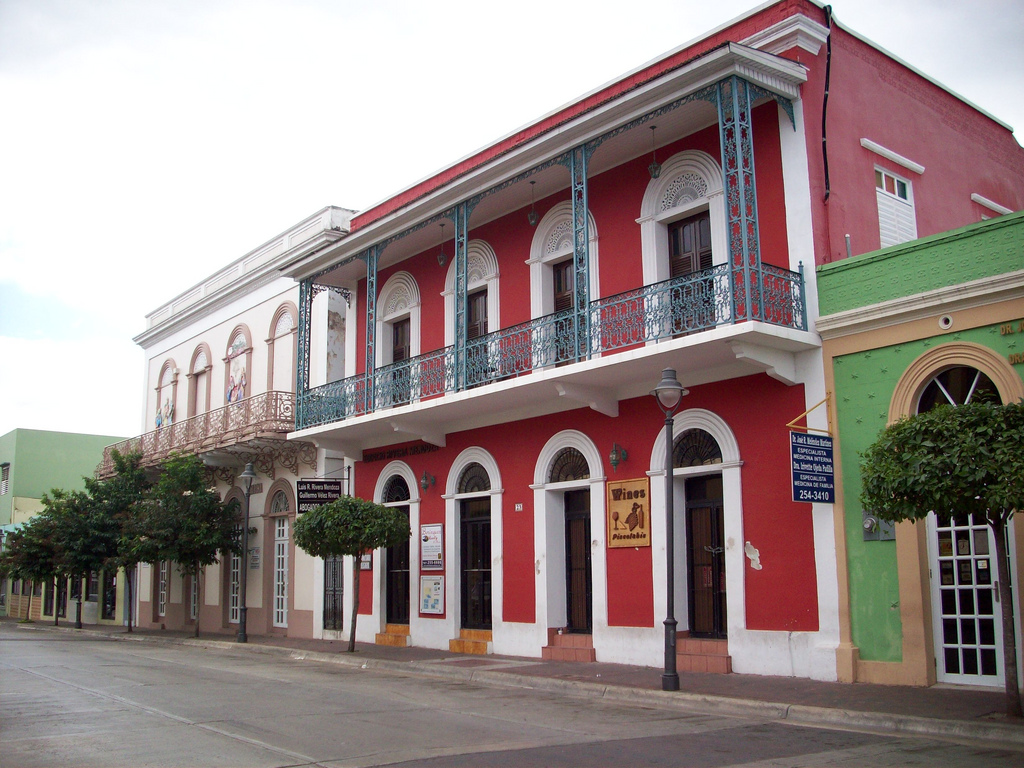
Historic buildings at Ruiz Belvis St.

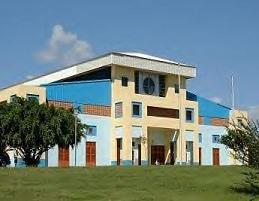
Coliseo Rebekah Colberg

== See also ==
- List of Puerto Ricans
- History of Puerto Rico
- National Register of Historic Places listings in Cabo Rojo, Puerto Rico
