= Folklore of Puerto Rico =

The folklore of Puerto Rico is distinctly syncretic, as it has been fed by the archipelago's constant influx of new social groups during thousands of years. It has been historically influenced by the groups that inhabited it during the Pre-Columbian era, the demographic and religious impact of the Spanish colonization of the Americas, the introduction of African slaves for the plantation economy, the daily life in a trade route including piracy or smugglers and, ultimately, the American influence that followed the Spanish-American War. In the last century, a multitude of homegrown aspects have begun differentiating local folklore further away from its historical influences, fueling a new subset of myths and legends that act as a defiance of its political reality and the reflection of modern concerns.

== History ==
=== Early cultural syncretism (1500-1599) ===
The European colonization began in full force after Juan Ponce de León arrived in 1508 and went into full effect when the native Taíno population rebelled against the foreign presence in the archipelago. Despite their relatively short interaction, the Taínos had a notable influence on Spanish culture, incorporating more words into the Castilian language than any other external influence. Daily customs were adopted by the colonizing settlers, including barbecue and the cultivation of corn and other New World plants. Despite the imposition of Catholicism being one of the European main goals, some of the Taíno religious beliefs also managed to become incorporated into the customs of the settlers.

The native beliefs included dour or spooky elements that were easy to adapt into this emerging folklore. For example, ghost stories were an important part of the Taíno ontological system and were most notably represented by the Hupia, guava-eating spirits that wandered the roads at night and were only differentiated from the living due to their lack of a bellybutton. This is said to have been a task to preserve the balance between the word of the dead and the living, while the fruit's name and its role in the story is a homage to Maquetaurie Guayaba, their bat-like god of the dead who ruled over the underworld realm known as Coaiba. The guava was also used to produce a black-colored pigment, associated with death. The Spanish co-opted this imagery for the legend of Los Ahorcados, the ghosts of hanged people that dangled from roadside trees late at night.

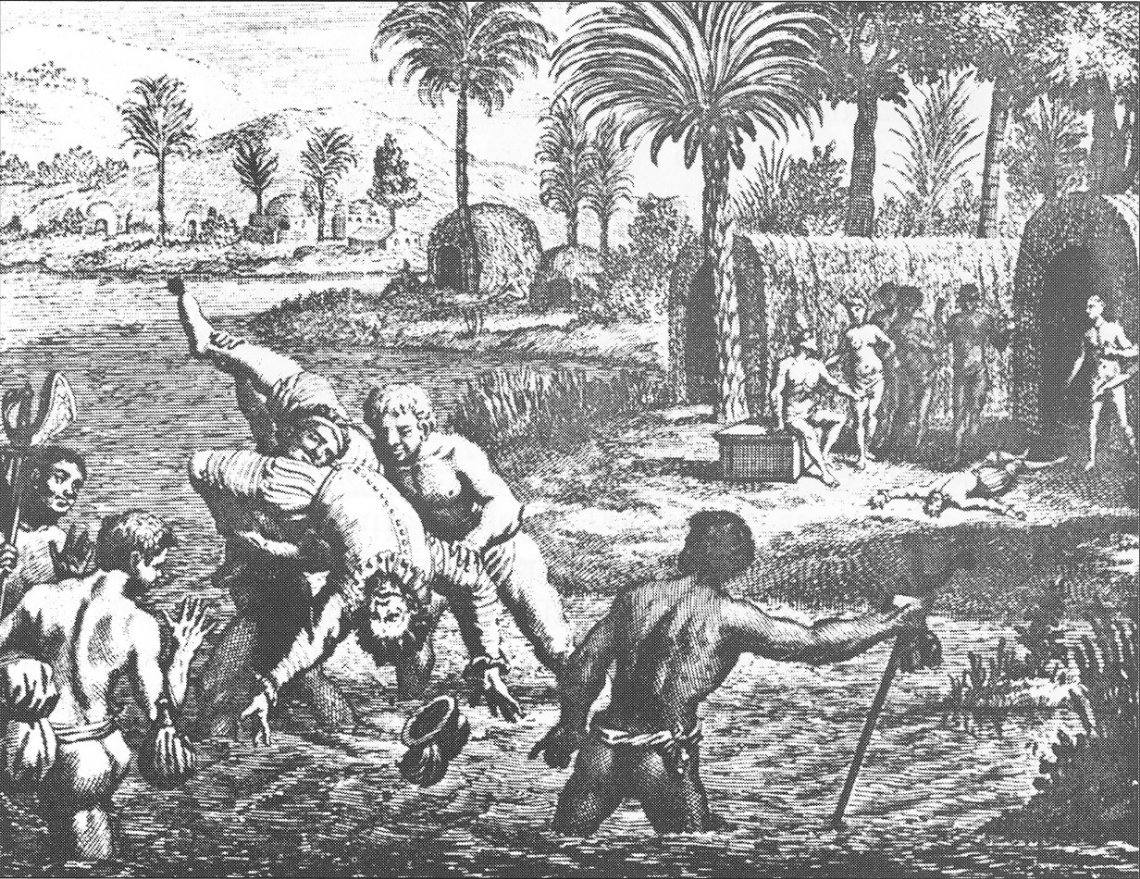
A depiction of the legend of Diego Salcedo's drowning at the hands of the Taíno.

Among the first adoptions that took place was that of the güiro and maracas, Taíno instruments used for religious rituals, by the European settlers who mixed them with Spanish instruments. In rural areas, the use of nasal signing originally used by the natives survived and was incorporated in the emerging genre of folk music. The Catholic Church provided the populace with instruments and formed musicians, which were used in service. The military organized the first bands. Several of the legends that trace back to this time, such as the tragic love tale of Guanina and the supposed drowning of a Spaniard named Diego Salcedo, concern the clash of both worlds and the effects that colonization had on the natives. Some of the characters in these tales are adaptations of actual historical figures, such as Cristóbal de Sotomayor. Others present more abstract concepts that intend to sell the moral of the story, such as the ideation that the rustling of the ceiba tree's leaves is the enduring whispers of those involved in forbidden relationships.

The import of African slaves once the native population began to decline brought with it religious beliefs and practices from numerous parts of the continent. Mostly localized near the coast, the settlements built by those that were freed contributed to the continuation of musical and dance traditions brought from their homelands. Their dancing, musical instruments and were, almost unchanged in their use at the plantations. However, the imposition of religion led to widespread religious syncretism. The slaves began associating certain aspects of their traditional gods with Catholic saints, covertly idolizing them in rituals that were purportedly Christian in nature.

As was the case with the Taino before them, the cultural clash between these slaves and the Europeans inspired legends. One such tale has its origins on the norther region of Arecibo and deals with the rebellion of a maroon named Carabalí. This former slave is said to have attacked the colonial settlement with a group of men, who operated from the jungle nearby, until they were eventually captured. Carabalí escaped jail on a foggy and rainy day and took refuge in Cueva de los Muertos, near the neighboring municipality of Utuado, while fleeing dogs set upon him by the Spanish authorities. The next morning, the dogs cornered him in the cave, where he tried defending himself with a machete before being downed. According to tradition, since then Cueva de los Muertos is said to be haunted by the spirits of the slaves, who emerge in an attempt to curse their former owners at night. The story also has a heavy Catholic element behind its superstition, since the reason that this happened is said to be that their souls cannot find peace is due dying in sin.

=== Buccaneers, corsairs, smugglers, saints and the Devil (1600-1800) ===
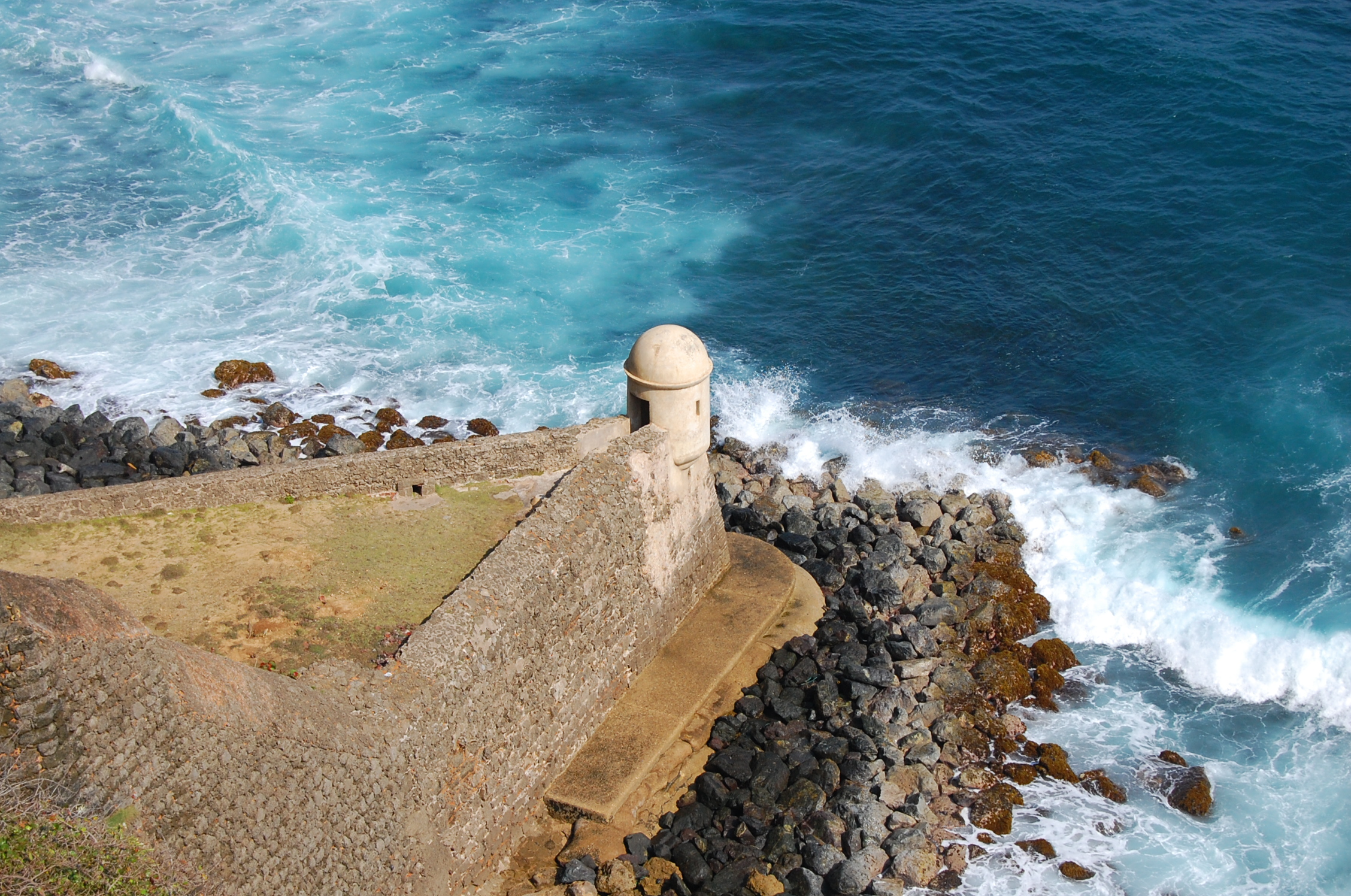
Sentry box that inspired the legend of the Garita del Diablo.

During this timeframe, legends were heavily influenced by Catholic beliefs. One of Puerto Rico's most famous legends, the Garita del Diablo (or “Devil’s sentry box”), dates back to the 17th century after the Fortín del Espigón was completed in 1634. According to another tradition, the first Marian apparition recorded in Puerto Rico was Our Lady of Hormigueros, who is claimed to have saved a man from a charging bull during the 17th century.

The constant attacks by pirates, buccaneers and privateers from rival nations fed a different type of folklore. Military victories over the likes of Francis Drake and Boudewijn Hendricksz, (known locally as El Drake and Balduino Enrico, respectively) were elevated, romanticized and passed on through the generation. The reputation of El Morro and other forts that littered the coasts of Old San Juan were greatly mythicized, both due their consecutive victories in naval engagements as their ability to endure an invasion led by George Clifford, who was able to temporarily seize the rest of the city. To this day, it is celebrated as the sole Spanish fort in the Caribbean that did not suffer a military loss and only falling into enemy hands once.

The legend of La Rogativa, based on a religious procession that took place during a blockade of San Juan Bay led by Ralph Abercrombie is also popular, as the British are depicted as mistaking the torches carried by those gathering for the arrival of reinforcements and fled. At a local level, figures such as Captain Antonio de los Reyes Correa in Arecibo and the whole populace of Cabo Rojo were incorporated into popular culture and celebrated by locals for successfully repelling foreign invaders. These tales were celebrated along the Catholic saints in town festivals.

Other stories involving pirates are not military in nature, most often dealing with purported buried treasures, such as a tale associating Portuguese corsair José Joaquim Almeida with the island of Caja de Muertos. In 1699, William Kidd stayed at Isla de Mona for ten days while the Quedagh Merchant was loaded with about 100,000 sterling pounds worth of cargo, gold and silver. Ever since, legends of his purported buried treasures on that island have been a cultural mainstay.

A legend surrounding the construction of the Capilla del Cristo goes back to a horse race that took place on Calle del Cristo in Old San Juan during the 18th century. A jockey, often referred as Baltazar Montañez, rode his horse over the edge at the end of the road. The chapel was built at the end of the street where the race took place. According to tradition, divine intervention saved the rider from dying along his horse. Festivities commemorating this event became a tradition among the Catholic populace of the walled city, who would gather around the chapel. Local folklore was not immune to influence from regional influence, with foreign legends such as elves that enjoyed treading the mane of horses during the night and La Llorona finding their way to Puerto Rico.

=== The 19th Century: The last pirate, uprisings and identity ===
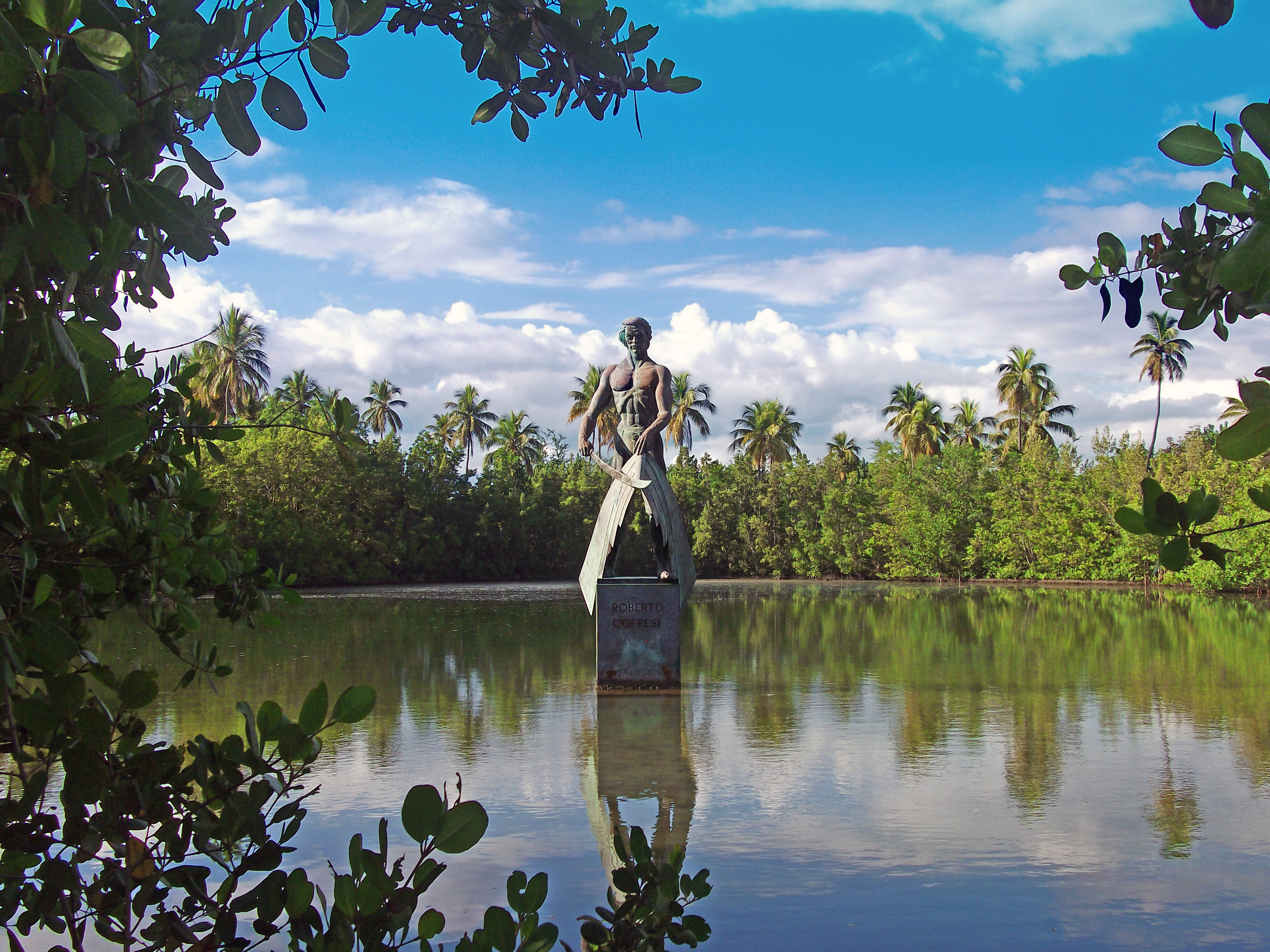
Statue of the pirate Roberto Cofresí.

Spiritist literature was covertly introduced to Puerto Rico during the 19th century, with the first spiritist centers appearing sometime during the 1870s or early in the following decade, with some sources placing Mayagüez's Centro Unión as having been founded in 1875 and being followed by Luz del Progreso soon afterwards. Mayagüez served as the epicenter of the movement in Puerto Rico. Soon, the prospect of introducing spiritist education at schools was supported by Iberian representative Manuel Corchado y Juarbe. After the Spanish-American War which stripped the Catholic Church of most of its administrative powers, spiritists expected growth.

The unexpected success that a young aristocrat from Cabo Rojo named Roberto Cofresí had as a plunderer a century after the end of the Golden Age of Piracy in the Caribbean catapulted him into legend. In life, he led an island-wide criminal enterprise and was said to share his loot with the populace as a way to keep the authorities at bay. By 1825, Cofresí was being hunted by several maritime powers including Spain, Gran Colombia, United States, Denmark, and the United Kingdom for the impact that his piracy was having on the regional trade routes. His disruption was sufficient to motive the creation of a rare alliance between the Spanish and Colombians, whose international relations had been strained since the start of the Spanish American wars of independence. Cofresí's luck eventually ran out and he was captured and publicly executed at Old San Juan.

Despite this, the romantic ideas about his figure that began appearing during his life took on a life of their own. The first legends about Cofresí painted him in good light, as a Robin Hood-type figure. Perhaps influenced in part by his own offer of 4,000 piece of eight to a prison guard shortly before his death, legends of a lost pirate treasure became widespread in places such as Cabo Rojo and Mona Island. However, not all legends surrounding Cofresí are positive, as another category deal with his supposed deal with the Devil, hauntings, ghost ship sightings and traps. As the Puerto Rican independence movement grew, tales of his supposed role as a privateer for Simon Bolívar became popular urban legends.

According to tradition, the Sana Muerto River acquired its name when a pallbearer slipped during a funeral procession that took place during the 1820s. It began at the rural Hato Yeguadilla and was supposed to end at the Ciales town church. The accident forced the casket's door and flipped the dead body into the water. Instead of being carried downstream, the deceased is said to have awoken and stood up, with those in the procession fleeing the scene leaving behind a very confused, but alive, peasant man. The curative powers attributed to the river by this tale became known widespread, still being sought after by those desperate enough to believe it.

=== Espiritismo, the ghosts of the walled city and beyond (1870-1898) ===
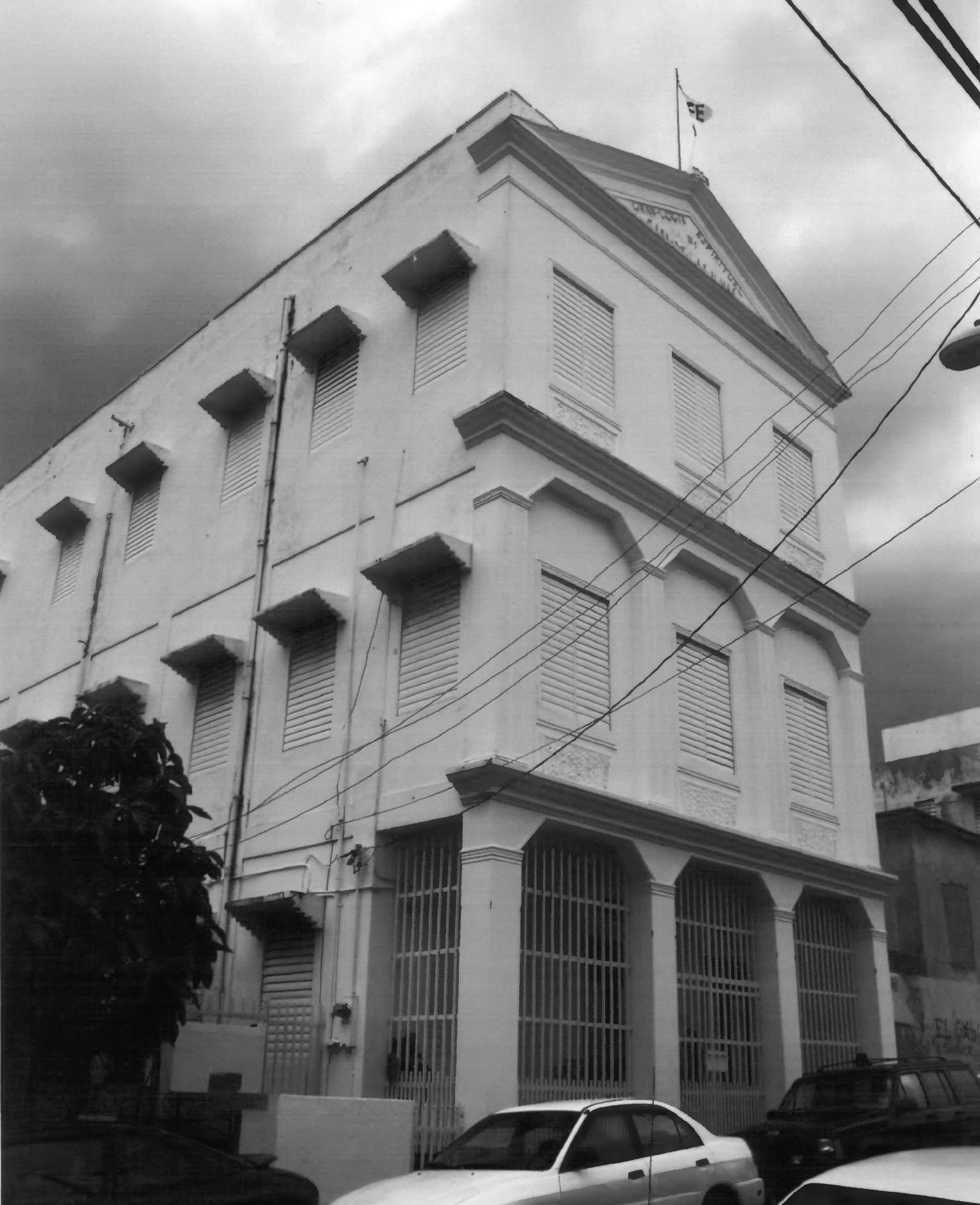
Gran Logia Espiritual Número 1

As the Catholic Church underwent a crisis during the end of the 19th century, a complimentary form of "popular Catholicism" emerged to live along it by filling the necessities left vacant by the institution. In Puerto Rico, spiritism was practiced by intellectuals that advocated in favor of abolition and scientific upbringing. The practitioners themselves were not organized homogeneously and on occasion, mediums with "patrons" were ostracized. Spanish authorities were suspicious of spiritist meetings and would post soldiers outside them. The Catholic Church would also monitor them, along freemasons and freethinkers. Puerto Rican Spiritists were often social Darwinists and extrapolated this philosophy into a spiritual plane, where each subsequent incarnation would mean advance towards "perfection". By 1878, Francisco del Valle Atiles became concerned that the popularity that spiritism was gaining within the poor was misrepresenting it in unscientific and irrational ways by charlatans. The elimination of superstition, in particular from the rural and poor, became a topic of public contention.

The local practice was distinctly distinct from its European sources, integrating the Taino and African elements that had permeated Puerto Rican culture for centuries. Espiritismo has been described as an “ethnocultural faith that maintains balance among four different cultures.” Among the populace, it was seen as both a spiritual tradition and a form of alternative medicine, in particular when dealing with mental health, becoming known as “psychiatry for the poor”. Puerto Rican folkloric espiritismo is also known as Mesa Blanca or “white table” and co-opts Catholic saints in the form of the wooden Santos de Palo, as well as other ritual elements such as prayers, holy water and incense. However, these co-exist along the Orishas from the Yoruba religion or their Christian counterparts, as used in former slave rituals, and the offering of rum to the spirits. From Taino memories come the rituals surrounding room cleansing and medium preparation, which mimic the preparation of the shaman or bohique, as well as a plight for the ancestors to intervene. Herbs used during the ceremony may come from native or African traditions, as both made wide use of them.

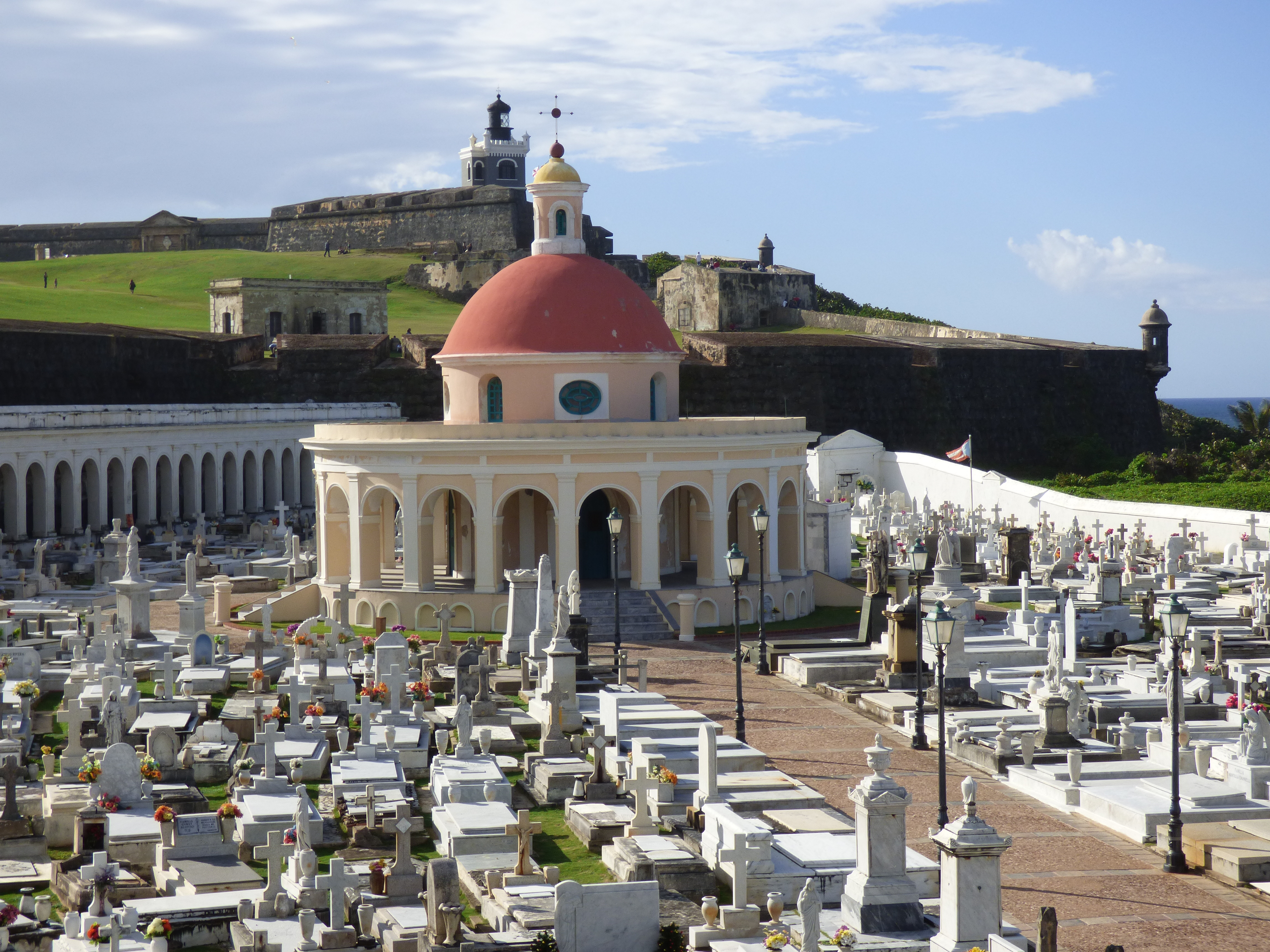
Santa María Magdalena de Pazzis Cemetery with Castillo San Felipe del Morro in the background.

Although mostly dualistic in its metaphysical approach, Puerto Rican espiritismo also incorporates a form of animism taken from the Taino, but replacing the zemi with the Santos the Palo. This openness to incorporate elements from all beliefs systems allowed it to not only circumvent being suppressed by the Catholic majority, but gain a large following among them and later, even Protestants incorporated these belief systems. The botica, a type of folk herb shop, became widespread in association with the practice, offering an example of cultural syncretism that included all three of its main cultural influences and even foreign elements as well.

On the other hand, ghost stories concerning Old San Juan and other, already ancient, Spanish settlements began to gain popularity. The military forts, especially Castillo San Felipe del Morro and Castillo San Cristóbal, have been a common setting for these tales. So is the historical Cementerio Santa María Magdalena de Pazzis, which houses a considerable amount of notables within its limits, as well as notorious criminals such as Cofresí in its outskirts. Other building associated with ghost stories at Old San Juan are Teatro Tapia and Hotel El Convento.

=== Music, dance and folk saints (1898-1950) ===
The Americanization project launched by the American colonial government not only intended to displace Spanish as the main language of Puerto Rico, but was also accompanied by an upheaval to the monolithic Catholic establishment that had prevailed for centuries. A new trend of Puerto Rican popular religion, considered by academic Quintero Rivera as “[a form of] marronage began expanding endemically in parallel.

In 1899, a woman known as Hermana Eudosia preached at Quebradillas following the devastating 1899 San Ciriaco hurricane, in the process influencing Eusebio Quiles, who would later play a part in other groups. That same year, Elenita de Jesús (a purported avatar of Mary and Our Lady of Mount Carmel in specific) gained prominence in San Lorenzo after settling at Montaña Santa and adopted the epithets De Jesús and Hermana, while followers began calling her Vuestra Madre. José De los Santos Morales, a self-proclaimed Hombre Dios, would claim prophetic visions of religious warfare against the invading Protestants and lead a movement that eventually settled into the creation of the pacific (but militant) Hermanos Cheo, who also claimed the occasional cure. Both of these groups were distinctly Catholic in origin and the latter would eventually find their way back into that structure after their preaching resulted in an influx of people back to the church. Both De Jesús and the Cheos saw the advances in technology as signs of the end of times, not by themselves but as parallels to social decay. However, they were a cause of concern for the canonical figures of Catholicism and attracted the intervention of bishop William A. Jones, among others. Despite also leading a Catholic revival, Elenita was suspected up to her 1909 death, as was her claim that a spring she left behind held miraculous properties. Among town priests, however, opinions of these "missionaries" were mixed and in some cases even benign. Priest Pedro Puras of San Lorenzo would be admonished for supporting a Cheo who was attacked in a freethinkers' newspaper. Spiritists believes that the actions of these inspirados played in favor of the Catholic Church, perhaps even covertly working for it. In turn, Elenita and the Cheos defended Catholic doctrine in an ongoing conflict against the spiritists and masons, resulting in a number of public clashes. This was despite being suspected of having spiritist vestiges themselves by the church, which made an effort to discredit them publicly. The government, however, was mostly indifferent of them, only intervening on a few instances. The Union Party benefitted from the Cheos, with José de los Santos Morales running under it. Carlos Torres, who would gain prominence within the Cheos, was allowed in after completing a nine-year pilgrimage that began in 1921.

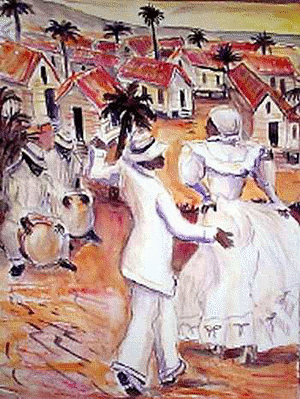
Bomba is a popular dance that can trace its roots all the way back to free black slaves.

During the early 20th century, Spiritists, Catholics and Protestants engaged in an attempt to attract women and rejuvenate the religious escape of Puerto Rico. The Puerto Rican spiritist press developed an internationalist approach, covering international research, development and foreign individuals such as Juan Manso. In 1903, the Puerto Rican spiritist federation was created. The local community also published El Iris de Paz, through which the antics and popularity of Manso were seen as a way to advance the "cause" in both Antilles. The Committee for Spiritist Defense and Propaganda ultimately choose a group of common individuals over politician Rosendo Matienzo Cintrón for a meeting with Manso. In 1922, a woman known as La Samaritana who professed the power to cure was accepted by spiritists.

By the 1920s, there were 150 spiritist organizations in Puerto Rico, but they were immersed in efforts to regain strength after Matienzo had died and the movement had lost both of its main papers. Francisco Ponte Jiménez tried to write favorably about it in El Libro de Puerto Rico while new papers were founded. Near the turn of the century, a legend about the ghosts of an accident haunting the Guajataca Tunnel, which then hosted a railroad segment, after a mass accident in 1921 gained popularity.

Purported healer (using "magnetized" water) Julia Vázquez of San Lorenzo, popularly known as La Samaritana, was adopted as the central figure of a propaganda campaign led by former federation president Juan Jiménez García in an attempt to revive popularity, but also created an internal rift among those that considered her a propagator of superstition. Despite this, the public's enthusiasm with her led (which among other things spawned a contemporary film) to the belief that she could bolster spiritism over other religions in the eastern zone. Catholics soon learned of this and launched counter-campaigns of their own. While initially popular among her fellow peasants, Vázquez soon gained a following that included professionals and politicians, among others, who would visit her at barrio Hato.

By 1908, the federation treated race in the same manner as Kardec, being something trivial to the nature of the spirit. Other fringe topics attached themselves to the spiritist. In 1914, "magnetic surgery" was claimed by a woman known as Médica de Puerta de Tierra.

A group of spiritists concerned with La Samaritana was part of the Club de Estudios Psicológicos Ramón Emeterio Betances, who believed that she may have been influenced and that the water she prescribed had properties of unknown consequence. They were also skeptical that she was actually mediating with the disembodied spirit of priest Joaquín Saras, as the behavior was more consistent with a lowly spirit (per Kardec's classification). The ensuing debate grew to include former federation president Ramón Negrón Flores, who was critical of the group's report. A medium was brought in by Ponte Jiménez, endorsing La Samaritana as legitimate during a seance. She would eventually retire and get married, but her name would be used in campaigns against superstition for years to come. In 1934, reformist demanded changes that moved away from African customs, displacing the federation's board.

Many legends were cautionary tales, such as the legend of El Jacho, the ghost of a man named Centeno who had been cursed to wander the country side at night looking for the ashes of a cross that he had lit on fire to find his way in the dark before dying. Los Desmembrados, a group of ghostly legs or otherwise incomplete specters supposedly spotted walking roadside at Lajas, were tied to the increase in fatal accidents that accompanied the popularization of cars and their irresponsible use.

=== Manipulation of folklore as a sociopolitical tool (1950-1970) ===
As Luis Muñoz Marín rose in sociopolitical influence, religious elements that had been persecuted in the past became part of the emerging folklore. The government actually facilitated some practices, such as when it helped mediate traffic to the municipality of Sabana Grande following reports of Marian apparitions. Media outlets such as El Mundo, El Imparcial and WKAQ publicized the Marian apparitions being reported in 1953, publishing both critical and sympathetic pieces. The epicenter of these was barrio Rincón of Sabana Grande, where a group of children claimed to have seen Mary. Tens of thousands traveled across the island to visit the location. The cultural impact was such that the name Milagros ("miracles" in Spanish) experienced an upsurge and movies about Marian apparitions encountered newfound popularity. The coverage of Marian apparitions by El Imparcial and other newspapers grew critics from various sectors. Likewise, reports of UFOs and other religious claims were considered to be counterproductive to the government's DIVEDCO initiative.

Institutionally, the Catholic church was skeptical of the apparitions, as conflicting reports found their way to the media and the children disagreed, even arguing that perhaps they had seen something else (such as a ghost). A consensus ultimately linked the Virgen del Pozo with the Lady of Fatima (which the local furor surpassed in attendance, reaching up to 150,000 followers) while Santía Martínez Lugo was expelled for claiming that it was La Milagrosa. The apparition, which was described as possessing a complexion not unlike the local population, was identified with various devotional titles of Mary, eventually becoming known as La Virgen del Rosario. Other celestial phenomena were reported throughout Puerto Rico, these involving odd behavior and/or characteristic in the sun or colored rain. Scientist Facundo Bueso of the University of Puerto Rico hypothesized that this was due to atmospheric conditions. Other professionals held positions that ranged from dismissal to open-mindedness. The spring was remodeled to resembled that of Our Lady of Lourdes.

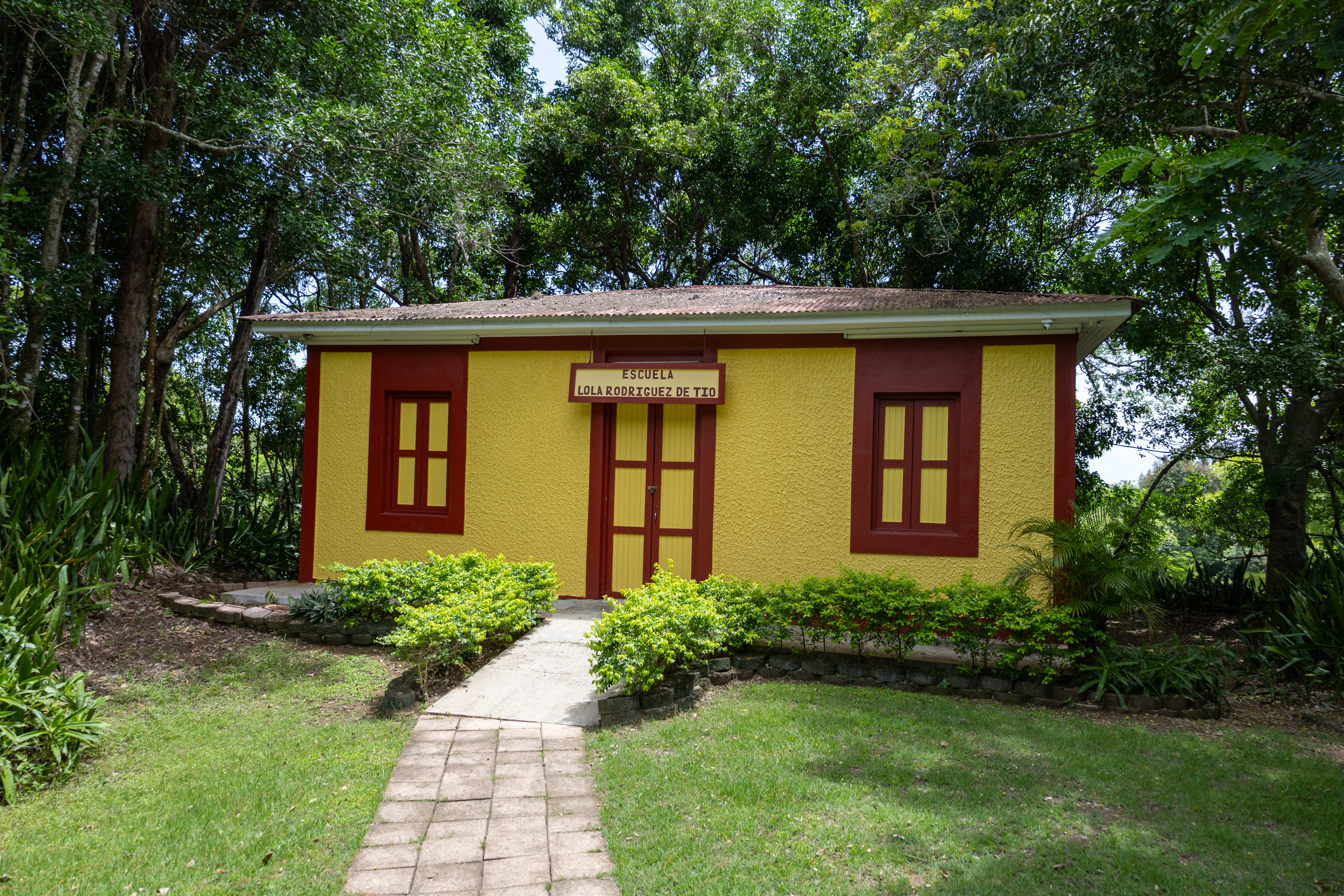
School associated with the Virgen del Pozo apparitions (2025)

The Church attempted to counteract the furor by emphasizing other Marian traditions, such as Fatima. The Virgin of Providence was also named patroness of Puerto Rico despite having a diminished following. However, apparitions were reported elsewhere (this time in Santurce) and the grief surrounding the ongoing Korean War fueled the following's piousness. The local Church dioceses refused to report the purported miracles, noting the absence of meaningful messages and odd pattern of daily apparitions. One of the children, Juan Ángel, was later reported to have received a number of messages, which had been first given (and retracted) written in parchment. Despite actively involved in a campaign against practices that it considered superstitious, the central government choose to only serve as a mediator, moderating the crowds successfully, achieving a level of order that resulted in no arrests among the devotees. On the other hand, Manuel García, the mayor of Sabana Grande took measures to rid the town of "undesirables" that had arrived after the reports. The effect that the events had for the region, a notable reduction of "impious" activities as well as the economic impact of such a large mass, made mayors and politicians "defenders" of their authenticity. The date for a "day of miracles" was announced, May 25, among which would be an earthquake that only Protestants would feel was announced by one of the seers. Despite this, the events attracted a small quantity of both Protestants and Spiritists. In the weeks leading up to the date, another apparition was reported in the school attended by the children. The coverage reached the international level, with foreigners arriving from abroad. The announced day saw some reports of cures, but also left dissatisfaction among those that expected to receive a "miracle" (notably an end-of-times event) and did not. The day afterwards, another apparition was reported at Toa Alta. Followers were later formally organized in a group led by Juan Ángel Collado.

=== The popular culture surge (1971-1989) ===
Foreign superstition found its way to Puerto Rico as media became more international in its scope with the popularization of cable television. The pervasive North American legend of Bigfoot was adapted to a local public, with reported sightings of a pigmy vegetarian hominid that ate plantain buds taking place in, giving rise to a short lived trend of newspaper articles speculating about the existence of this creature, which became popularly known as Comecogollo. In another instance, charlatans at Fajardo cut a ray to create a Jenny Haniver, which received media attention in 1974 as it was dubbed with the name of Garadiabolo (Garamendi's Devil) and given a purported backstory of its appearance at Laguna Aguas Prietas in Fajardo.

The killing of livestock by unidentified means have fueled urban legends for decades in Puerto Rico. A 19th century piece where Luis Díaz Soler reported on large vampire bats has been cited as the origin of this trend in Puerto Rico. The first modern instances of these were reported in the western municipality of Moca in 1975 and were widely attributed to several red herrings, including satanic cults and a stereotypical vampire that became known as El Vampiro de Moca. Sensationalist pieces from El Vocero were mainly responsible for giving coverage to the purported creature, for which reporter Augusto Vale Salinas was reprimanded by the president of the Asociación de Periodistas, Tomás Stella, who considered that it promoted obscurantism. Among other questionable tactics employed was reporting that anomalous radiation levels had been detected in Héctor Vega's property (the property first associated with the attacks), despite other sources discrediting these claims. Likewise, historian Fernando Picó criticized what he perceived as a representation of "subversive" elements used in sensationalist fashion for political purpose. El Vocero, which was amidst a surge in distribution that took it to 90,000 copies per day product of the reports, rebuffed the accusations.

Folk saints did not disappear completely. The legacy of Elenita continued creating controversy, even leading to a bishop speculating whether her experiences would one day be recognized as a legitimate apparition, despite clear institutional opposition to such notions. A shrine for her was built at Montaña Santa where the spring is located, experiencing a resurgence during the 1980s. On occasion, visions of her are reported. Hispanic Caribbean witchcraft, or brujería, and other previously maligned practices such as those with cult-like elements had crept under the "haven" of public acceptance as well. Once the livestock slayings ceased after six months, so too did the sighting reports associated with it.

=== The monsters of the post-Cold War anxieties (1990-present) ===
The original depiction of the Chupacabras as a monster has been studied, with reports arguing a strong influence by contemporary horror-science fiction movie Species on its design.

A new wave of livestock attacks in 1995 that began in Canóvanas peaked the media interest and led to a new urban legend, which received the tongue in cheek name of Chupacabras (anglicized as Chupacabra) or goat sucker, with purported sightings being reported throughout the archipelago. Of the Puerto Rican myths and legends, the Chupacabras has by far gained the most prominence internationally, though it has often been erroneously associated with Mexico, where the name was culturally co-opted afterwards.

The name, which is inherently satirical in nature, shifted the perception of the attacks from concern to comedy. The name was considered unfortunate both locally and by foreign media, such as Ocurrió Así, where it was argued that it served to repel the intervention of the authorities. Knowing this well, journalist Jorge Martín tried to counteract this popularity and change it to "EBAs". He was responsible for drawing the first sketch of the purported creature, as described by Canóvanas resident Madeline Tolentino, popularizing the image of an otherworldly predator in the general populace. Politicians that tried to push the matter in the HOR opted to avoid using the name directly. Once again, El Vocero would be responsible for promoting a sensationalist series on the Chupacabras, this one focusing on the antics of Canóvanas mayor José Soto and his “Chemo Jones” adventurer alter ego. This persona was born when he embraced mocking comparisons to Indiana Jones and John Rambo that were lobbied at him following eccentric claims that the creature had to be hunted down before attacking humans.

Despite reporting having a tongue-in-cheek approach, this was not enough to prevent the critics of The Washington Post. When a road of El Yunque was closed following Hurricane Hortense and a group of enthusiasts was turned back, satirical depictions of it as an "endangered species" mocked the government . For the most part, the general populace joined the fray out of amusement rather than superstition, acting accordingly in the media and constantly making the government look bad. Frustrated with a flood of contradictions, officials stopped collecting samples provided by the citizenship, opening the door to even more conspiracy theories.

It has been posited that these reports are a mental representation of local concerns dealing with American interventionism, displacement and a perceived appropriation of ownership and power. On the outskirts of the Cold War, several socioeconomic issues gained even more prominence in the public consciousness, chief of which were the enduring issue of the political status of Puerto Rico and a campaign of protests against the presence of the United States Navy in the island municipality of Vieques. Longstanding political analysts Juan Manuel García Passalacqua and Farhan Haq linked the Chupacabra to the status issue. Due to the fact that several of these concerns are shared by Latin American countries due to United States foreign policy such as Operation Condor, so too did the legend of the Chupacabras spread well beyond Puerto Rico and became a global phenomenon, especially among Spanish-speaking communities. The first depictions of the Chupacabras as a spiked reptilian chimera correlated with 1990s popular culture and a correlation with movie aliens and UFO culture have been established. Ultimately, these satirical depictions broke with the preset norms and acted as both "representation of troubled relationships" and a way of "solving the problem they represent" in a wanga-like fashion.

Anthropologist Ricardo Alegría argued that the sightings responded to a mythological background that fueled Puerto Rican culture well before the first reports of the Chupacabra. The antics of Soto attracted even the reluctant The San Juan Star. While noting the generation of "monster-money" from the sale of merchandise, Reinaldo L. Román argued a sociopolitical influence behind its origin and that its narratives serve as a reflection of local excesses by the United States government.

Stories dealing with the Chupacabras have never faded from Puerto Rican media, surging in popularity every few years. However, a host of new modern myths involving winged creatures that look like gargoyles and smell of sulfur has emerged during the early 21st century in parallel to the Chupacabras, joining its predecessors in the fringes of society and finding a place to flourish in rural areas where belief in folkloric magic is still prevalent.

== Cultural icons ==
=== Athlete folk saints ===
In life, Roberto Clemente was considered baseball’s first Latin American superstar, he was an five-tool player that gathered numerous awards in both offensive and defensive categories, including Major League Baseball’s (MLB) 1966 National League Most Valuable Player inspiring foreign athletes such as Michael Jordan for his performance. However, his penchant for charity outside the field as well as the circumstances of his death, have impacted his legacy more than his stellar performances. Clemente died in a plane crash off the coast of the Luis Muñoz Marín Airport of the New Year’s Eve while flying relief aid to the victims of the 1972 Nicaragua earthquake. MLB waived the waiting period for induction into the Hall of Fame and named its accolade for humanitarian involvement the Roberto Clemente Award. From that moment on, Clemente would become the athlete with most statues and monuments commemorating his memory in the world.

In Puerto Rico, his figure became venerated to the point of reaching the status of folk saint and folk hero, being widely regarded as an example of righteousness generations after his dead. This perception has been formalized into a campaign to have Clemente canonized by the Catholic Church, which gathered headlines during the 2010s. At the moment, the Vatican only noted that reports of the process having begun under Pope Francis were false. However, the attention gathered a renewed effort to emphasize the humanitarian side of Clemente, as well as his unofficial status as a patron saint in Puerto Rico and elsewhere.

== Characteristics ==
=== Recurring themes ===
Religion is by far the most recurring theme in Puerto Rican folklore. However, despite centuries of state-sponsored Catholicism, many symbols and customs from Taíno and African culture also form part of the folkloric traditions.

=== Common practices and customs ===
Like other areas of culture, early folkloric dance responded to the Spanish caste system. White criollos, or those with social status, adopted ballroom dances and other forms usually reserved for the privileged. In time, these revolves to become a genre all of its own, known as danza puertorriqueña, which gathered celebrity during the 19th century. Among those less privileged, as well as freed slaves and some immigrants, less formal music and dancing styles were popular. In mountainous regions, jíbaros created an eponymous genre that incorporated maracas and Spanish instruments, along endemic creations such as the Puerto Rican cuatro and triple. In coastal settlements, such as San Mateo de Cangrejeros and Loíza, African influence remained prevalent, which were eventually adapted into the modern version of bomba.

People in rural areas usually did not have access to high end models or statuettes of the Catholic saints used in their religious rituals. This led to a long-established practice of carving these figures by hand. With time, this evolved into a distinct art form, with characteristics uniquely displayed by Puerto Rican wood carvers. By the 20th century, the tradition became known as talla de Santos and became fashionable to collect these totems, even among the higher classes and the academic canon. However, Ricardo Alegría's interest in the exhibition of the Talla de Santos stattuettes was criticized from within the Catholic Church, such as was the case of priest Marcolino Mass who argued that it was a "folkloric thing" but not art.

=== Art and motifs ===
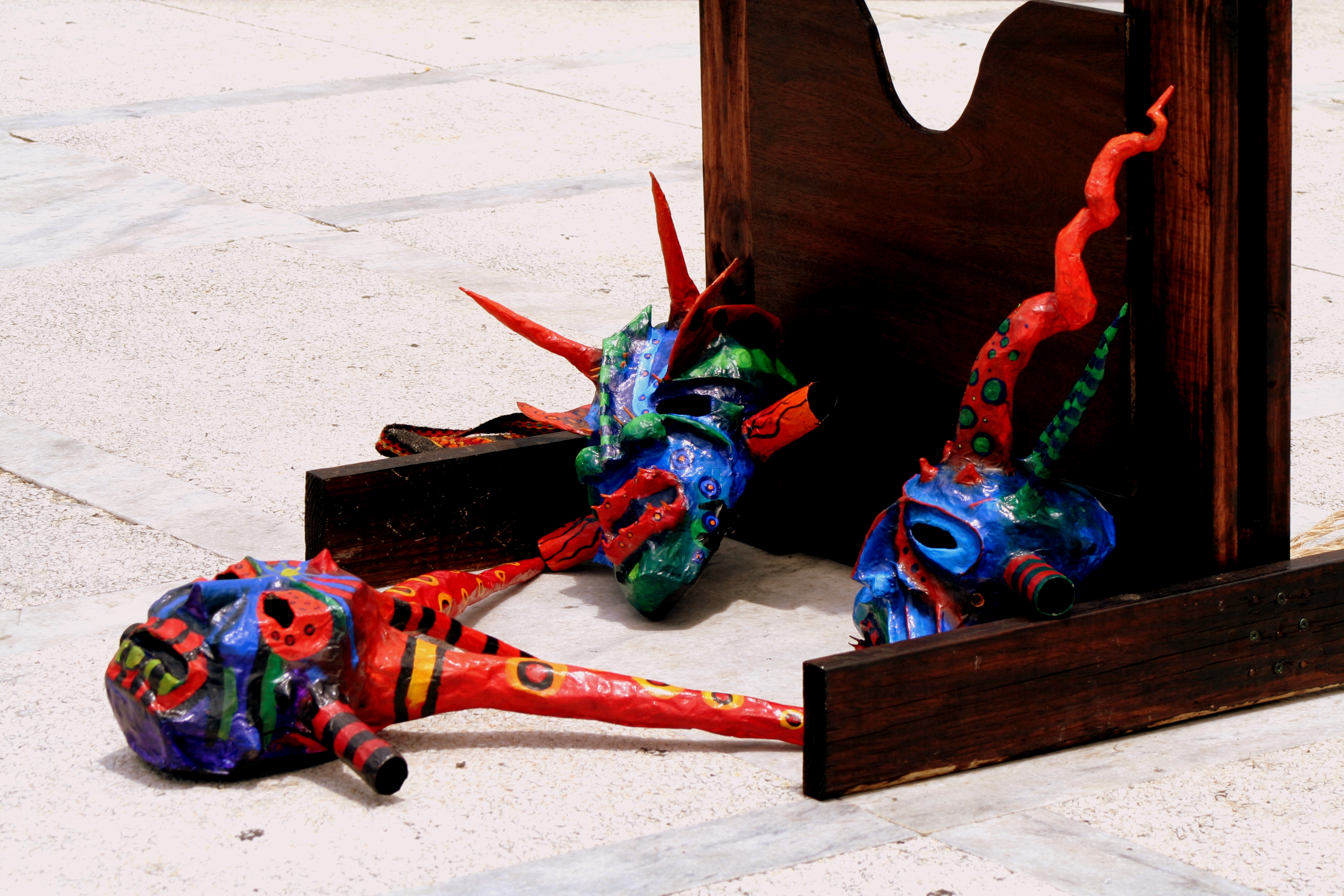
Vejigante masks.

The vejigante comes in two variations, those of Loíza are depicted as colorful horned monsters with crooked teeth and they represent a demonization of the Moors by the ancestors of the people involved in the Reconquista as part of the traditional Santiago Feast. The other variant, whose masks depict more reptilian-looking albeit equally colorful monsters with forked tongues, are a personification of mischief and their role is to play pranks on the populace during the Ponce Festival. Both variants wear festive costumes that resemble wings.

=== Literature ===
For centuries, folklore was passed down through the generations by a longstanding oral tradition, which still persists to this day. Compilation of these tales, legends and beliefs began when the liberal beliefs of a highly educated cadre of 19th century Puerto Rican intellectuals, began researching the past and compiled work dealing with areas of study that had been ignored by the colonial establishment up to that point.

== Puerto Rican folklore abroad ==
=== Academic study ===
Aspects of local folklore have been adapted into the curriculum of some colleges, such as Hunter College. In his capstone thesis for Texas A&M University, author Charis R. Adkins concluded that the "Puerto Rican fairy tale collection highlighted the latter’s incorporation of local customs and dialects", a trait absent in Cuban folklore.
