= Gran Logia Espiritual Número 1 =

- U.S. National Register of Historic Places
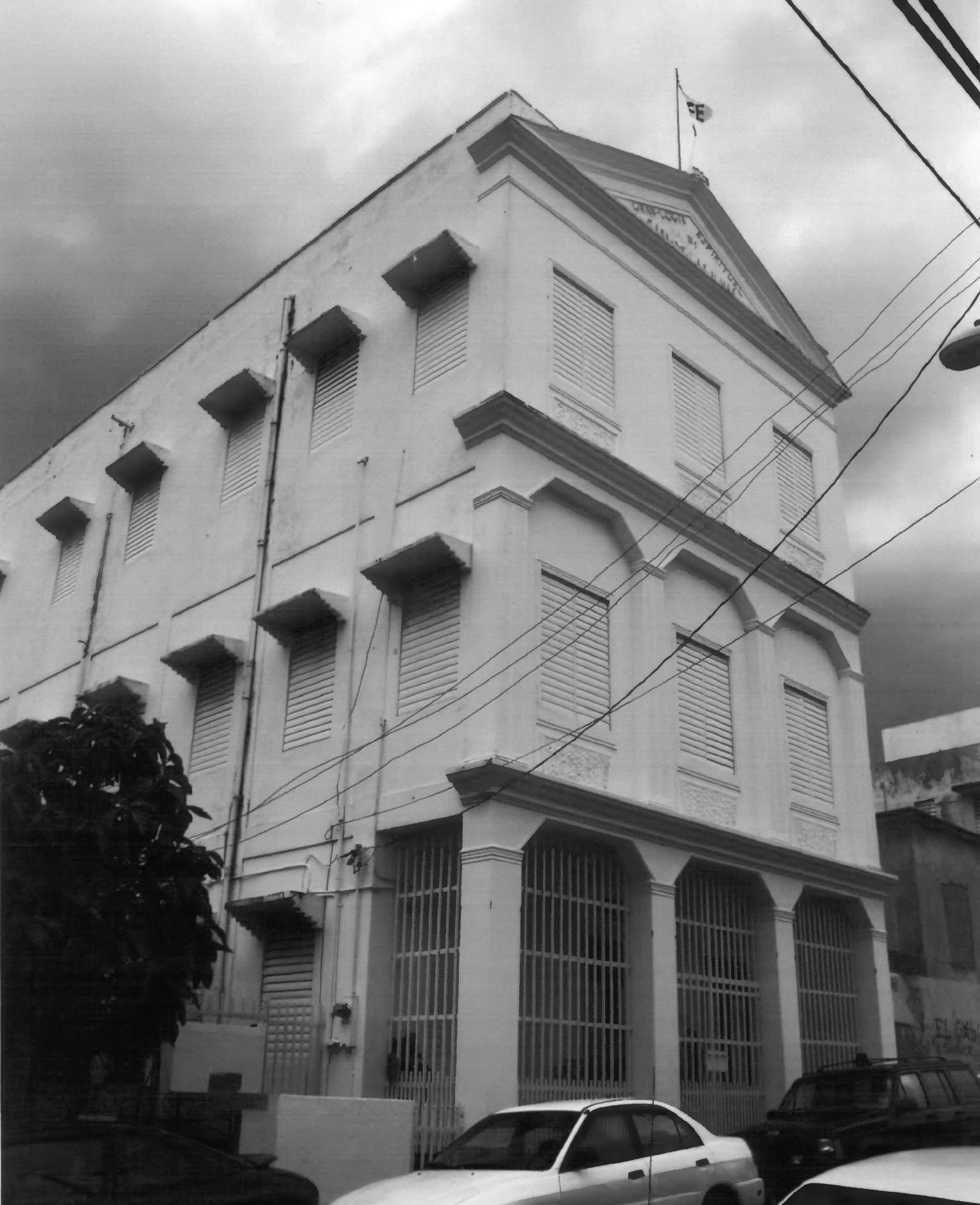
- Casa de Almas in 2006.

- Location within Puerto Rico
- Location: 1612 Antonsanti Street San Juan, Puerto Rico
- Coordinates: 18°26′46″N 66°03′52″W
- Built: 1928
- Architect: Luis F. Delgado and Juan Rivera Paris
- Architectural style: Classical Revival
- NRHP reference No.: 06000507
- Added to NRHP: June 8, 2008

Grand Spiritual Lodge No. 1 (Spanish: Gran Logia Espiritual Número 1), also known as Casa de las Almas ('house of the souls'), is a historic building and Spiritualist meeting hall located in Santurce in the city of San Juan, Puerto Rico. It was designed by Luis F. Delgado and Juan Rivera Paris using a simple but elegant Neoclassical style. The structure was built by members of the lodge in 1928 with the intended purpose of serving as a Spiritualist meeting hall for a local Spiritualist lodge (centro espiritista) founded in 1910. It was added to the National Register of Historic Places in 2008 for its historic and architectural significance.

Casa de las Almas was the main Spiritualist center in Puerto Rico that belonged to the philosophical and spiritual doctrine founded by Allan Kardec. Previous Spiritualist centers existed in the island since the 1870s, such as in the western city of Mayagüez. These centers would usually be closed down by the deeply-Catholic Spanish colonial government. The political changes that were brought by the United States and the separation between state and church in the aftermath of the Spanish-American War allowed for many of these previously outlawed movements to freely flourish beginning in 1903. By 1920 there were at least 150 Spiritualist centers in the island, and it was under this environment that the community of Casa de las Almas was established by Balbino Vázquez and his wife María Cruz Carpintero. This center mostly attracted members of the working-class community and women who were previously unable to have an active participation in the Catholic church or in the traditional social and spiritual organizations of the time. Some notable individuals who were members of this community included Rosendo Matienzo Cintrón, Vicente Geigel Polanco and Roberto H. Todd. The institution was later incorporated as a non-profit organization in 1930, and today it is possibly the largest and most renown organization of its type in Puerto Rico.

== See also ==
- Religion in Puerto Rico
- Spiritist centre
