= Cabo Rojo National Wildlife Refuge =

National wildlife refuge in the Puerto Rico archipelago

- IUCN category Ia (strict nature reserve)
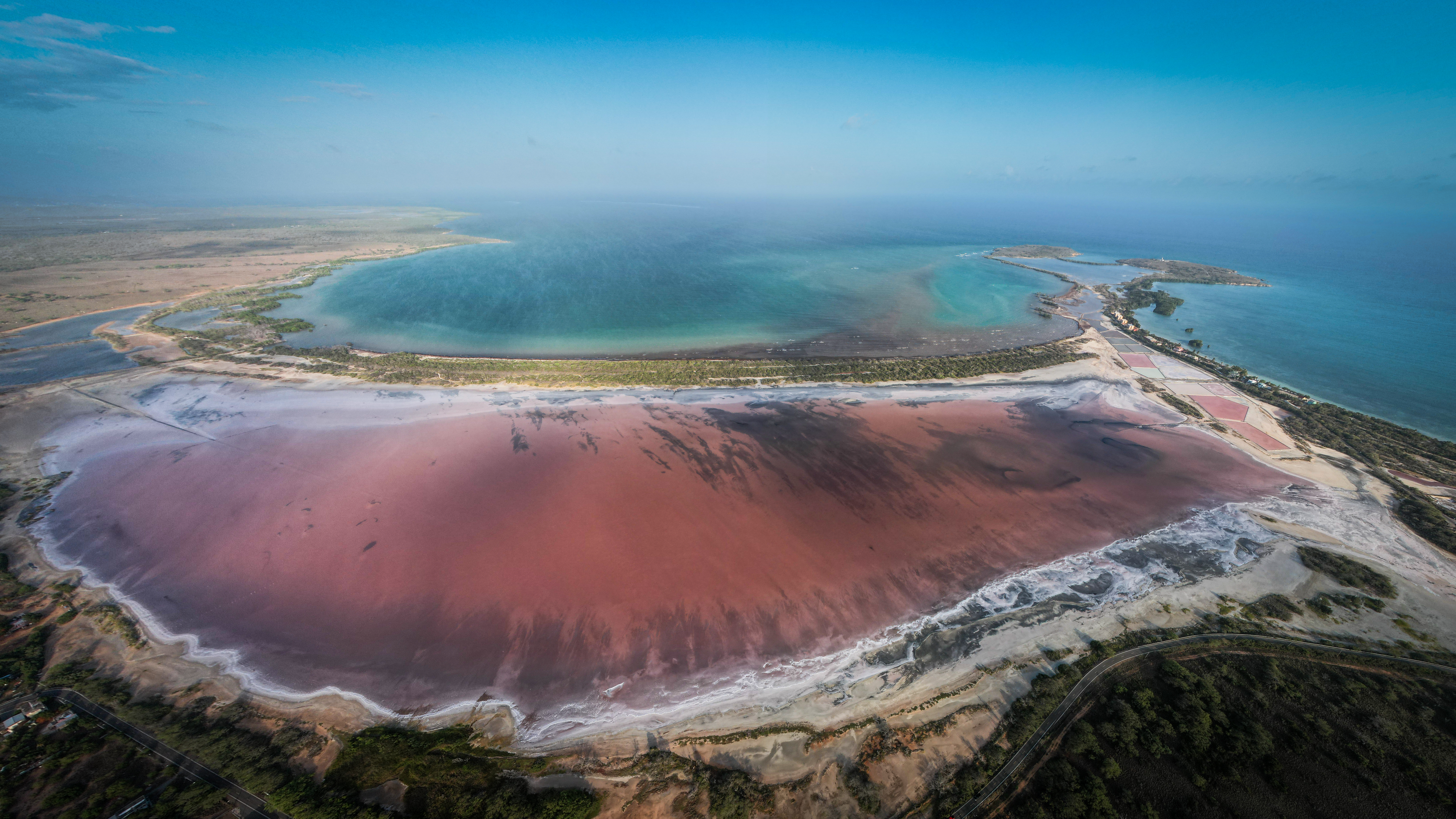
- Aerial view of Laguna Fraternidad, the largest hypersaline lagoon in the refuge.

- Location within Puerto Rico
- Location: Cabo Rojo, Puerto Rico
- Nearest city: El Combate, Cabo Rojo, Puerto Rico
- Coordinates: 17°58′45″N 67°10′06″W
- Area: 1,836 acres (7.43 km^{2})
- Established: 1974
- Governing body: U.S. Fish and Wildlife Service
- Website: www.fws.gov/refuge/Cabo_Rojo

Cabo Rojo National Wildlife Refuge (Spanish: Refugio Nacional de Vida Silvestre de Cabo Rojo) is an 1,836-acre National Wildlife Refuge located in southwestern coast of the main island of Puerto Rico, in the municipality of Cabo Rojo. The wildlife refuge is centered around two large hypersaline lagoons: Fraternidad and Candelaria, located along the flanks of the southwestern tip of the island: Los Morrillos de los Cabos Rojos, itself managed by the commonwealth of Puerto Rico as part of the Boquerón State Forest.

The refuge is a habitat for number of native and endemic bird species including the endangered yellow-shouldered blackbird, locally known as mariquita de Puerto Rico or capitán. Due to its geographic location, many birds find their way to the refuge while migrating between North and South America, and more than 180 bird species have been recorded in the area.

In addition to its ecological value, the refuge is home to the historic Cabo Rojo Salt Flats, one of the oldest salt mining sites in the Americas.

== Management ==
The Cabo Rojo National Wildlife Refuge is administered as part of the Caribbean Islands National Wildlife complex.

=== Special designations ===
The refuge has been designated a Critical Habitat for the yellow-shouldered blackbird (Agelaius xanthomus), and the Cabo Rojo Salt Flats are recognized as an Important Critical Wildlife site within the refuge. The refuge has also been declared a BirdLife International Important Bird Area (under the name Suroeste de Puerto Rico) and was the first Caribbean site to be added to the Western Hemisphere Shorebird Reserve Network (WHSRN).

== History ==
The refuge was established in 1974, when 587 acres of land were obtained by the U.S. Fish and Wildlife Service (FWS) from the Central Intelligence Agency which had operated the Caribbean Bureau of the Foreign Broadcast Information Service (FBIS) there for a number of years. Onsite administration of the refuge was not established until 1978.

=== Cabo Rojo Salt Flats ===
In 1999, the FWS purchased and added to the refuge the Cabo Rojo Salt Flats, a historic salt mining site located near the Los Morrillos Lighthouse. Salt extraction activity here dates to as early as 700 C.E., and is considered one of the oldest industries in the Americas. Salt extraction in the area further developed under the Spanish Crown, which authorized the industrial-scale extraction of salt for the purpose of food preservation across the region. At the time, this was one of the most important industries for the local economy. While the salt harvesting is still operated by a private corporation, the water levels of the salt flats are monitored and controlled for the benefit of both resident and migrating waterbirds.

Caborrojeños Pro Salud y Ambiente, a local civic group, runs a visitor center in the salt flats area.

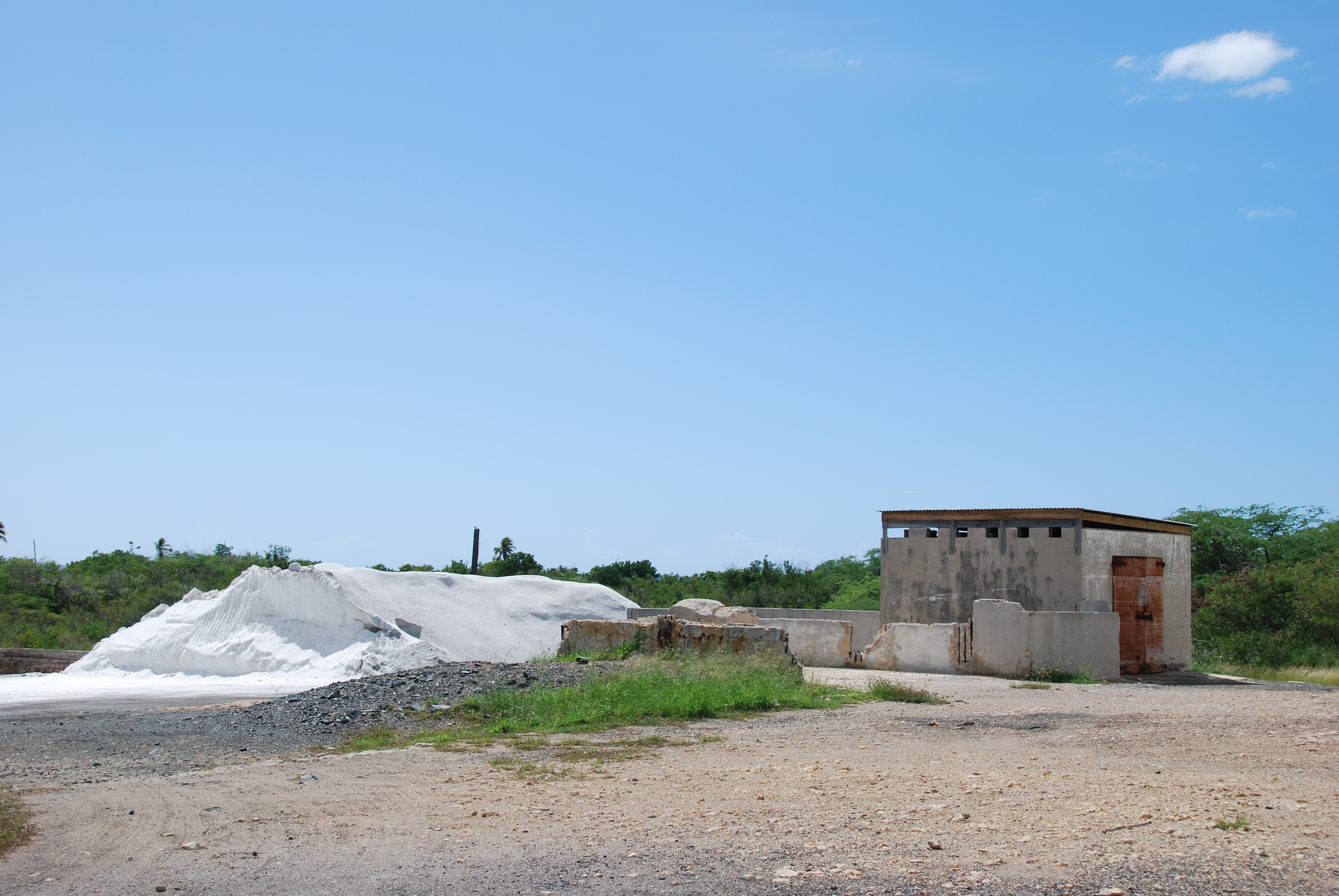

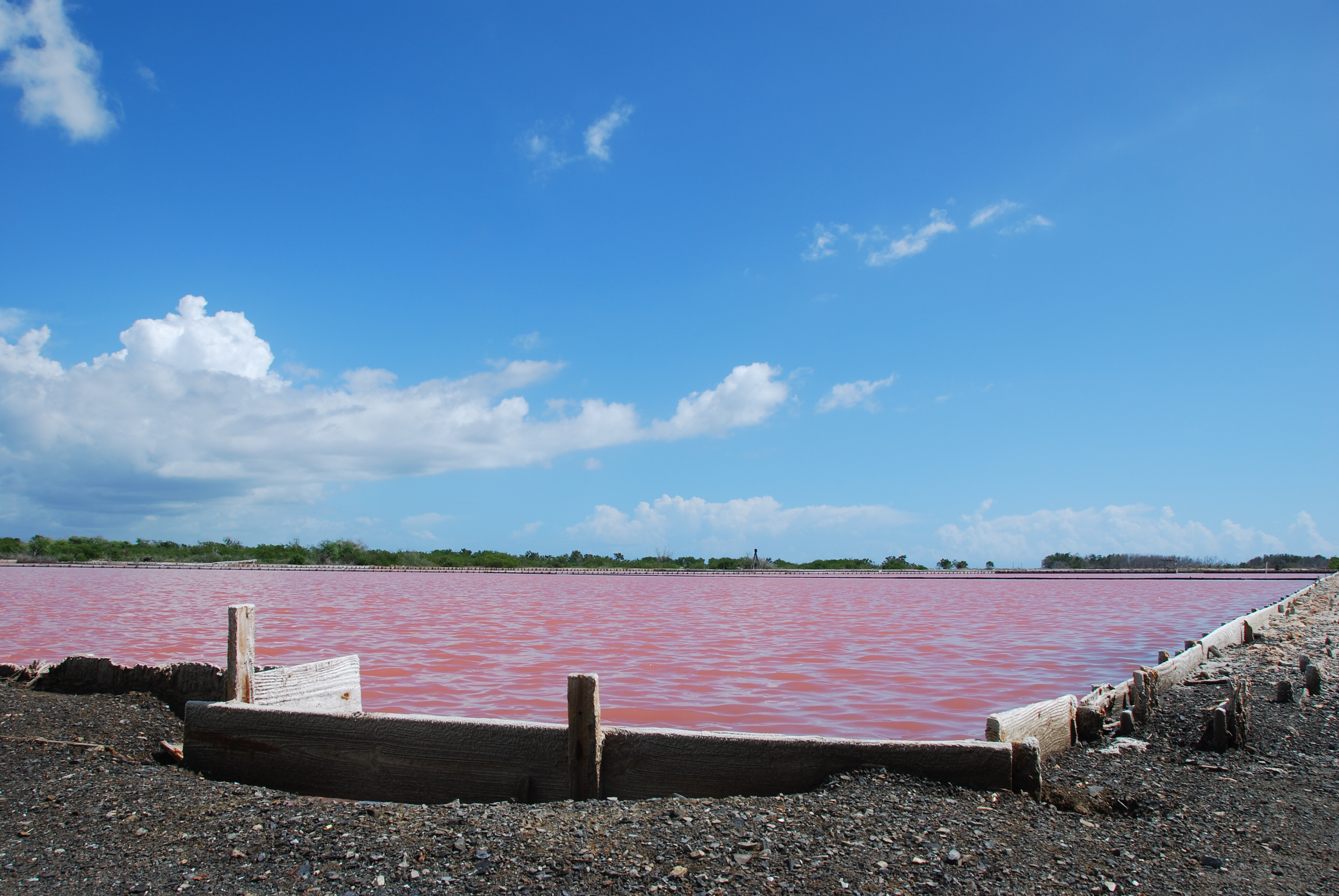

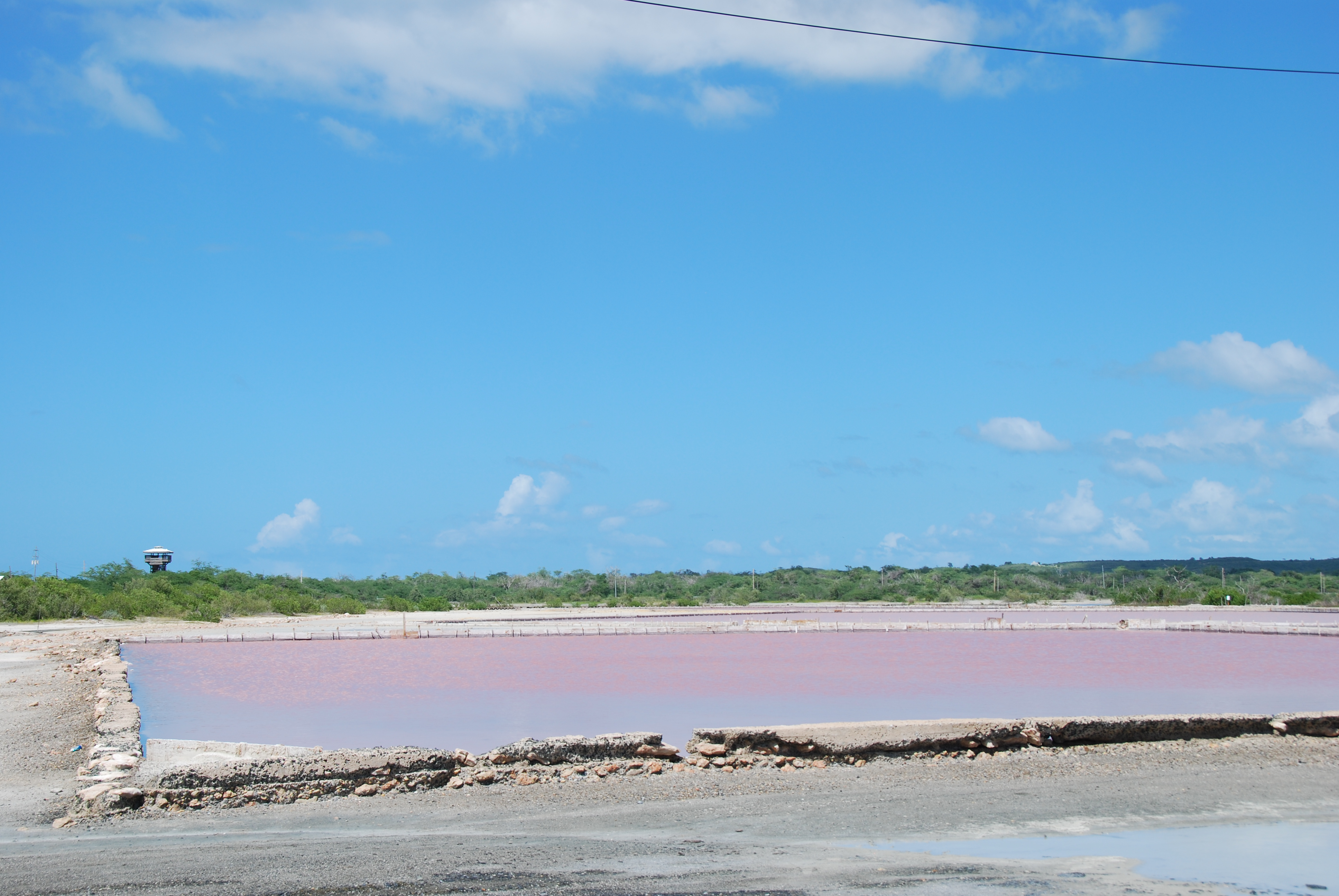

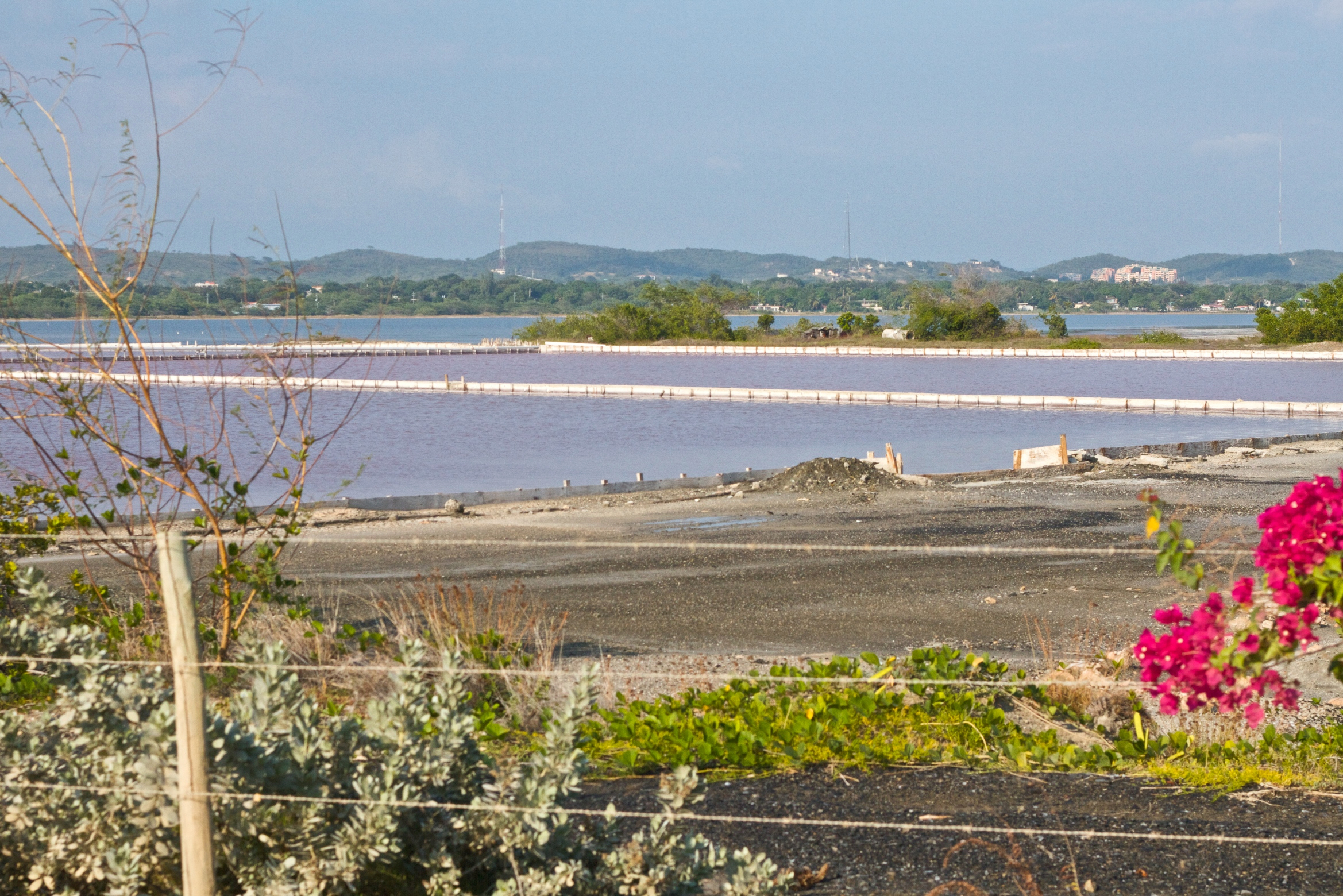

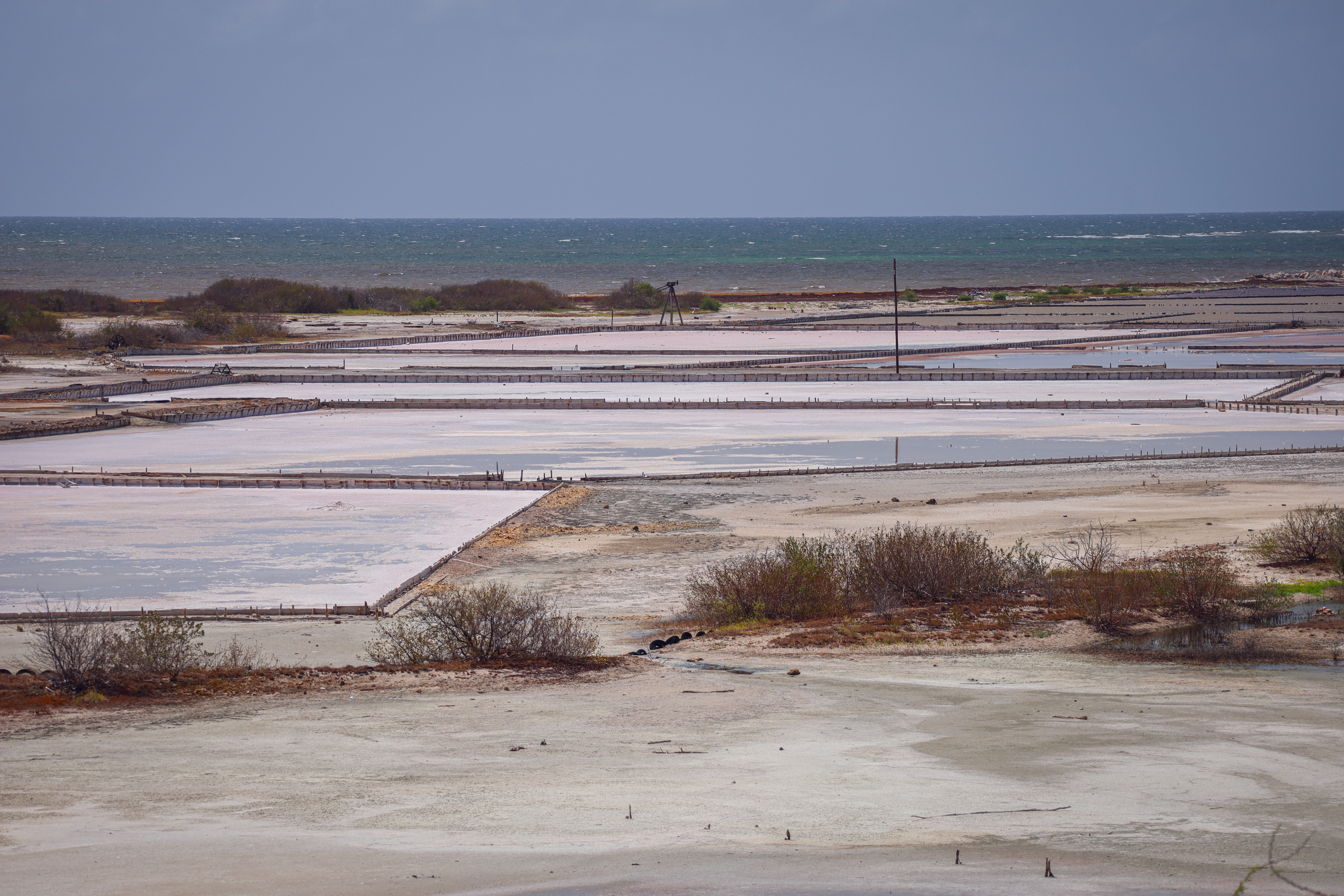

== Geography ==
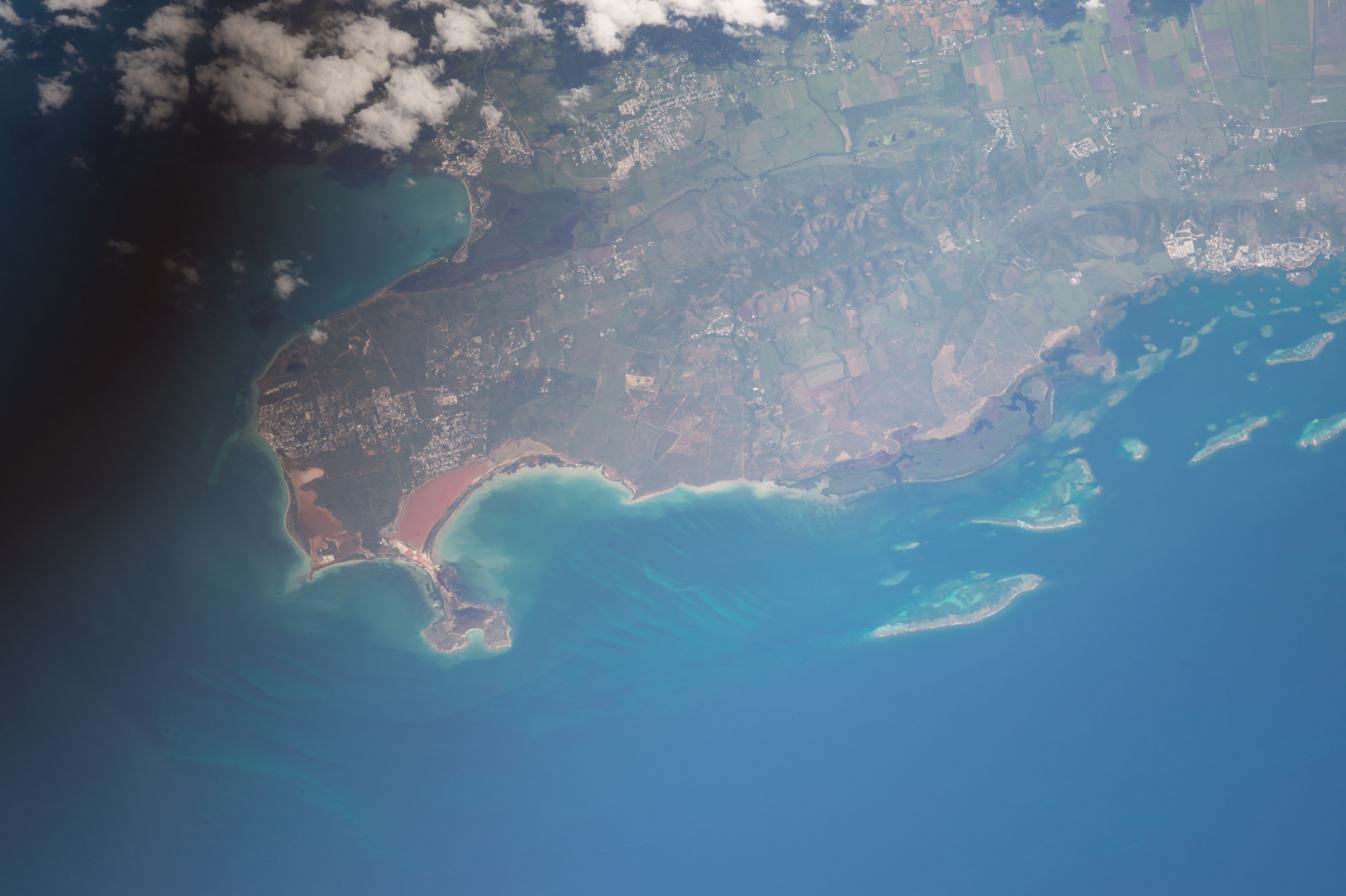
Satellite view of southwestern Puerto Rico, including Cabo Rojo. The two large lagoons, Candelaria in the west and Fraternidad in the east, are the focal geographical features around which the protected wildlife habitats are protected.

Located in the southwestern tip of Puerto Rico, the Cabo Rojo National Wildlife Refuge covers an area of 1,836 acres (743 hectares) of coastal plains and limestone hills characteristic of much of the southern coast of the island. As such, the refuge also serves as a re-naturalized relic of what the natural relief of the area used to be before permanent modern human settlement and the advent of the sugarcane industrial boom in the area. Most of the protected relief is coastal, with elevations not rising much more than a few dozen meters above sea level of the Sierra Bermeja foothills and in the limestone hills around the refuge headquarters near the Pole Ojea area. The most prominent geographical features within the refuge are Laguna Fraternidad (sometimes called Laguna Rosada) and Laguna Candelaria, two large hypersaline tidal lagoons which serve as the main sources of salt extraction in the area.

=== Climate ===
The refuge sits at the southwestern rain shadow of Puerto Rico, located in one of the driest and hottest regions of the island. Temperatures run relatively warm and constant throughout the year, with higher daylight numbers staying around 81–88°F (27–31°C) and a lower nighttime of 68–73°F (20–23°C). July and August usually measure as the hottest months while January and February are the coolest, although temperatures rarely dip below 67°F (19°C) during that time. Relative to the rest of the island, rainfall is seasonal (May through November, corresponding with the hurricane or wet season) and uncommon in the area, with annual average measurements staying between 20 and 40 inches. As such, the main habitat in the area is classified as subtropical dry forest.

=== Geology ===
The refuge is located in the western zone of the Southern Karst Belt of Puerto Rico, an area consisting of limestone and serpentine rock formations dating to the Late Jurassic and Early Cretaceous periods, and some of the rock formation within the refuge are among the oldest exposed rock in the Caribbean. The salt flats and the limestone volcaniclastic shoreline within the refuge (as the Morrillos area nearby) also form part of the yellowish-orange Ponce Limestone and Cotuí Limestone geological formations.

=== Hypersaline lagoons ===
The most prominent geographical feature in the refuge are the two hypersaline tidal lagoons around which the salt extraction industry developed in the area. Fraternidad Lagoon (Laguna Fraternidad), also known as the Pink Lagoon (Laguna Rosada) due to the pink color of its salt flats, is the largest of the two. It is located along the southeastern flank of Los Morrillos and separated from Bahía Sucia (and the Caribbean Sea) by a narrow strip of land that connects the salt flats area in the west with the eastern refuge dry forest, and the Pitahaya area of the Boquerón State Forest further to the east. Candelaria Lagoon (Laguna Candelaria), the smaller of the two, is located along the northwestern flank of Los Morrillos and separated from Bahía Salinas (and the Mona Passage) by another narrow strip of line that connects to El Combate area. The high levels of salinity of the lagoons is due to the fast evaporation of their tidal waters in an area of high occurrence of salt crystallization. The process not only helps produce salt in higher quantities but also is ideal for brine shrimp (Artemia franciscana), larvae and other aquatic microscopic life which in turns attracts large numbers of birds.

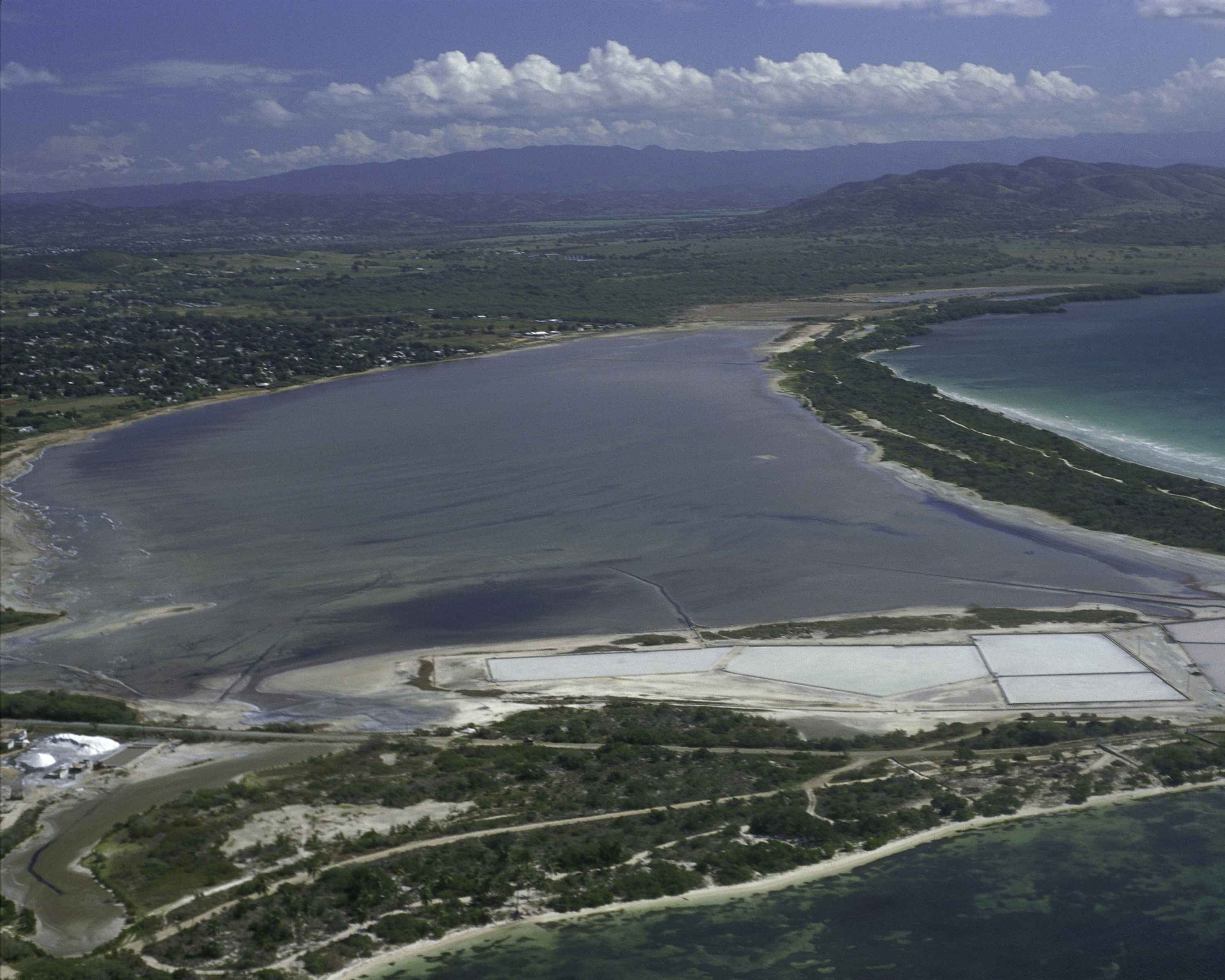

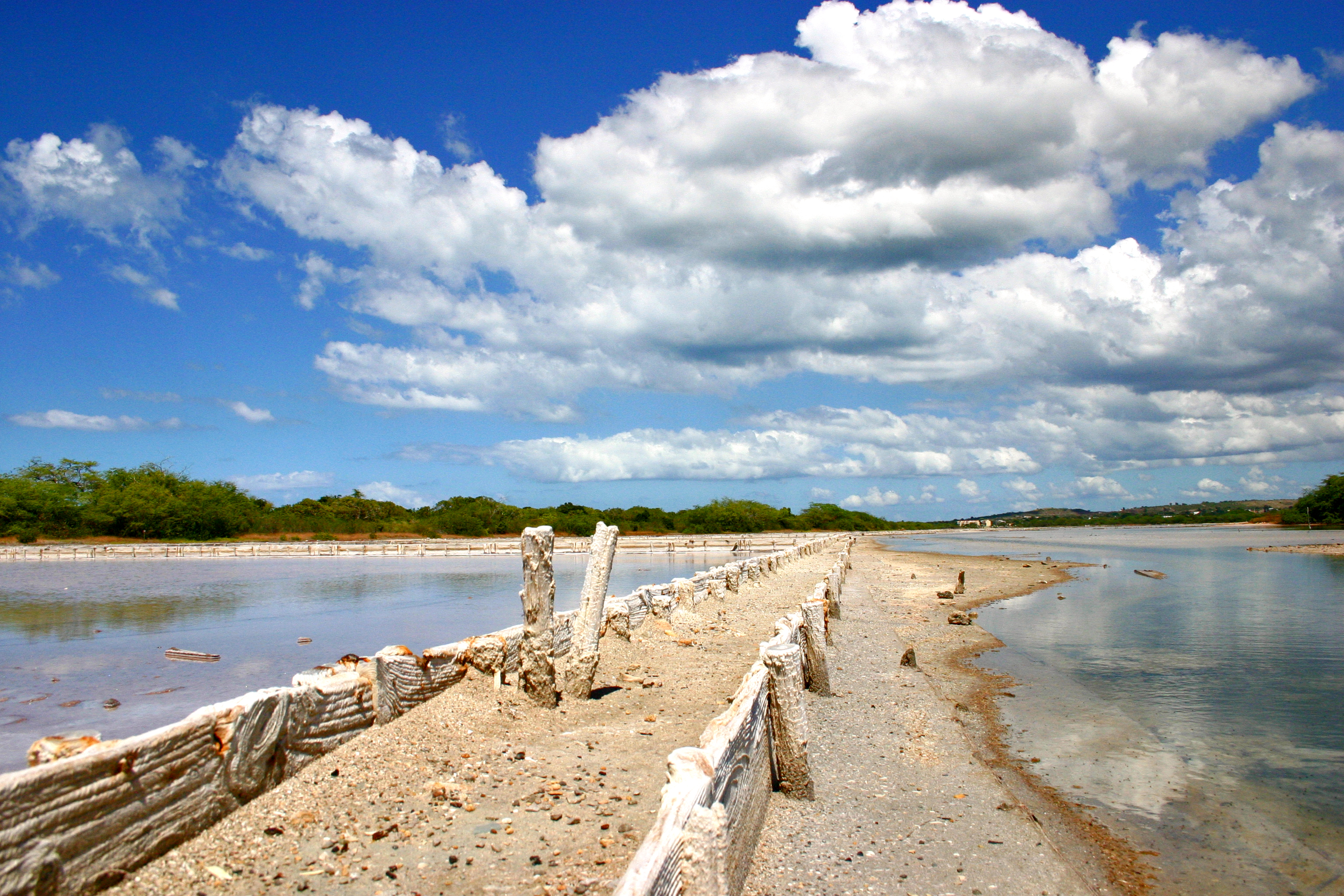

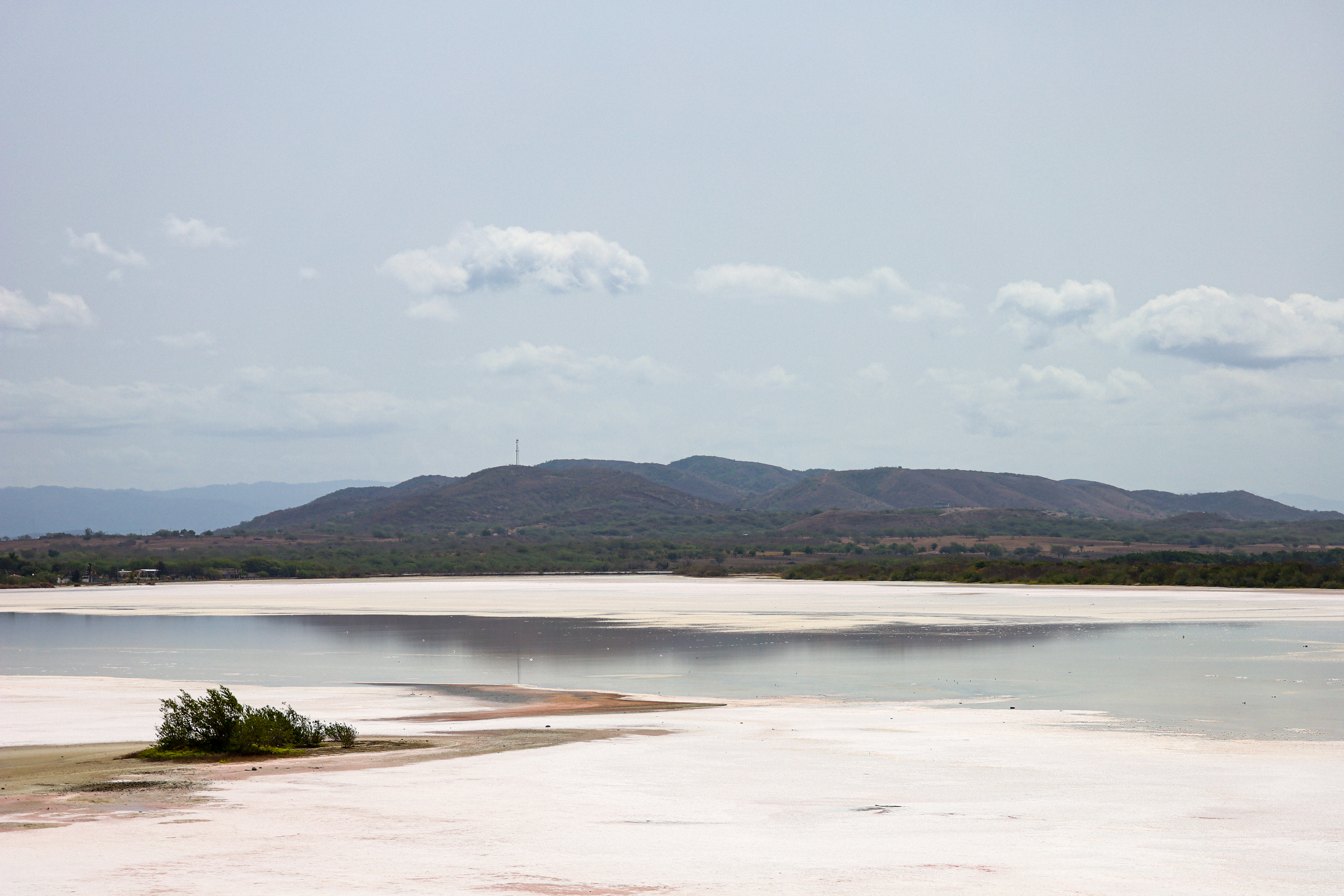

== Ecology ==
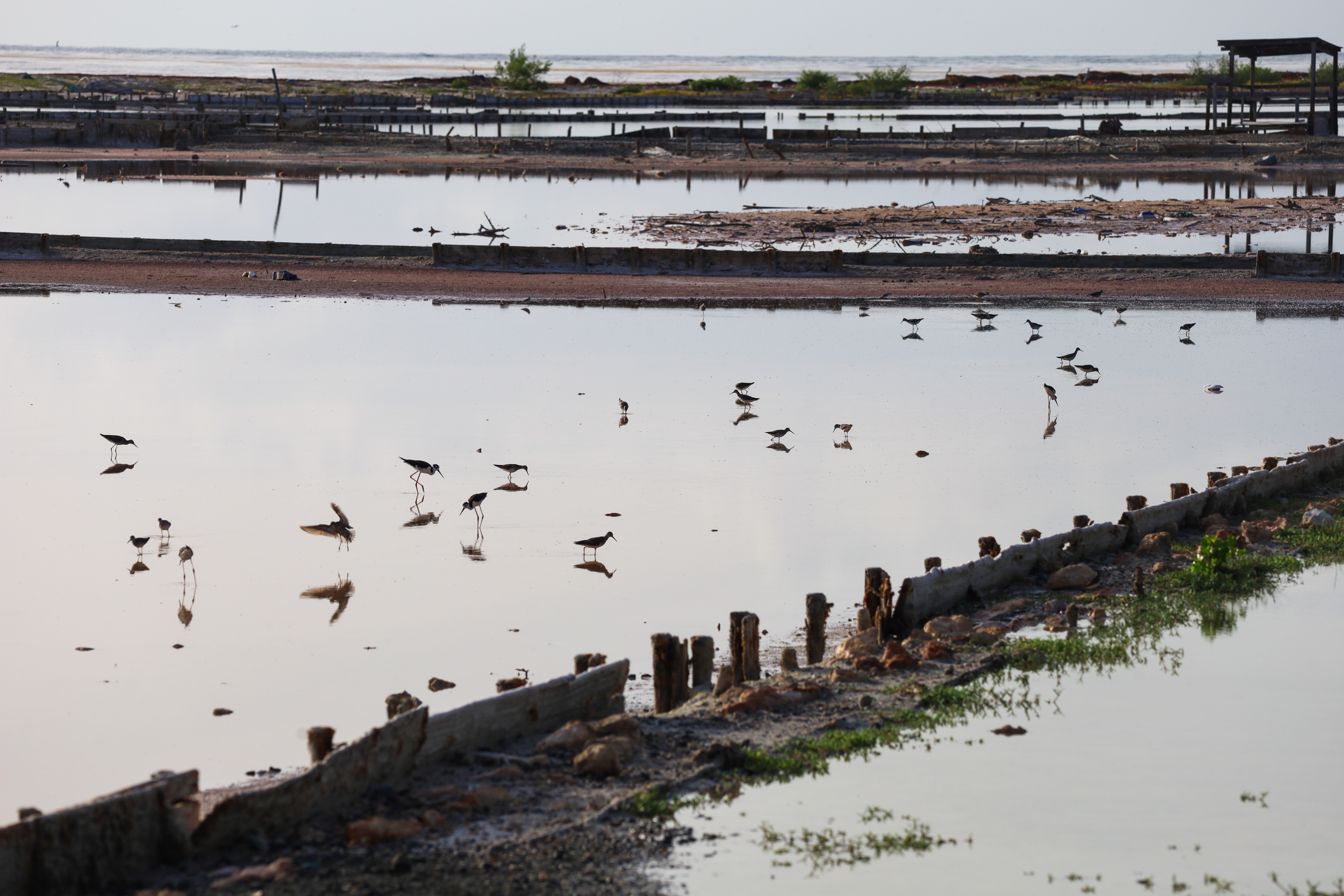
The salt pans attract numerous bird species.

The Cabo Rojo National Wildlife Refuge was established to protect the rolling hills, grasslands, mangroves and subtropical dry forests of Cabo Rojo. Due to decades of overgrazing, much of the native vegetation has been replaced by plants from other regions. Invasive species like the grasses that feed cattle are considered undesirable because they compete with the native vegetation, reducing diversity and therefore decreasing optimal food and nesting habitat for the native wildlife. Grassland management, through haying, has allowed native grasses to grow back and provide a better home for the native fauna. Additionally, native trees are being planted to return the land to its original mature hardwood forest.

The natural relief of the refuge consists approximately of 65% forest (including both mangrove and dry forest) and 35% grassland. Its mangrove forests are home to all four mangrove species that occur in Puerto Rico: red (Rhizophora mangle), black (Avicennia germinans), white (Languncularia racemosa) and buttonwood (Conocarpus erectus).

=== Wildlife ===
Cabo Rojo National Refuge is home to 245 plant species and 145 bird species, including shore and land birds. Some of the bird species found in the refuge include the American kestrel (Falco sparverius), the smooth-billed ani (Crotophaga ani), the black-necked stilt (Himantopus mexicanus), the yellow or mangrove warbler (Setophaga petechia), the Adelaide's warbler (Setophaga adelaidae), the troupial (Icterus icterus) which was introduced from Venezuela, the semipalmated plover (Charadrius semipalmatus), the Wilson's plover (Charadrius wilsonia) and the Puerto Rican woodpecker (Melanerpes portoricensis).

The refuge is also home to a large number of endemic reptiles and amphibians such as the Puerto Rican red-eyed frog (Eleutherodactylus antillensis), the Cuban tree frog (Osteopilus septentrionalis) and the white-lipped frog (Leptodactylus albilabris). Native plants found in the refuge include the cobana negra (Stahlia monosperma), the pipe-organ cactus (Cephalocerus royenii), the West Indian birch (Bursera simaruba) and the guayacan (Guaiacum officinale).

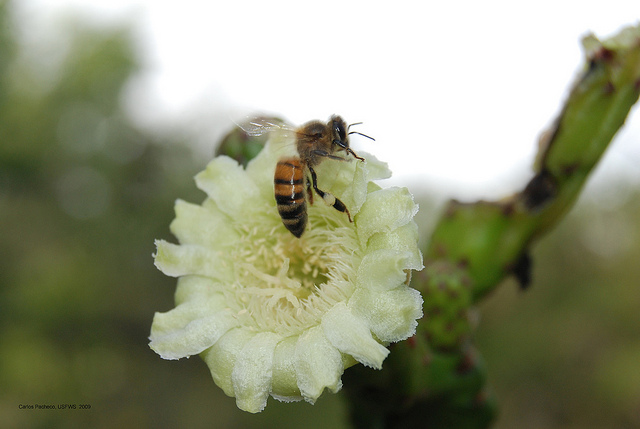
Bee on Leptocerus grantianus.

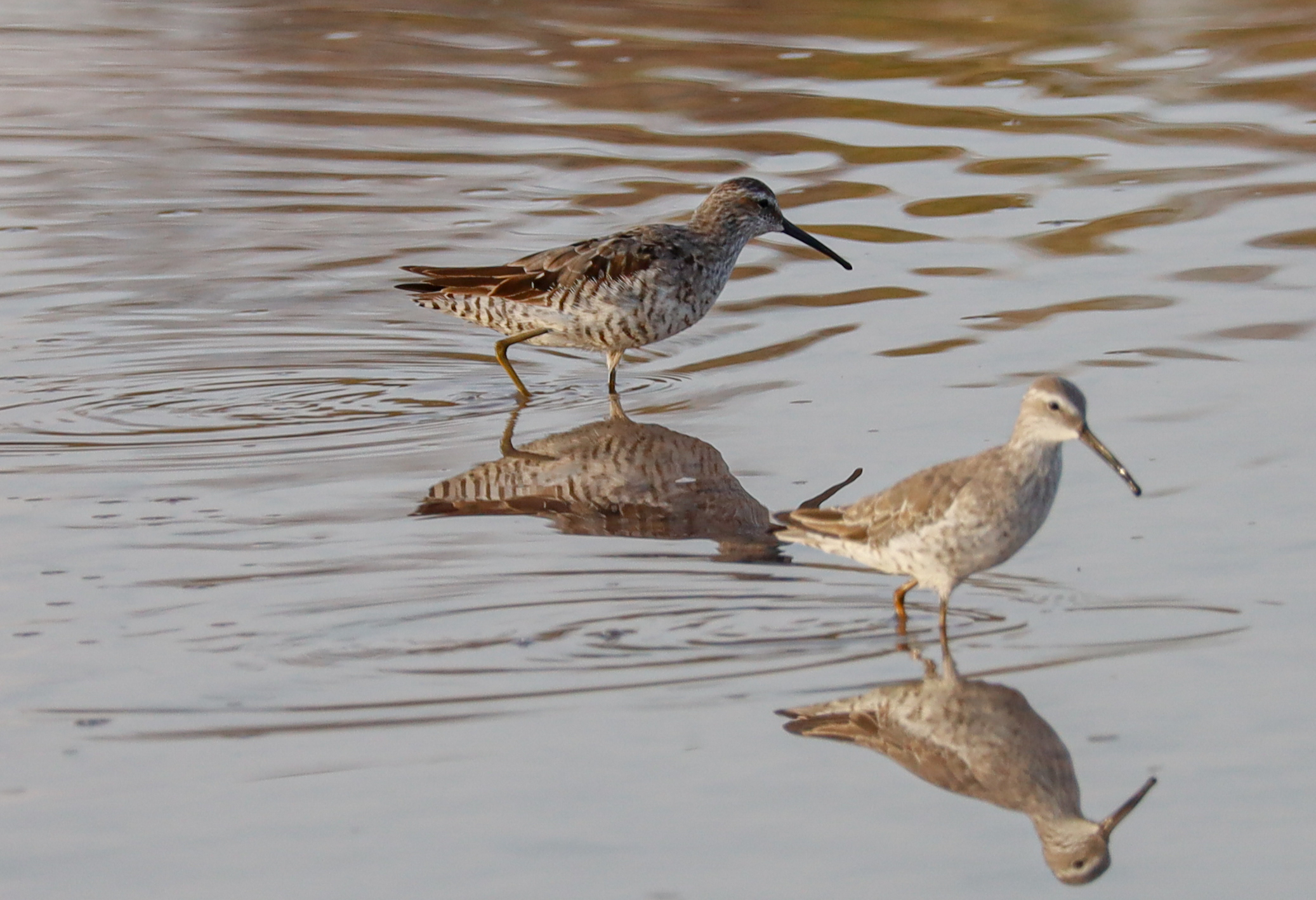
Stilt sandpipers (Calidris himantopus)

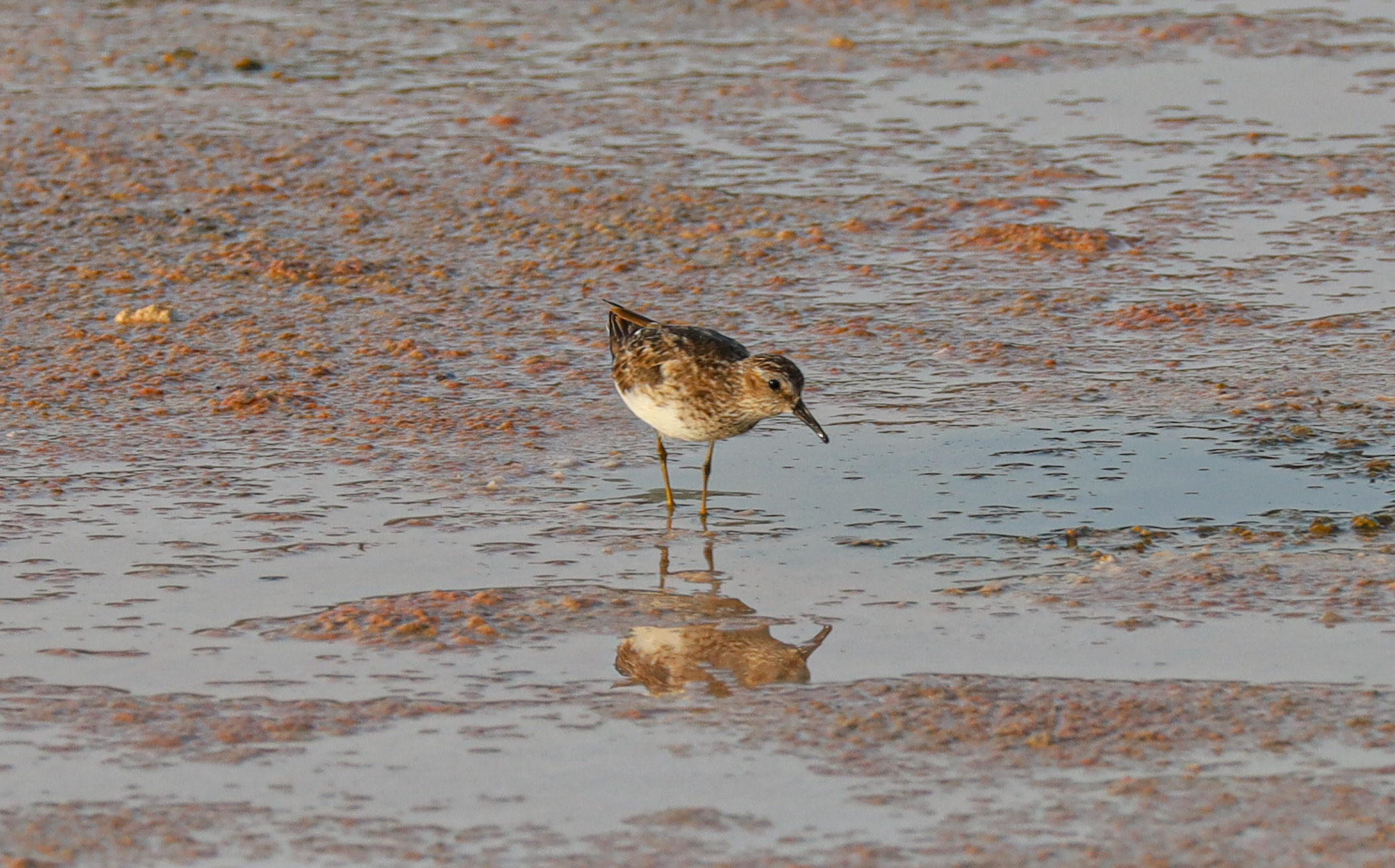
Least sandpiper (Calidris minutilla) in a salt pan

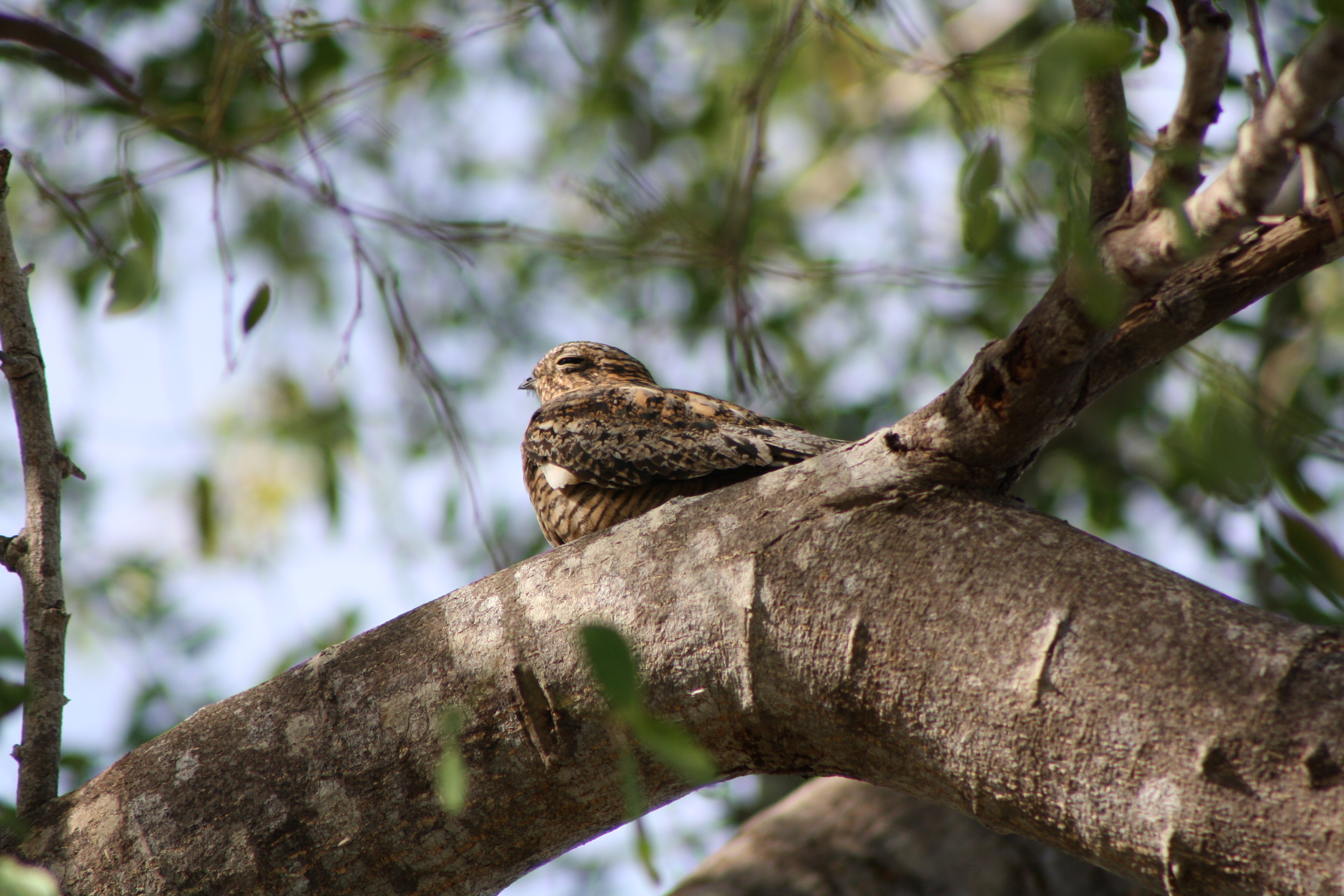
Antillean nighthawk (Chordeiles gundlachii)

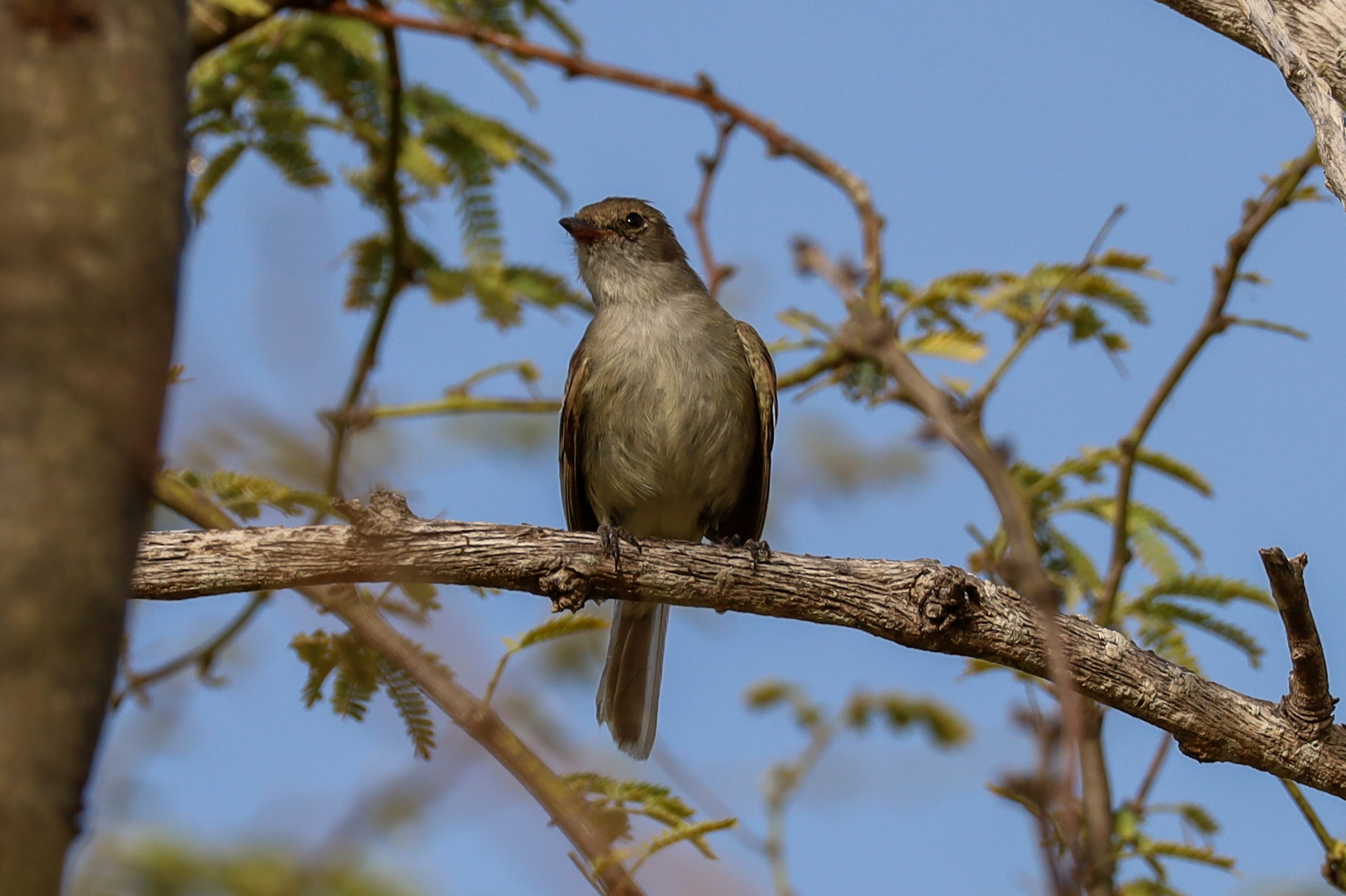
Caribbean elaenia (Elaenia martinica)

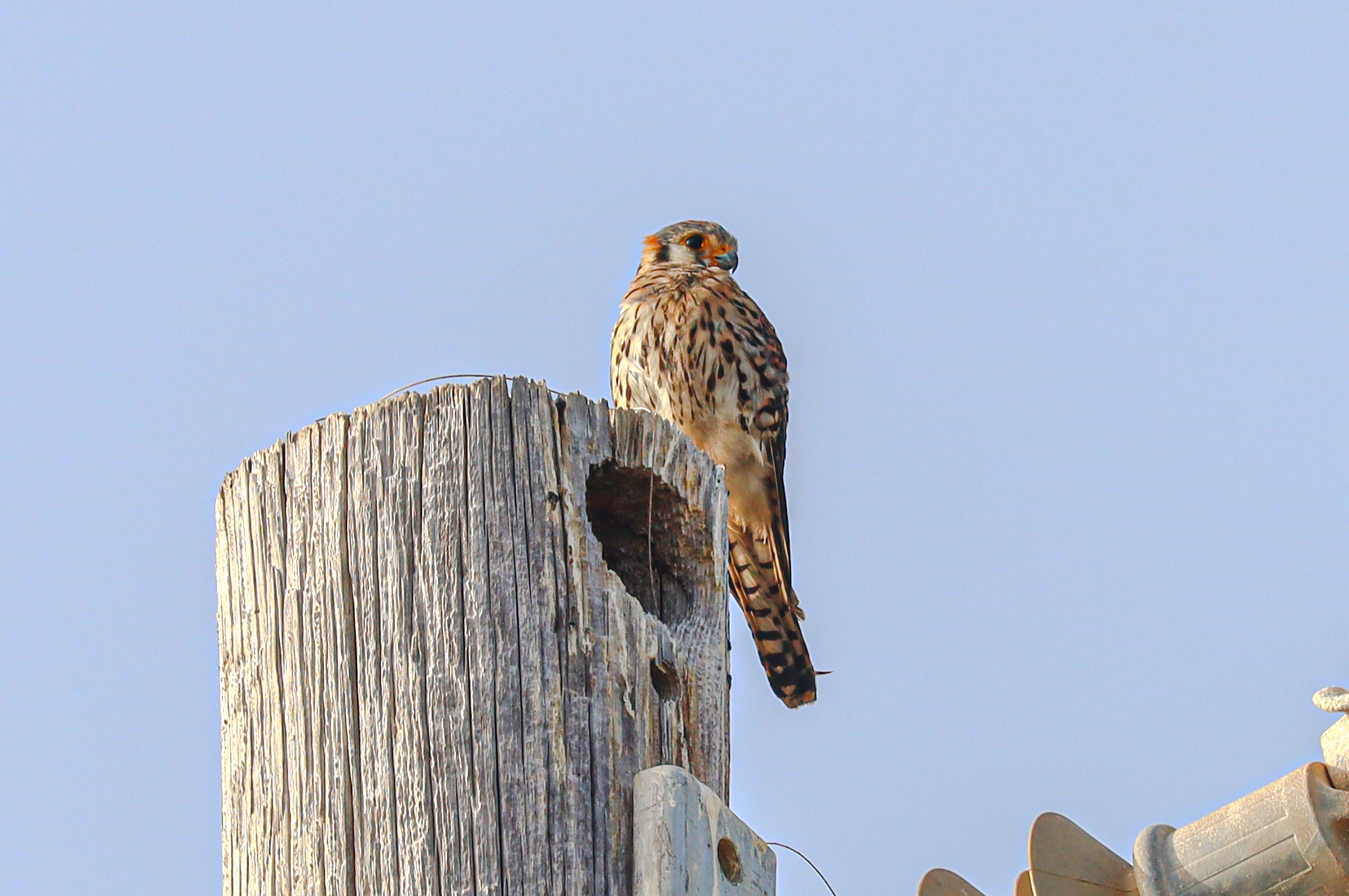
American kestrel (Falco sparverius caribaearum)

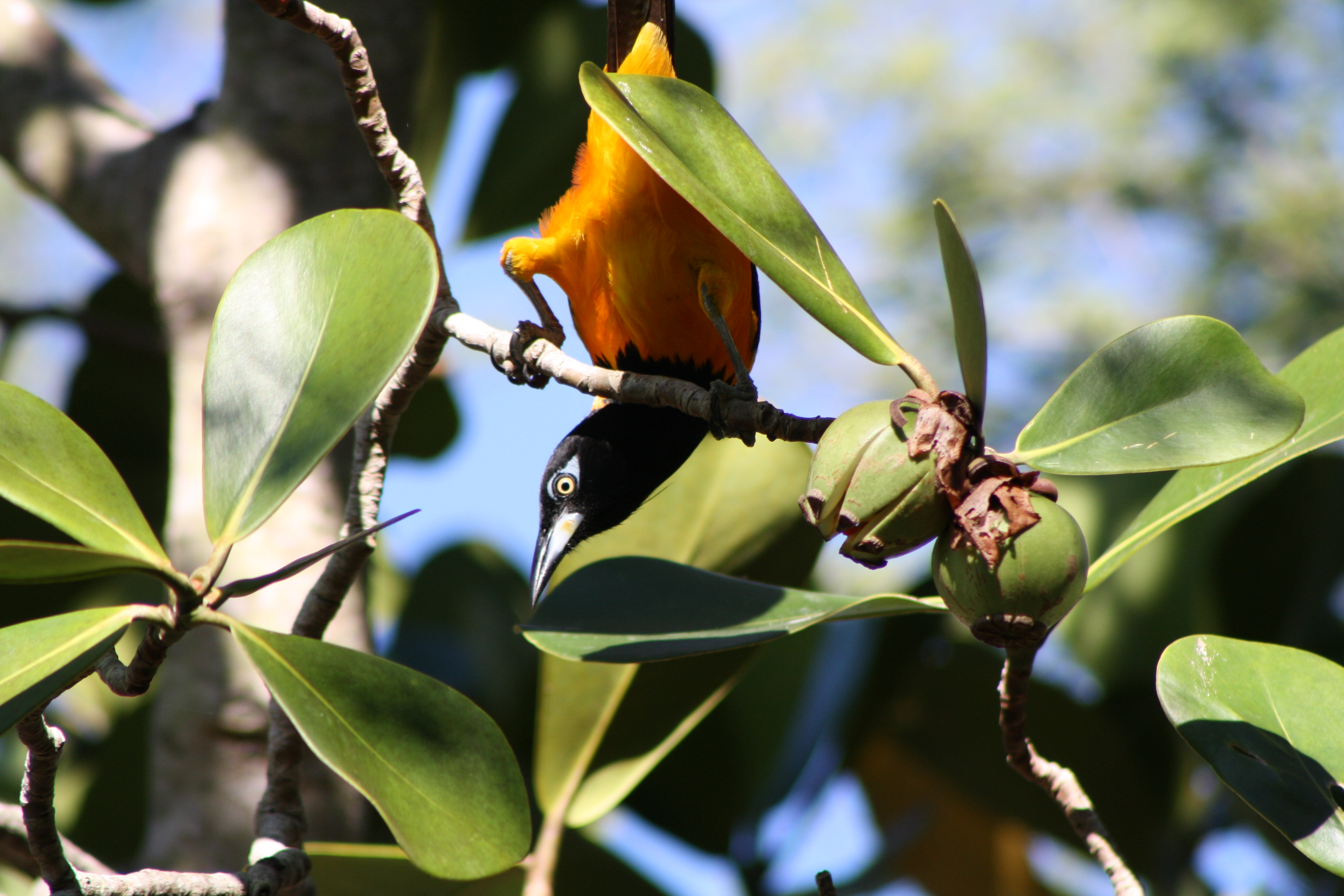
Venezuelan troupial (Icterus icterus)

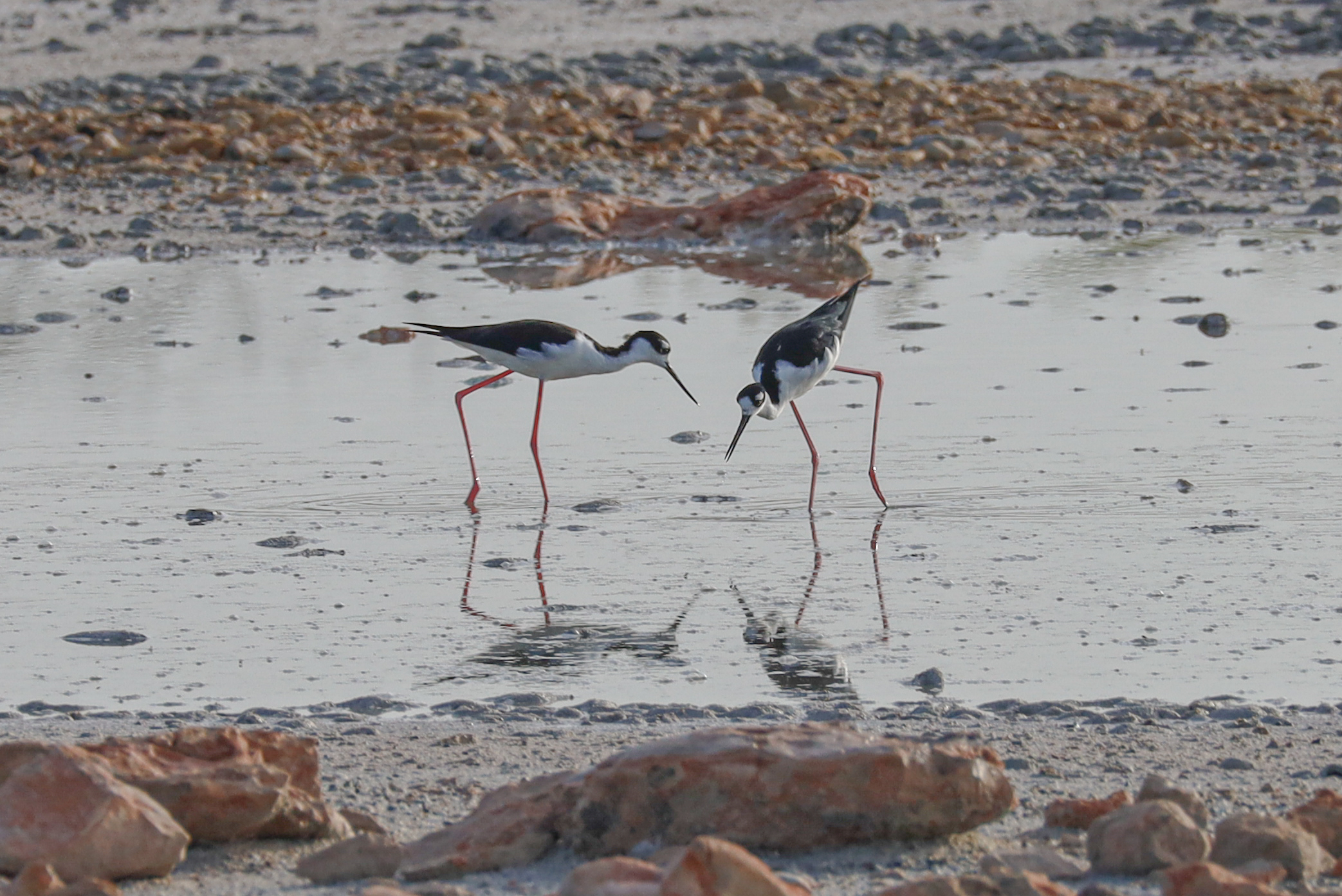
Black-necked stilts (Himantopus mexicanus) in a salt pan

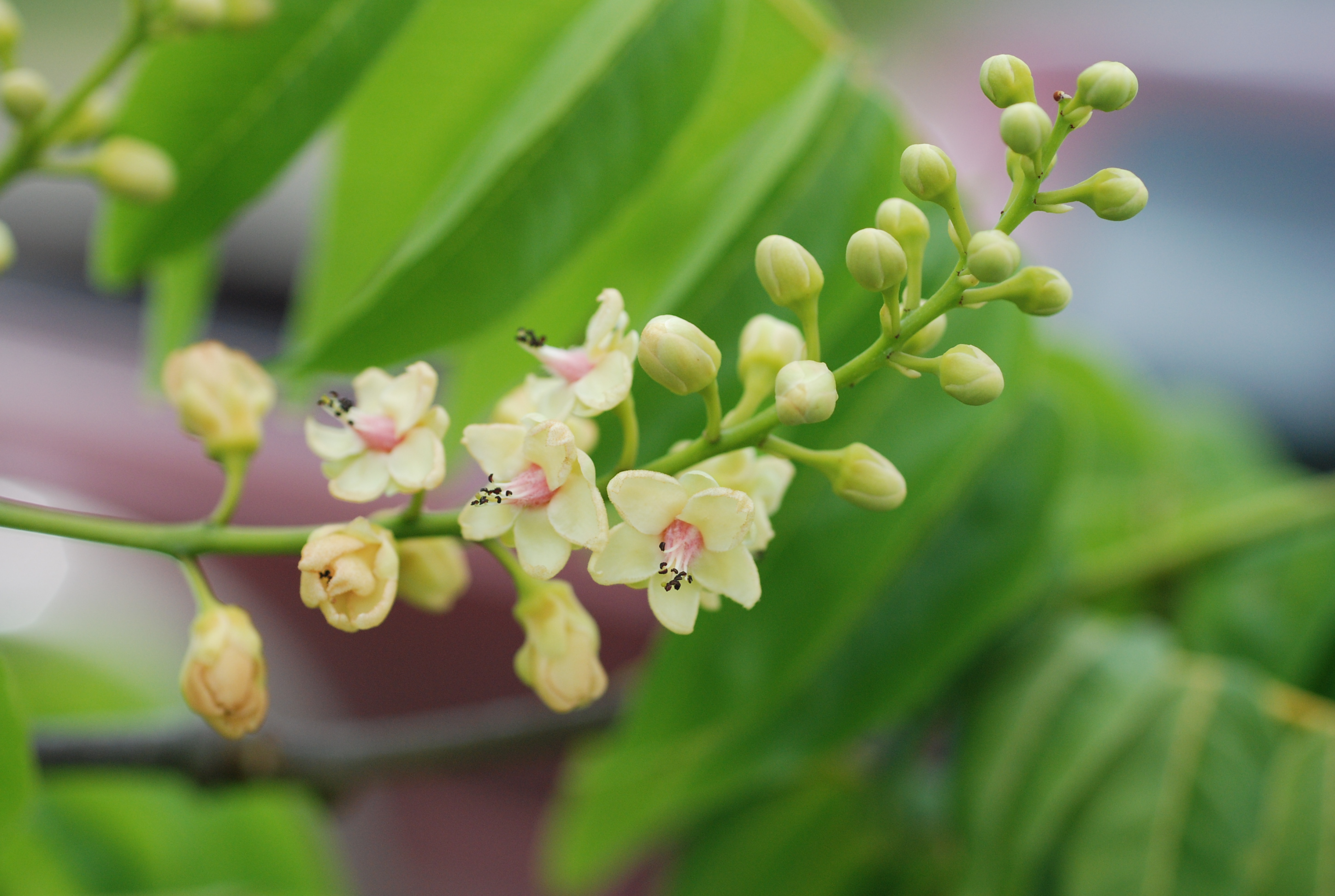
Stahlia monosperma flower

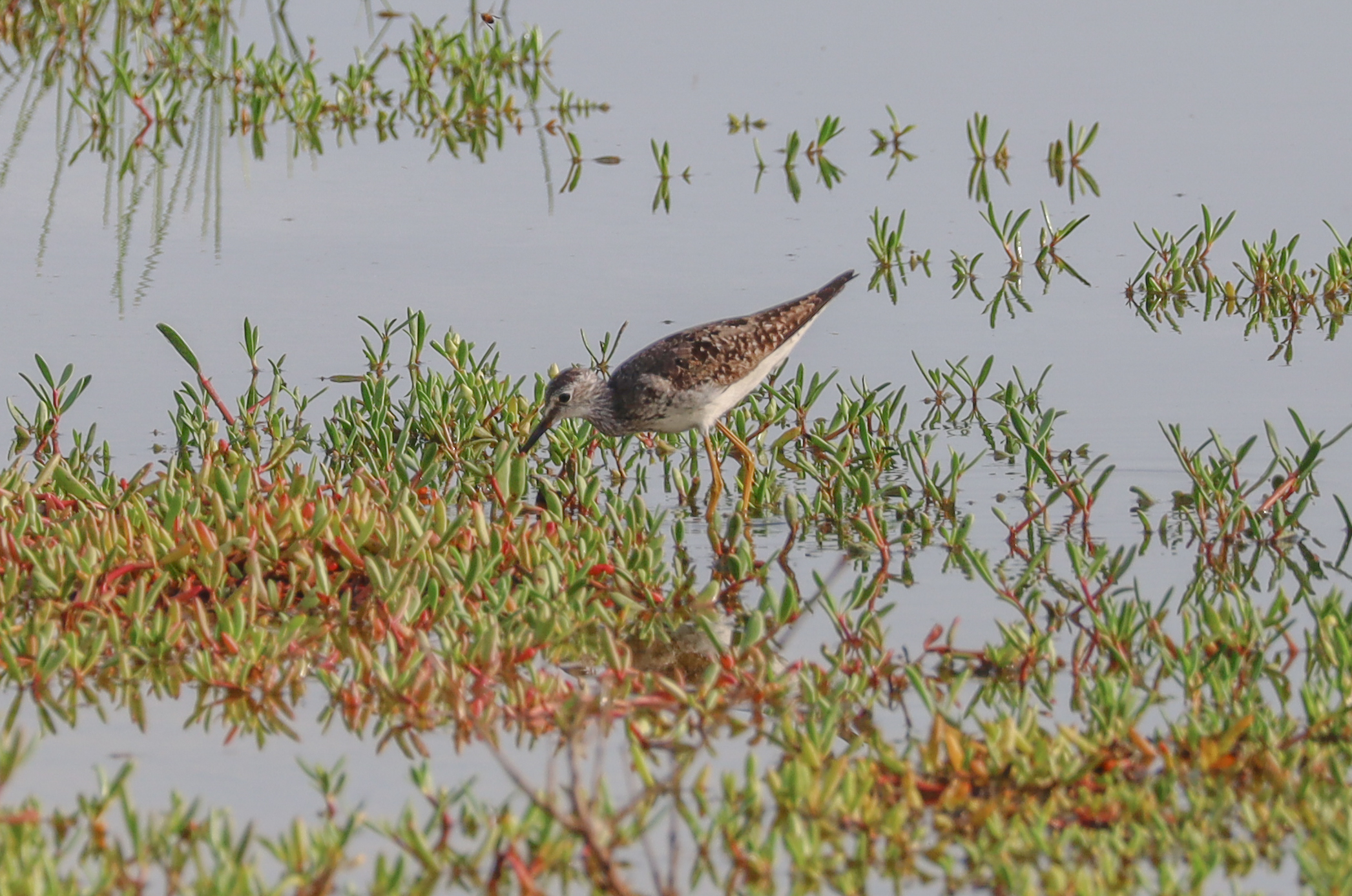
Lesser yellowlegs (Tringa flavipes)

== Visiting ==
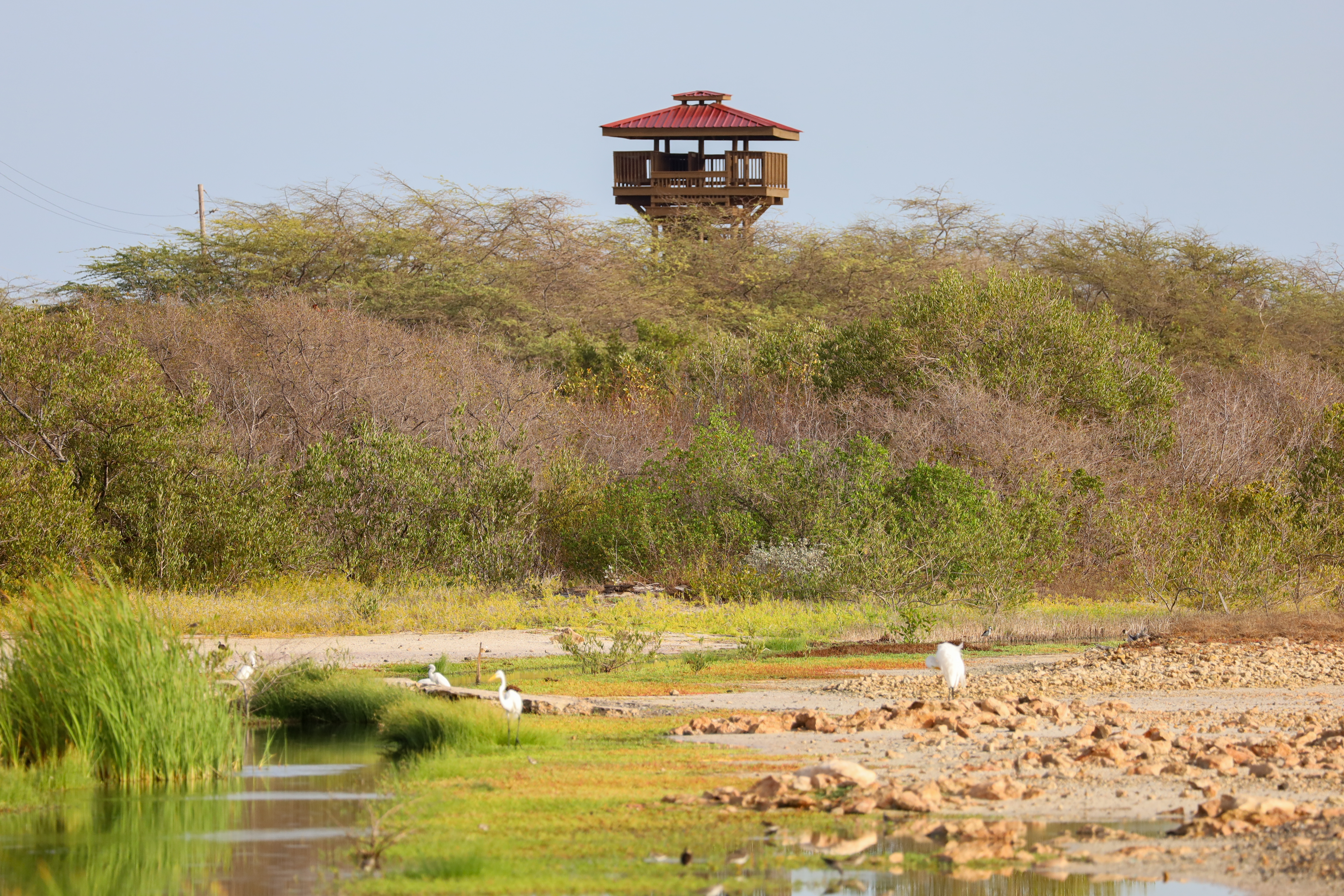
Salinas de Cabo Rojo observation tower.

The Cabo Rojo National Wildlife Refuge is open year-round from sunrise to sunset. While the National Wildlife Refuge (NWR) headquarters and visitor center is currently closed for renovation work (as of July of 2026), the locally-managed Las Salinas Interpretative Center (Centro Interpretativo Las Salinas) located in the salt flats area on PR-301 is open Wednesday through Saturday from 8:00 AM to 3:30 PM. This visitor center contains information, bathrooms, an observation tower and runs tours and educational programs.

Along with hiking and biking, birdwatching is one of the primary activities that attract numerous visitors from both Puerto Rico and overseas, particularly during migration season and the wintering months where high numbers of bird species fly down on their way to South America. Along with nearby Los Morrillos and Laguna Cartagena National Wildlife Refuge, the refuge is located in a prominent and iconic location for migrating birds along the southeastern edge of the Atlantic Flyway, providing temporary refuge to birds crossing the Atlantic Ocean and Caribbean Sea. In addition to the yellow-winged blackbird, a rare, endangered and endemic bird that is mostly found in southwestern Puerto Rico year-round, the refuge is also home to numerous waterbird and warbler species during migration season that are often not seen in other areas of the island.

=== Hiking ===
Hiking is another popular activity within the refuge which has hundreds of miles of trails and boardwalks throughout its units:

Trail name	Type	Length	Est. time	Difficulty	Trailheads	Activities allowed	Notes
Bird Observation Trail	point to point	0.34 mi	1 hour	easy	Las Salinas Interpretative Center	Biking, birding, dog walking, education programs, photography, ranger-led programs, wildlife watching	Trail with bird watching interpretation which connects to the Interpretative Trail.
Butterfly Trail	point to point	0.48 mi	1 hour	easy	Las Salinas Interpretative Center	Biking, birding, dog walking, education programs, photography, ranger-led programs, wildlife watching	Northward trail connecting Las Salinas Interpretative Center to the historic salt mining ruins and the Interpretative Trail at Candelaria Lagoon.
Interpretative Trail	point to point	0.98 mi	1 hour	easy	El Combate Beach (north), Las Salinas Interpretative Center (south)	Biking, birding, dog walking, education programs, photography, ranger-led programs, wildlife watching	Trail providing access to Candelaria Lagoon, its historic salt mining ruins, and an observation tower which offers views of the entire lagoon and the western salt flats.
Observation Tower Trail	loop	1.40 mi	1.5 hours	easy	NWR headquarters and visitor center	Birding, dog walking, education programs, photography, ranger-led programs, wildlife watching	Trail running through the northeastern dry forest leading to an observation tower which offers views of the nearby grasslands, shoreline and Sierra Bermeja.
Troupial Long Trail	loop	1.43 mi	1.5 hours	easy	NWR headquarters and visitor center	Birding, dog walking, education programs, photography, ranger-led programs, wildlife watching	Trail running through a dry forest and providing access to the Fraternidad Lagoon.
Troupial Short Trail	loop	0.86 mi	1 hour	easy	NWR headquarters and visitor center	Birding, dog walking, education programs, photography, ranger-led programs, wildlife watching	Shorter tract of the Troupial Long Trail.

=== Biking ===
A point-to-point 4.73-mile long trail designated exclusively for biking can be found in the interpretative center of Las Salinas (Centro Interpretativo Las Salinas) and the El Combate trailhead. Biking is also permitted in some of the other trails within the refuge: the Bird Observation, Butterfly and Interpretative trails.

=== Beaches ===
Large portions of El Combate Beach (Playa El Combate) are protected and located within the refuge boundaries, specifically the portion located on the strip of land adjacent to the northwestern shore of Candelaria Lagoon. Numerous trailheads connect the beach to the rest of the refuge. Other beaches found within the boundaries of the refuge include Punta Águila Beach, Tres Patos Beach and Salinas Beach.

== Adjacent protected areas ==
The Cabo Rojo National Wildlife Refuge is located close to the Laguna Cartagena National Wildlife Refuge, both of which are administered as part of the Caribbean Islands National Wildlife complex. The national wildlife refuge is also adjacent to different units belonging to the Boquerón State Forest, which protects the mangrove forests that stretch from Cabo Rojo to Lajas, and the Cabo Rojo National Natural Landmark.

== See also ==
- List of National Wildlife Refuges of the United States
- List of protected areas of Puerto Rico
- United States Fish and Wildlife Service
