= Los Morrillos (Cabo Rojo) =

Cape and tombolo landform located in Puerto Rico

Los Morrillos de los Cabos Rojos "Los Morrillos", "Los Cabos Rojos"
- Tombolo
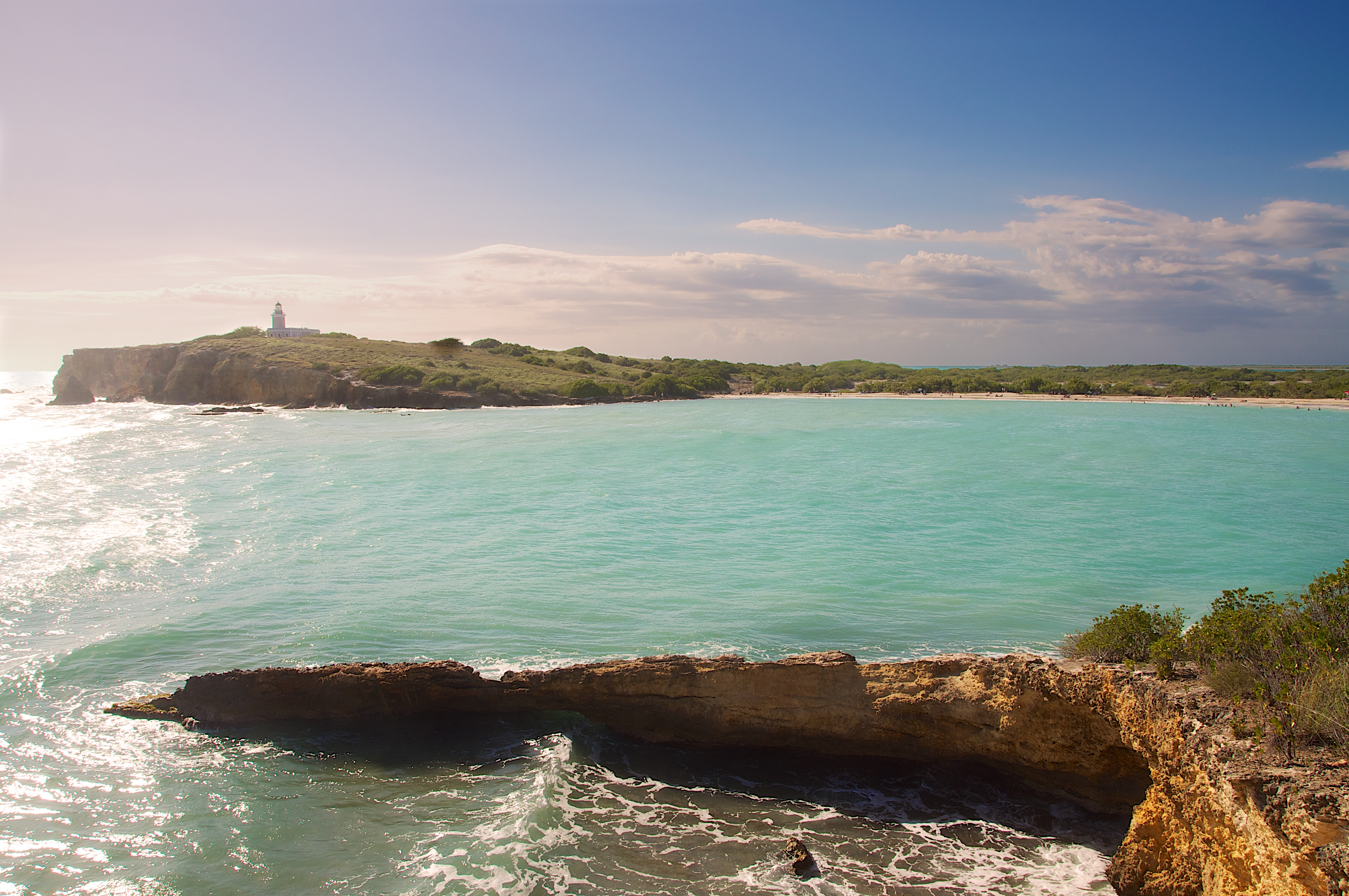
- Los Morrillos Lighthouse on the western "morrillo".

- Location within Puerto Rico
- Coordinates: 17°56′01.2″N 67°11′31.9″W
- Location: Cabo Rojo, Puerto Rico
- Elevation: 92 ft (28 m)

U.S. National Natural Landmark
- Designated: 1980

Los Morrillos de los Cabos Rojos (Spanish for "the little promontories of the red capes") or more commonly known as Los Morrillos de Cabo Rojo, is a cape and tombolo landform located in southwestern Puerto Rico in the municipality of Cabo Rojo. Los Morrillos is an excellent example of a tombolo, or a tied island, with two sand pits. The cape resembles a letter Y with its two promontories or morrillos being connected through sand pits which enclose a saltwater lagoon. The landform was designated a National Natural Landmark in 1980 (as the Cabo Rojo National Natural Landmark), and the site includes mangroves, beaches, important bird nesting areas, limestone caves, cliffs and rock formations. The reddish-colored limestone cliffs give the name to the town and municipality of Cabo Rojo.

The Los Morrillos Lighthouse (or Cabo Rojo Lighthouse) is a prominent historic landmark located in the landform. The site is located in and administered by the Boquerón State Forest and the Cabo Rojo National Wildlife Refuge.

== Location and geology ==
This landform is located in the southwestern corner of the main island of Puerto Rico, shared by the barrios Boquerón and Llanos Costa of the municipality of Cabo Rojo. The cape is south facing towards the Caribbean Sea and creates two bays: the Salinas Bay to the west and the Sucia Bay to the east. The tombolo itself is connected to the mainland through a thin isthmus containing mangroves, reefs and salt flats. The geology of the landform consists mainly of limestone and serpentine rock formations, some of which are considered amongst the oldest in Puerto Rico.

== Notable features ==
Point Jagüey (Spanish: Punta Jagüey) is the westernmost part of the landform and contains some of the most prominent cliffs. Jagüey Cave (Spanish: Cueva Jagüey), a small cave is located nearby immediately south of the point. Another prominent feature is the Puente de Tierra (Spanish for "land bridge"), a limestone formation resembling a small thin bridge. Sucia Lagoon (Spanish: Laguna Sucia) is located between the two morrillos and it contains mangrove forests and salt flats.

== Gallery ==
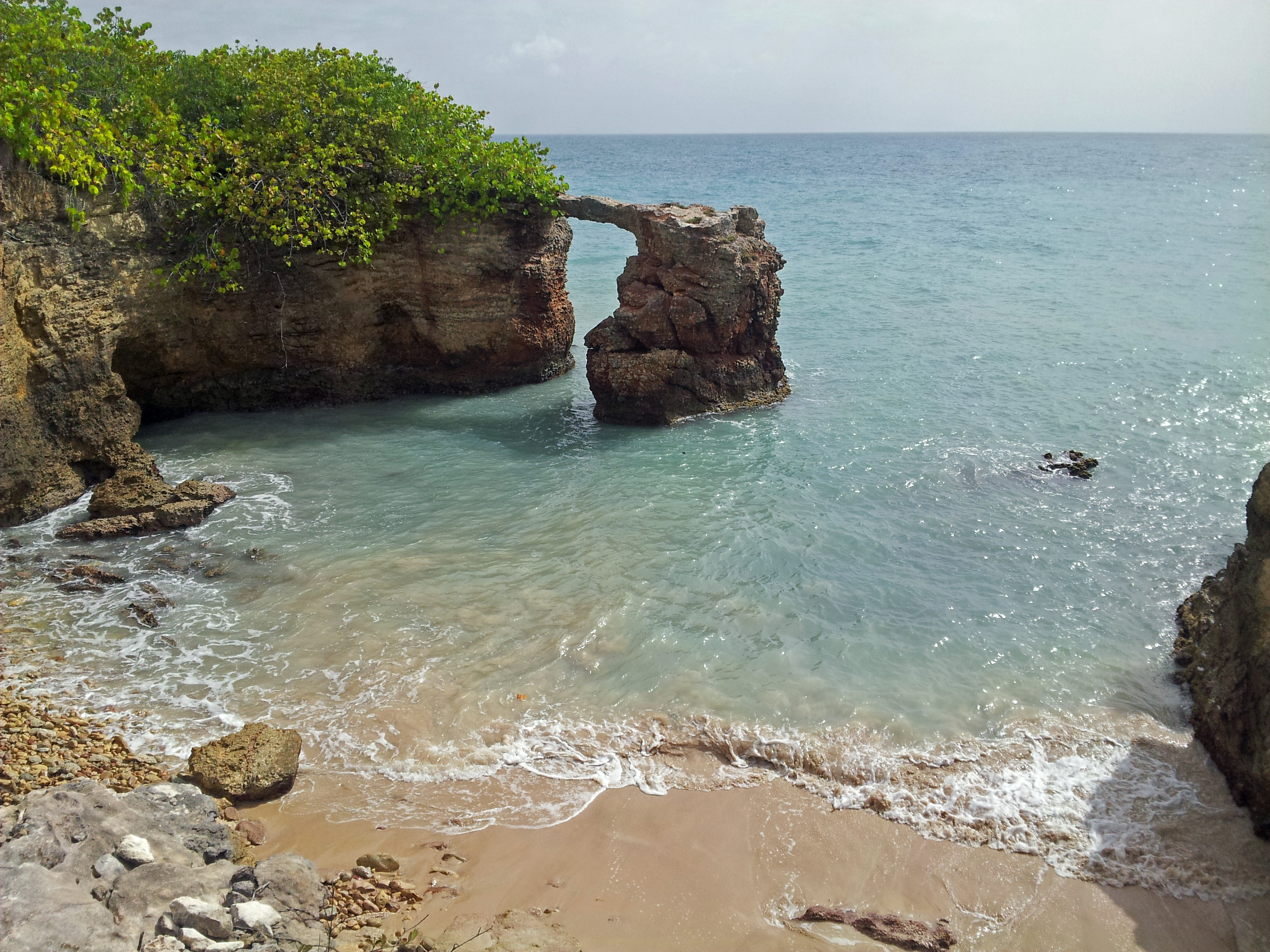
Puente de Piedra ("stone bridge").

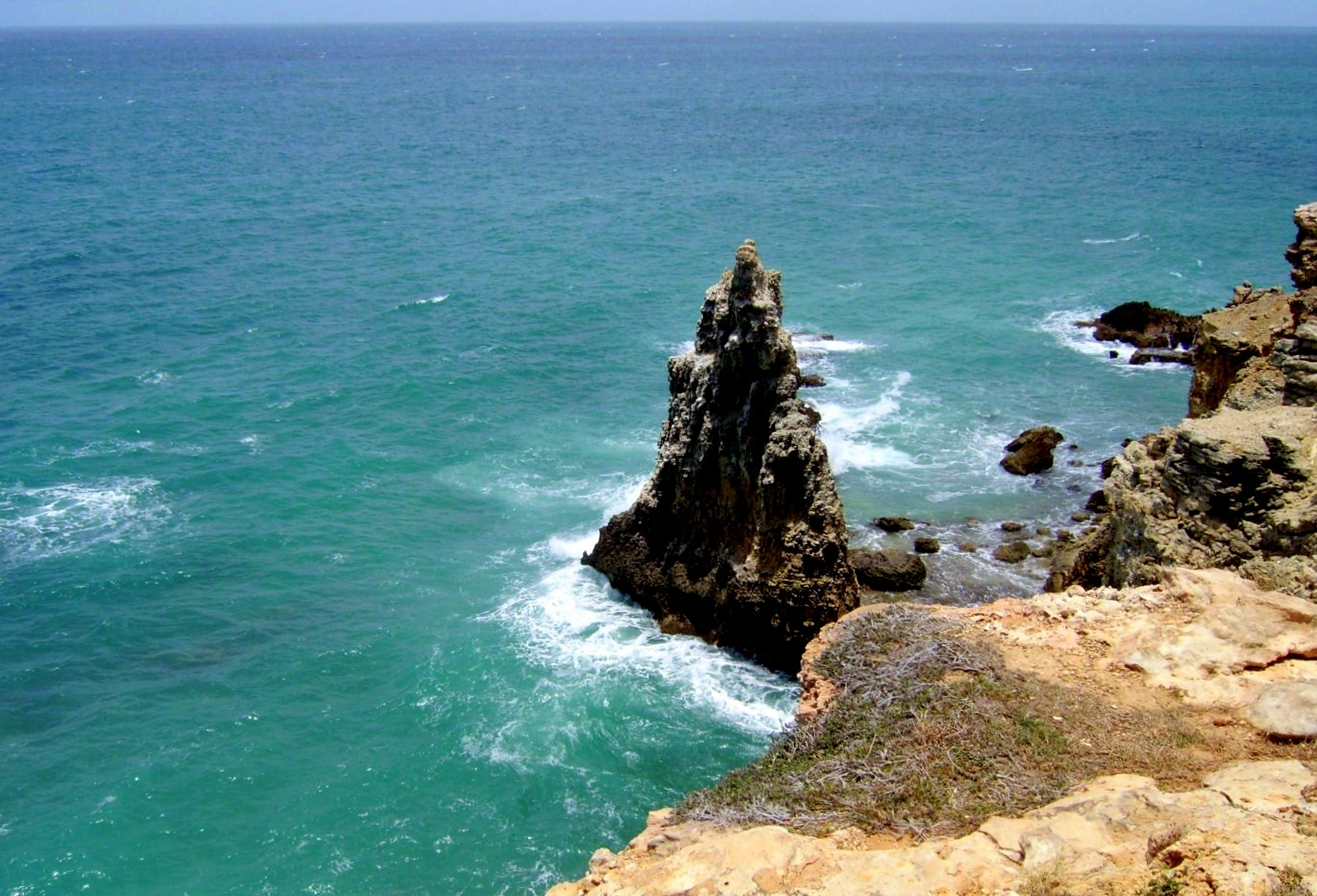
Cliff formations near the lighthouse.

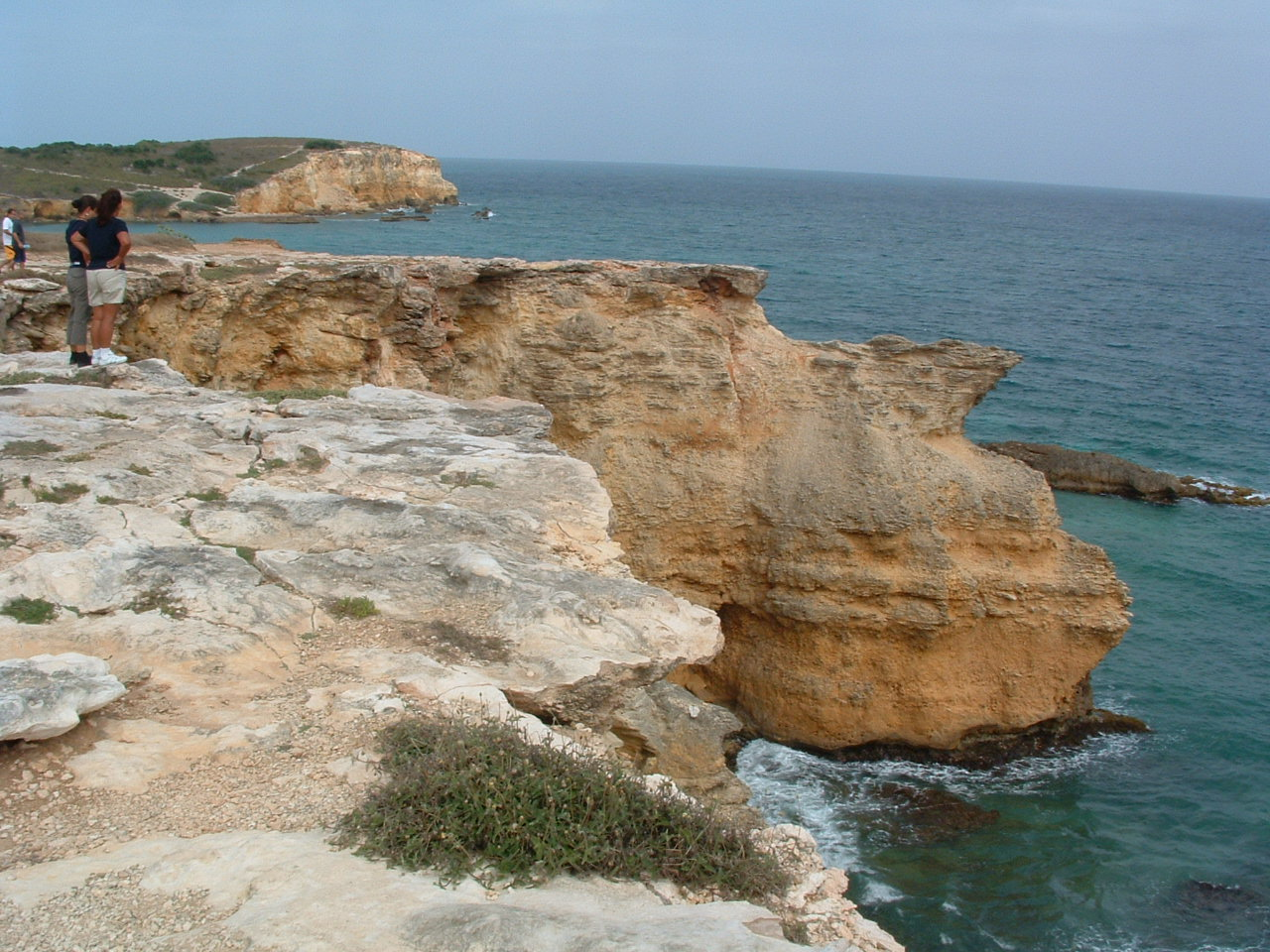
Limestone cliffs located next to the lighthouse.

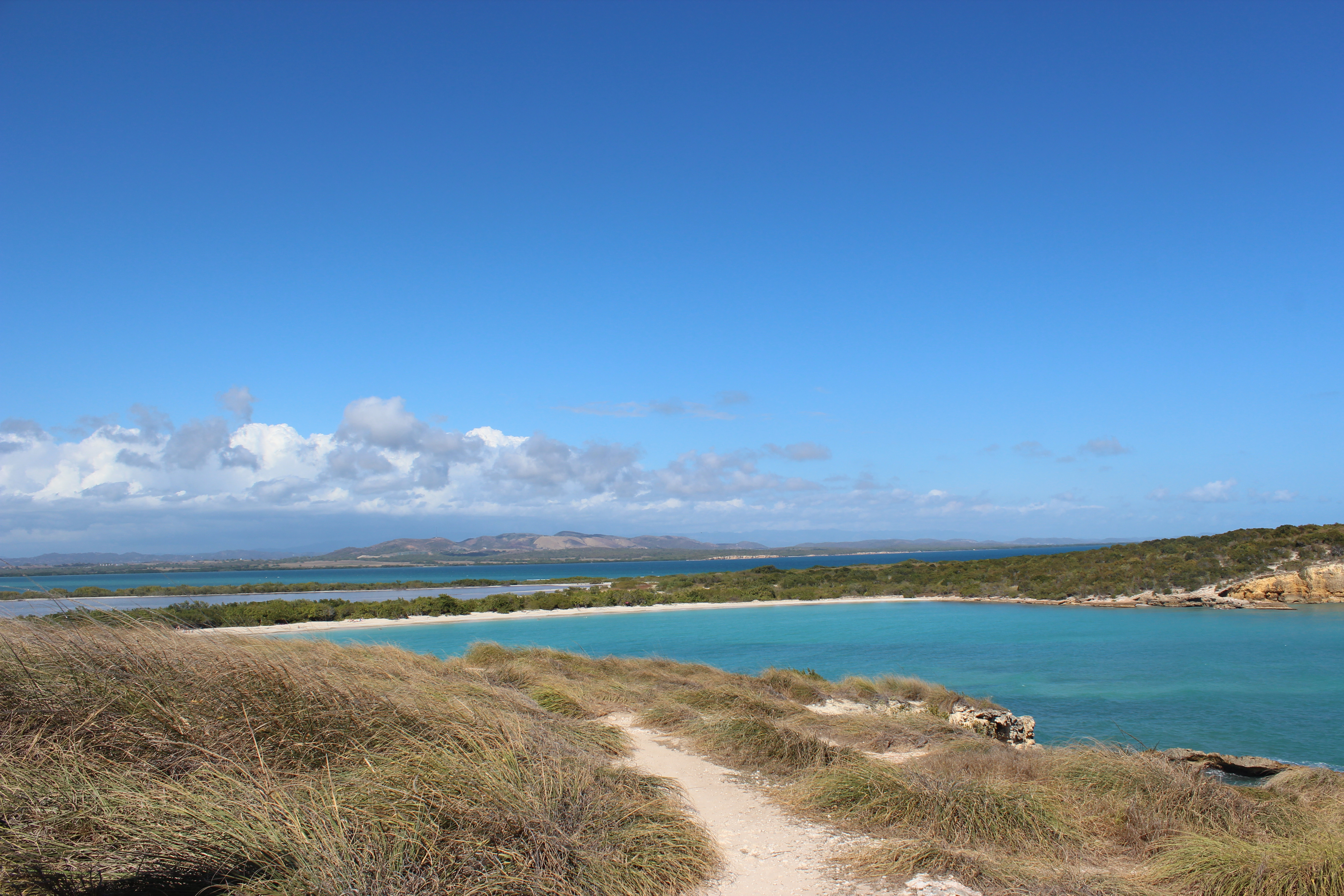
View of Cabo Rojo from Los Morrillos.

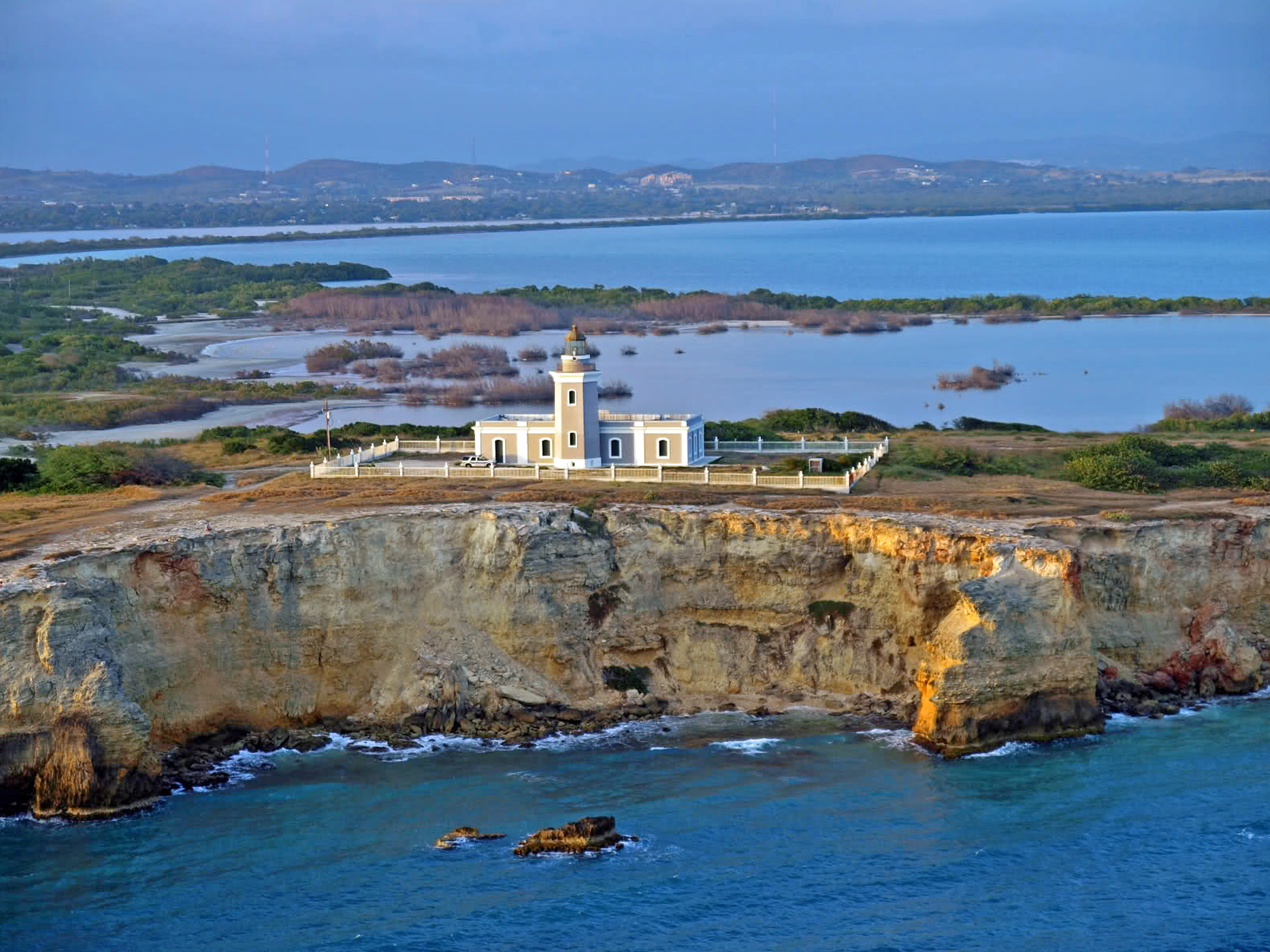
View of the lighthouse with Laguna Sucia in the background.

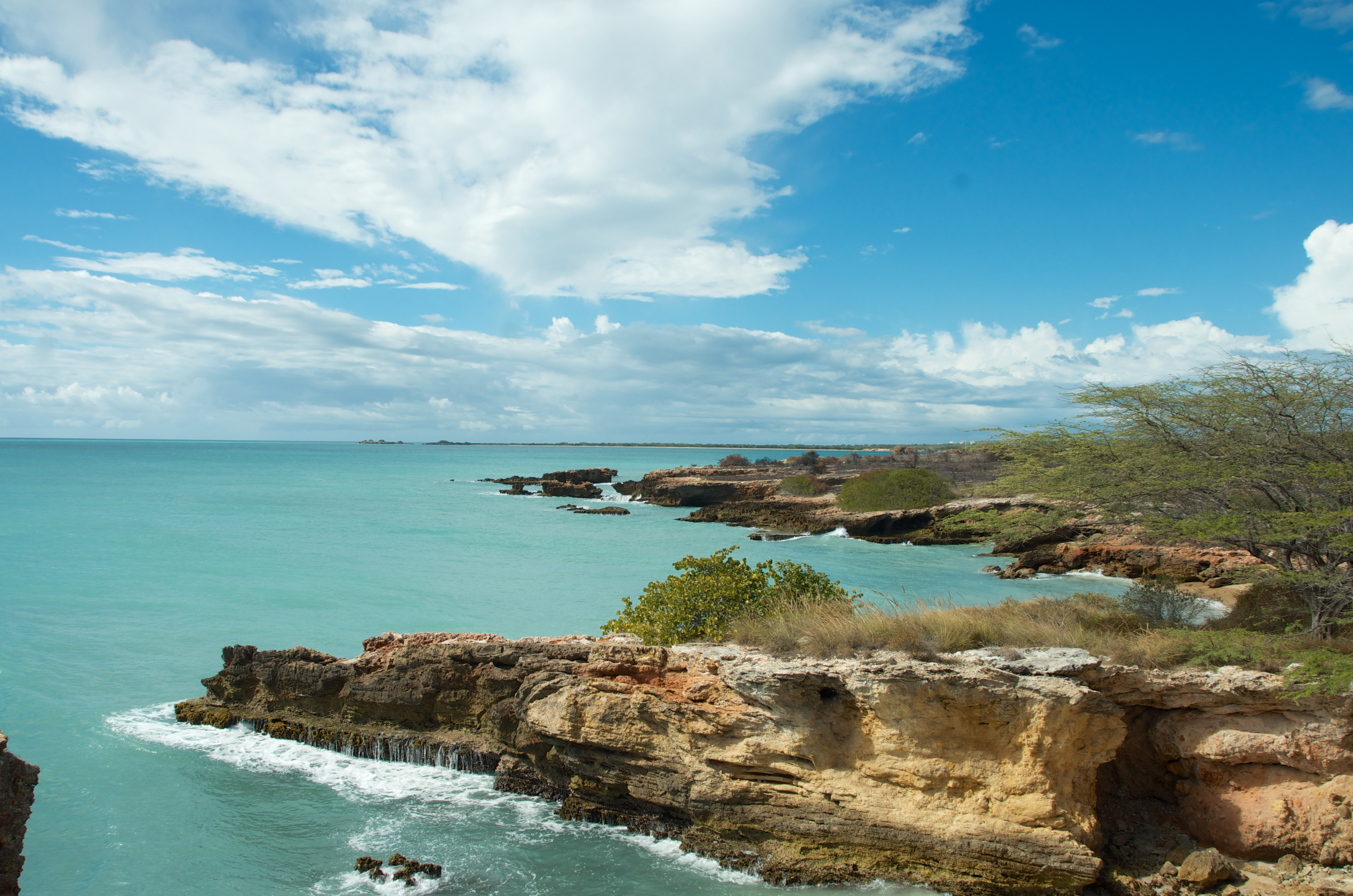
Limestone cliff formations near Playa Sucia.

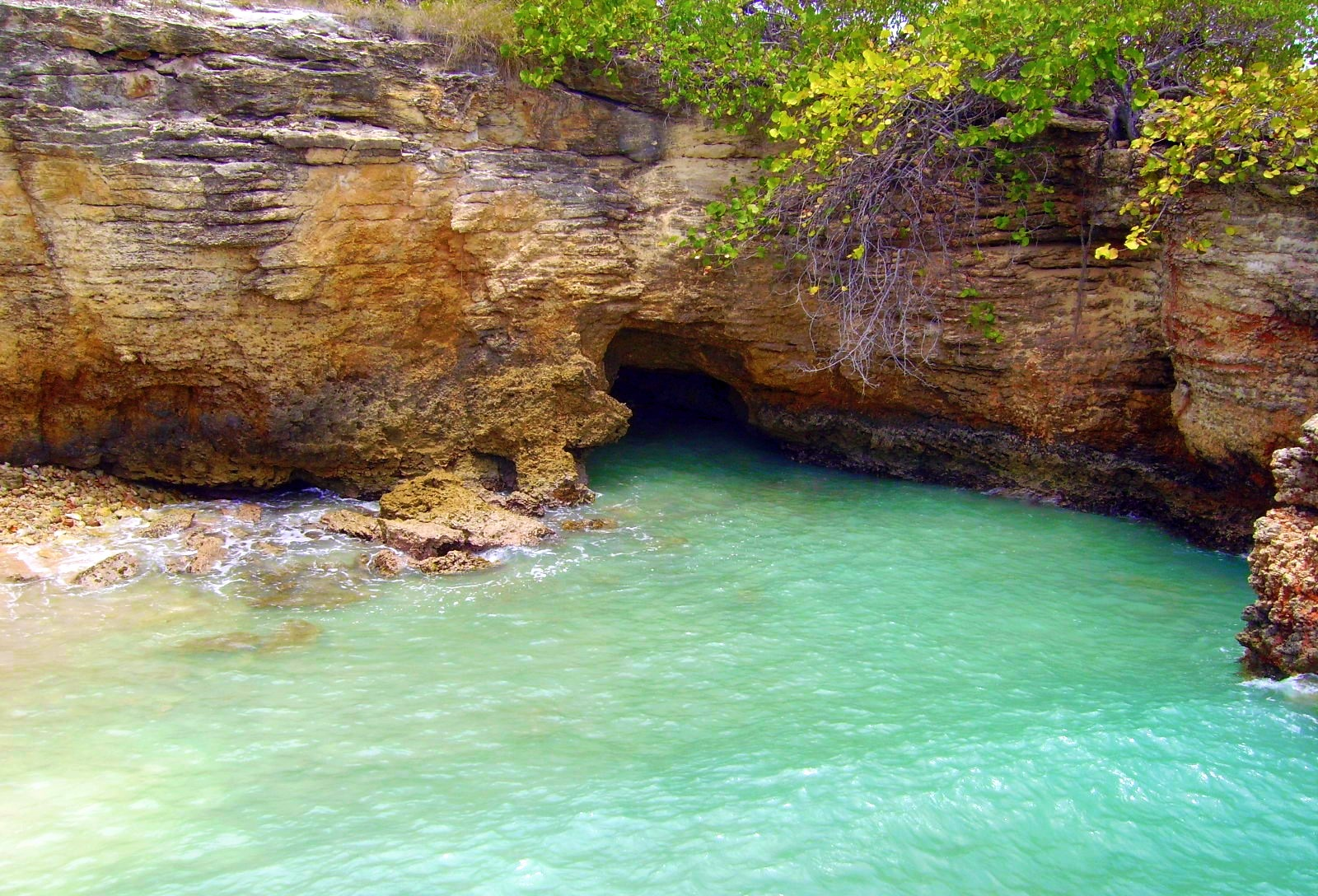
Cave near Point Jaguey.

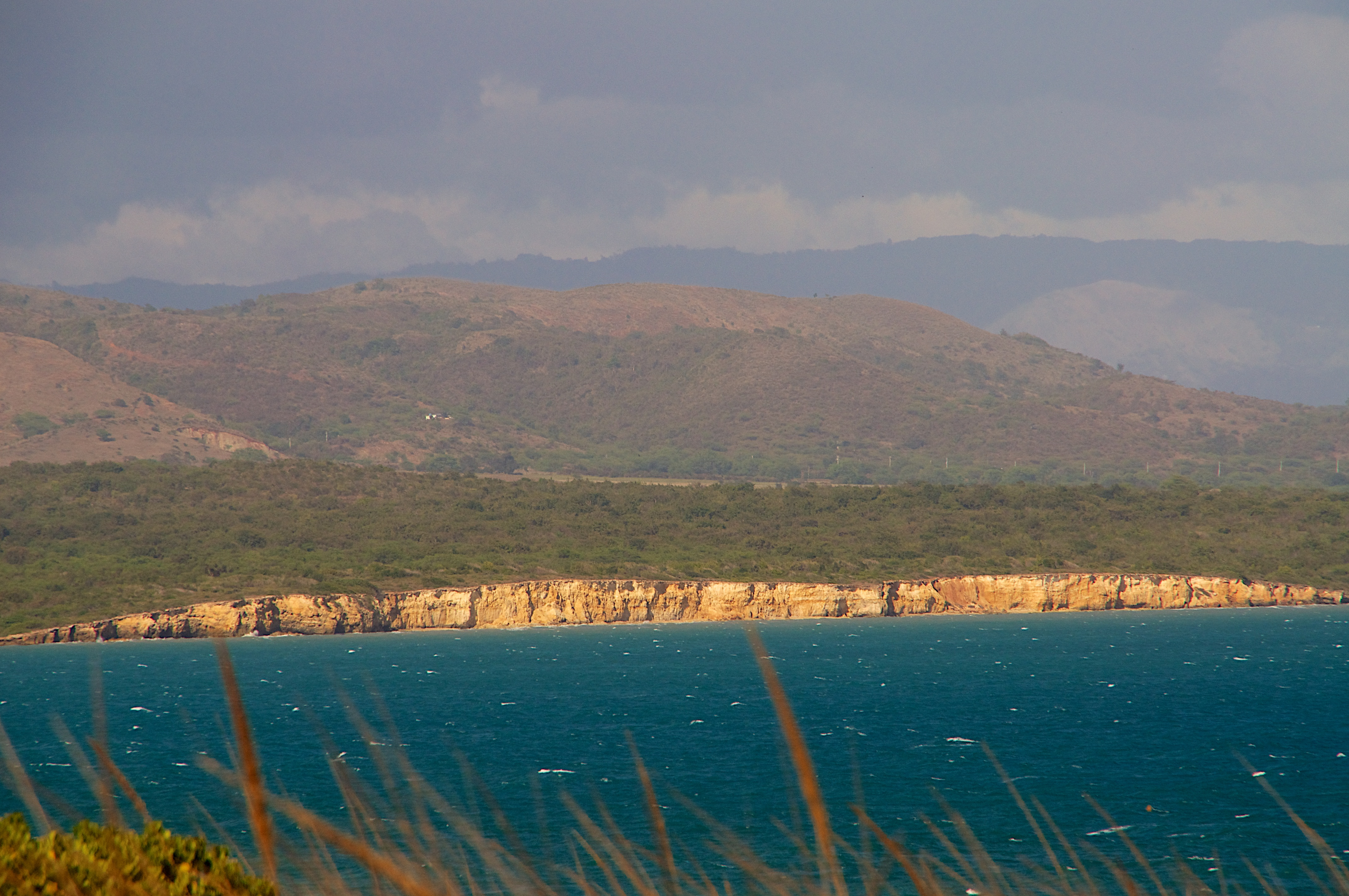
Reddish-colored limestone cliffs.

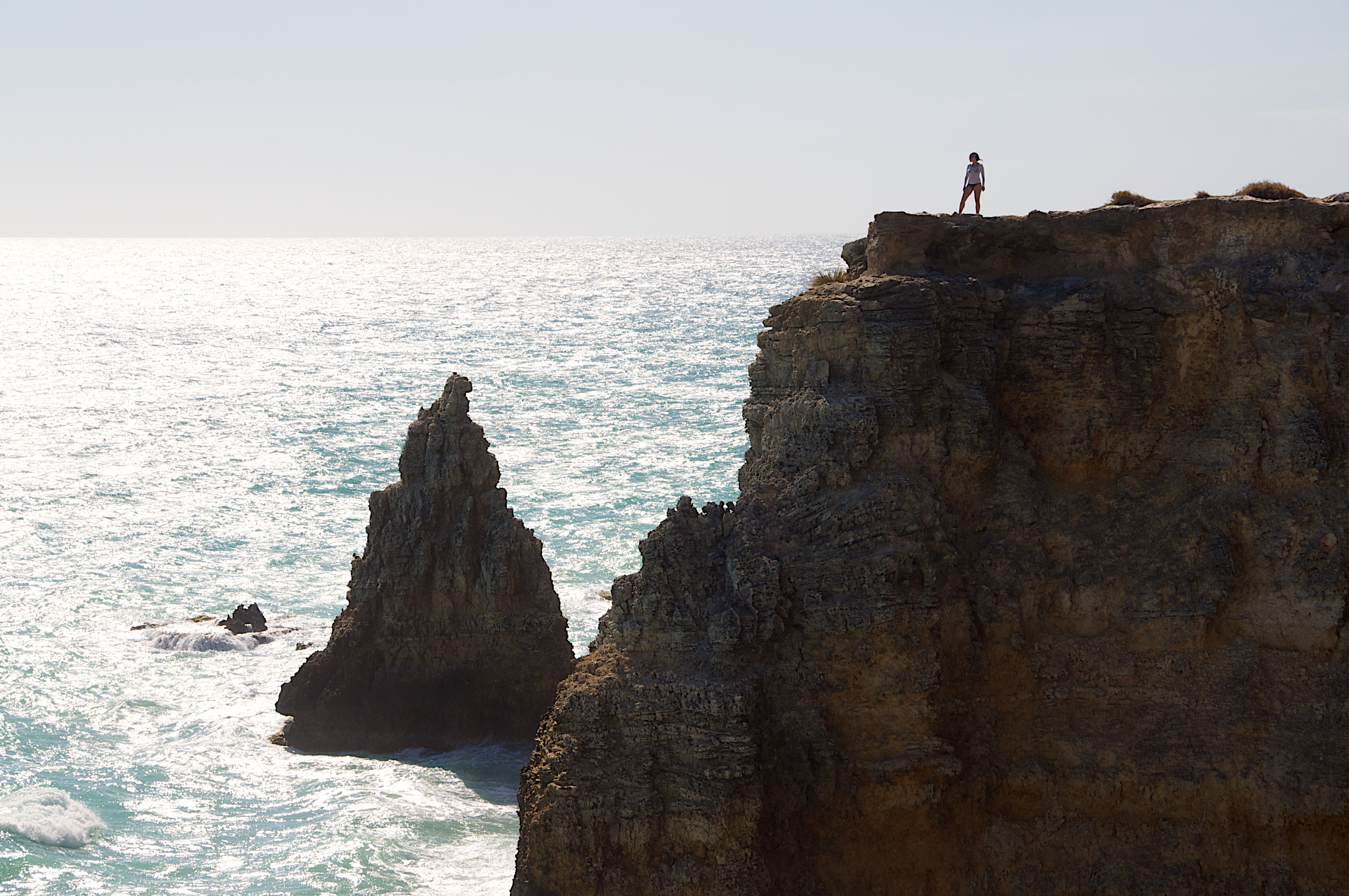
Limestone cliff formations near the lighthouse.

== See also ==
- Boquerón State Forest
- Cabo Rojo National Wildlife Refuge
- List of National Natural Landmarks in Puerto Rico
