= Boquerón Pride =

LGBTQ event in Puerto Rico

Boquerón Pride Orgullo Boquerón
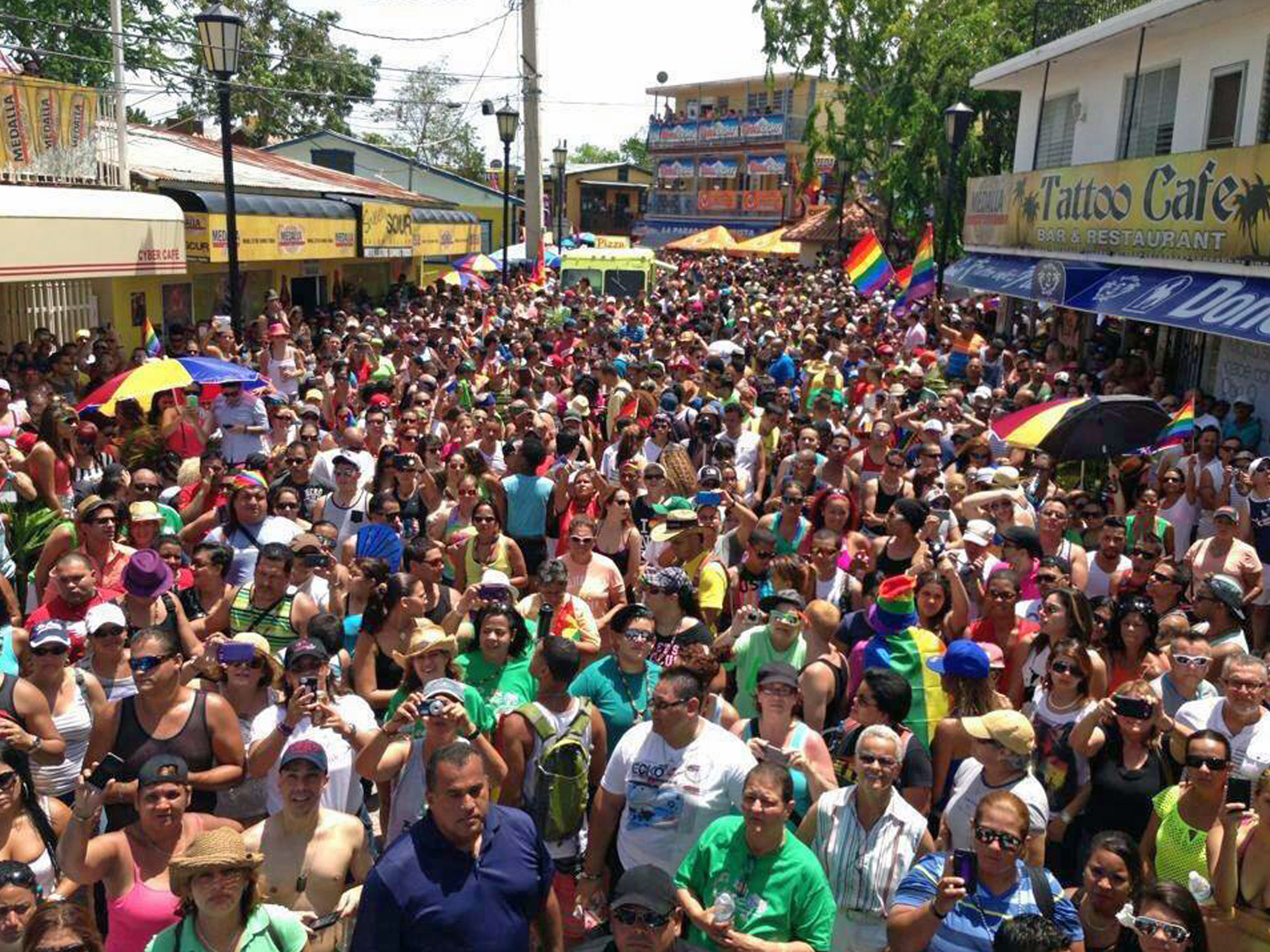
- Boquerón Pride in 2013
- Genre: pride parade and festival
- Begins: Second Friday of June
- Ends: Second Sunday of June
- Frequency: Annually
- Location: Main Street of El Poblado de Boquerón in Boquerón, Cabo Rojo, Puerto Rico
- Years active: 23

Boquerón Pride (Spanish: Orgullo Boquerón) is an annual pride parade and street party held during the month of June (usually the week after Pride Puerto Rico in San Juan) in the beach town of Boquerón in Cabo Rojo, Puerto Rico. Along with Pride Puerto Rico (also known as San Juan Pride), this is the largest LGBT pride-related event in Puerto Rico. The festival features a pride parade, street food, live music and drag queen performances, and with up to 40,000 attendees, it is one of the largest pride celebrations in the Caribbean region.

Orgullo Boquerón is celebrated in and around the main street of El Poblado de Boquerón, a small fishing village that attracts visitors from all over Puerto Rico due to its seafood, nightlife, beaches, boating opportunities and its proximity to a number of nature reserves. Although there are no exclusively gay clubs or bars in El Poblado, this small village is considered the second most popular gay destination in Puerto Rico for its drag queen events and gay-friendly bars, restaurants and hotels.

== History ==
Boquerón Pride was founded by Rosalina "Talin" Ramos Padró in 2003. The pride event has been celebrated yearly ever since during Pride Month, usually the weekend after the celebration of Pride Puerto Rico, also known as San Juan Pride, and it draws attendees from all over Puerto Rico. In 2016, after the tragic events at Pulse nightclub in Orlando where many of the victims were Puerto Rican members of the LGBT community, a march and memorial rather than a parade and street party were held instead. Puerto Rican singer and actress Yolandita Monge was the godmother of the event that year. The event was cancelled in 2020 due to the COVID-19 pandemic and was celebrated once again in 2021 during the month of October (during the weekend of National Coming Out Day). Puerto Rican model and Miss Universe 2001 winner Denise Quiñones was proclaimed godmother of the parade that year. According to Pedro Julio Serrano, spokesperson of the event, Boquerón Pride will once again be celebrated in the month of June in 2022.

== See also ==
- LGBT in Puerto Rico
