= El Poblado de Boquerón =

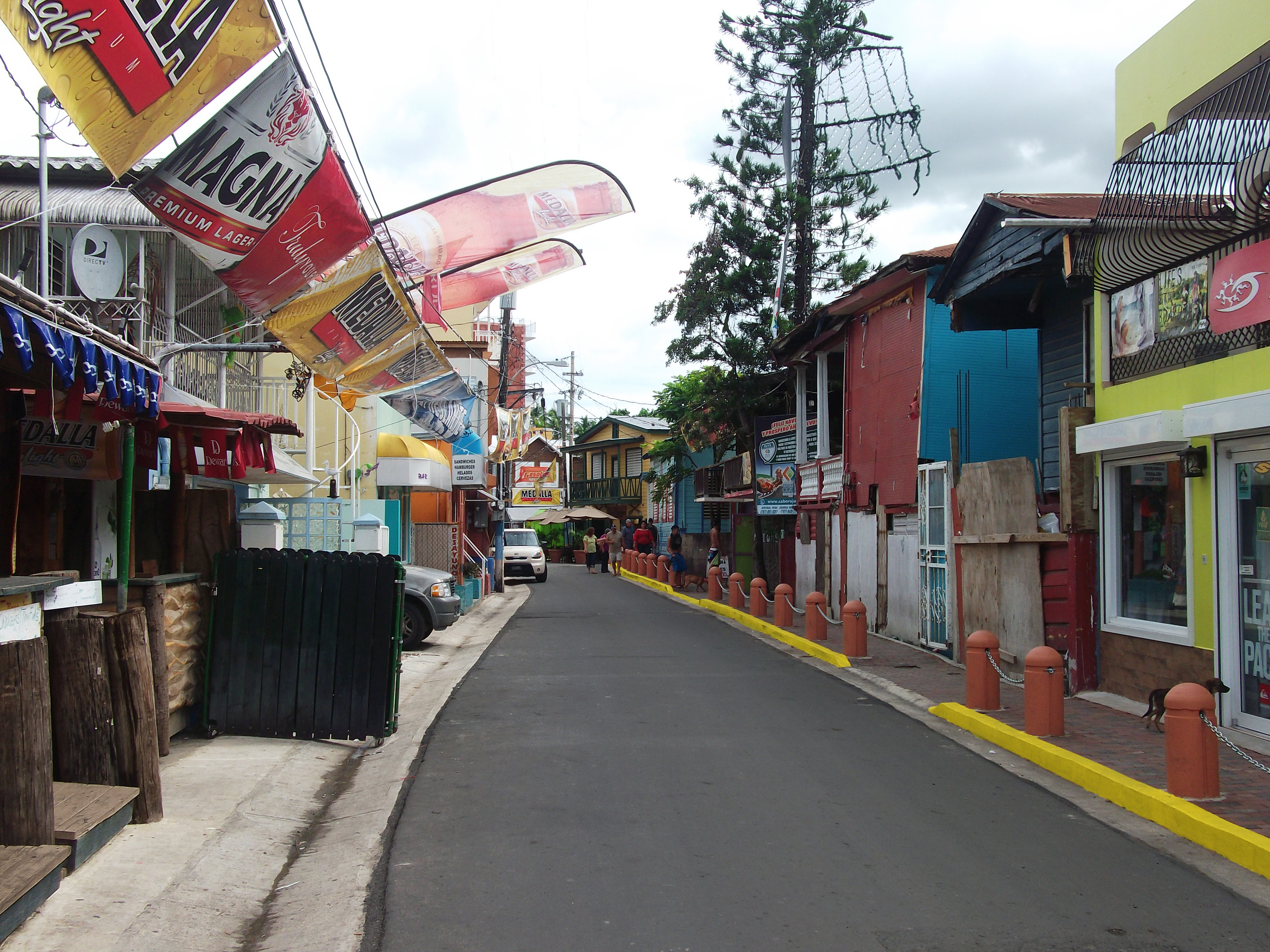
Poblado de Boquerón in 2012.

El Poblado de Boquerón (Spanish for the settlement of Boquerón) is a coastal village which represents the downtown or main urban nucleus of the barrio (district) Boquerón of Cabo Rojo, located on the northeast of Boquerón Bay. The village is a major tourist destination, and it is renown in Puerto Rico for its gastronomy, boathouses, beach, nightlife and its yearly pride parade.

The area around the village of Boquerón was first populated by indigenous Taíno peoples and several native archaeological sites have been uncovered in its vicinity. The modern village originated as a fishing village (villa pesquera) and much of its fishing industry can still be seen today. One of the main fishing products of the area are oysters, which gives the region its nickname La Zona Ostionera ("the oyster zone").

The village today features a large number of hotels, inns and B&Bs, seafood restaurants, bars (including dive bars and karaoke bars), a waterfront promenade (malecón), a functioning fishing and recreational marina, and a main street that becomes pedestrianized during weekend nightlife and pride celebrations. Boquerón Beach, one of the most popular beaches in Puerto Rico, is located immediately south of El Poblado de Boquerón. El Poblado is also known for being LGBT friendly and hosts Boquerón Pride, a popular and growing pride parade that is held each year in June. The village is also close to the Cabo Rojo National Wildlife Refuge and the Boquerón State Forest, which provide opportunities for birdwatching, hiking, biking, snorkeling and kayaking.

== Gallery ==
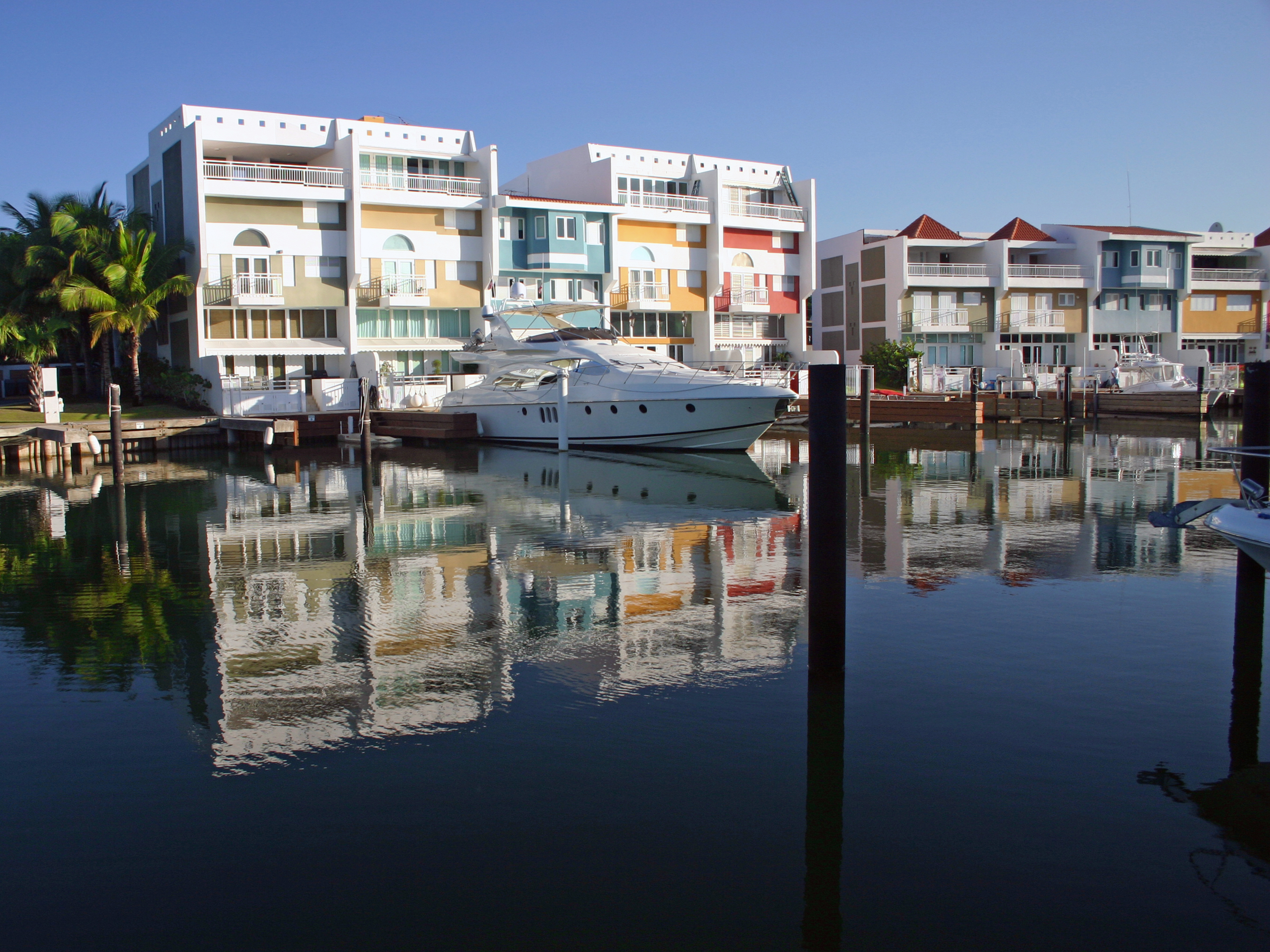
Vacation condos by the Boquerón Marina.

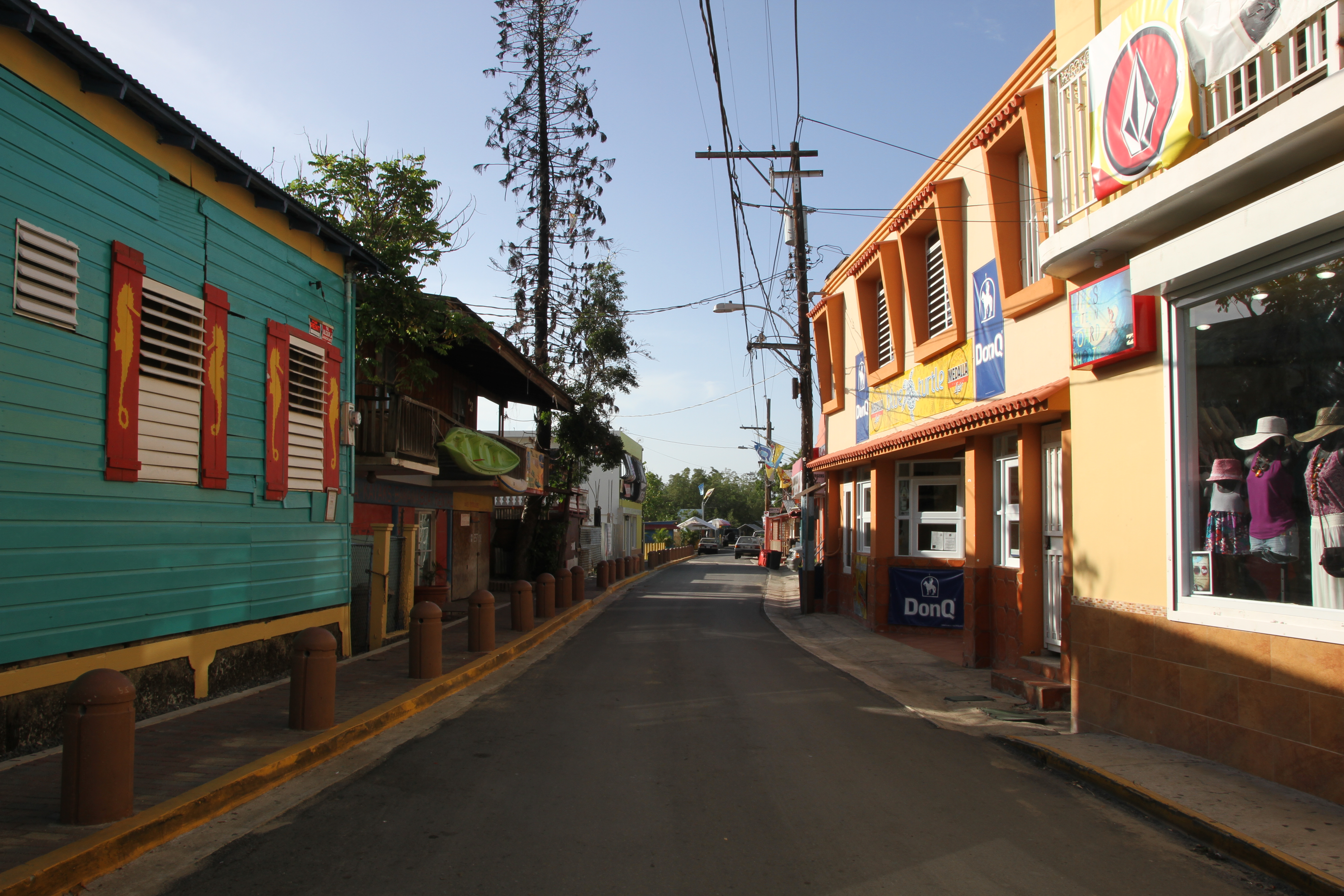
Empty street in El Poblado during low season.

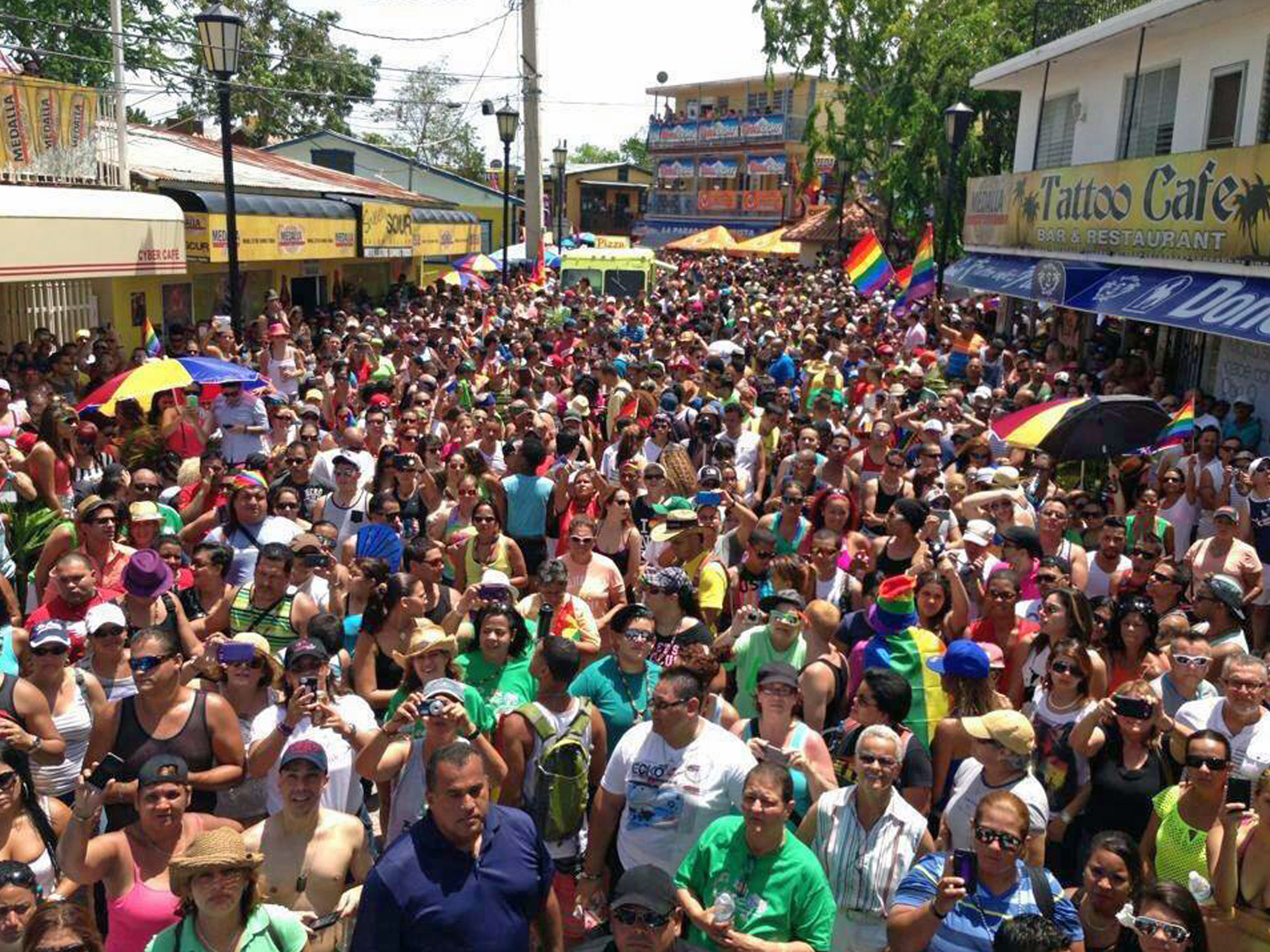
Boquerón Pride in 2013.

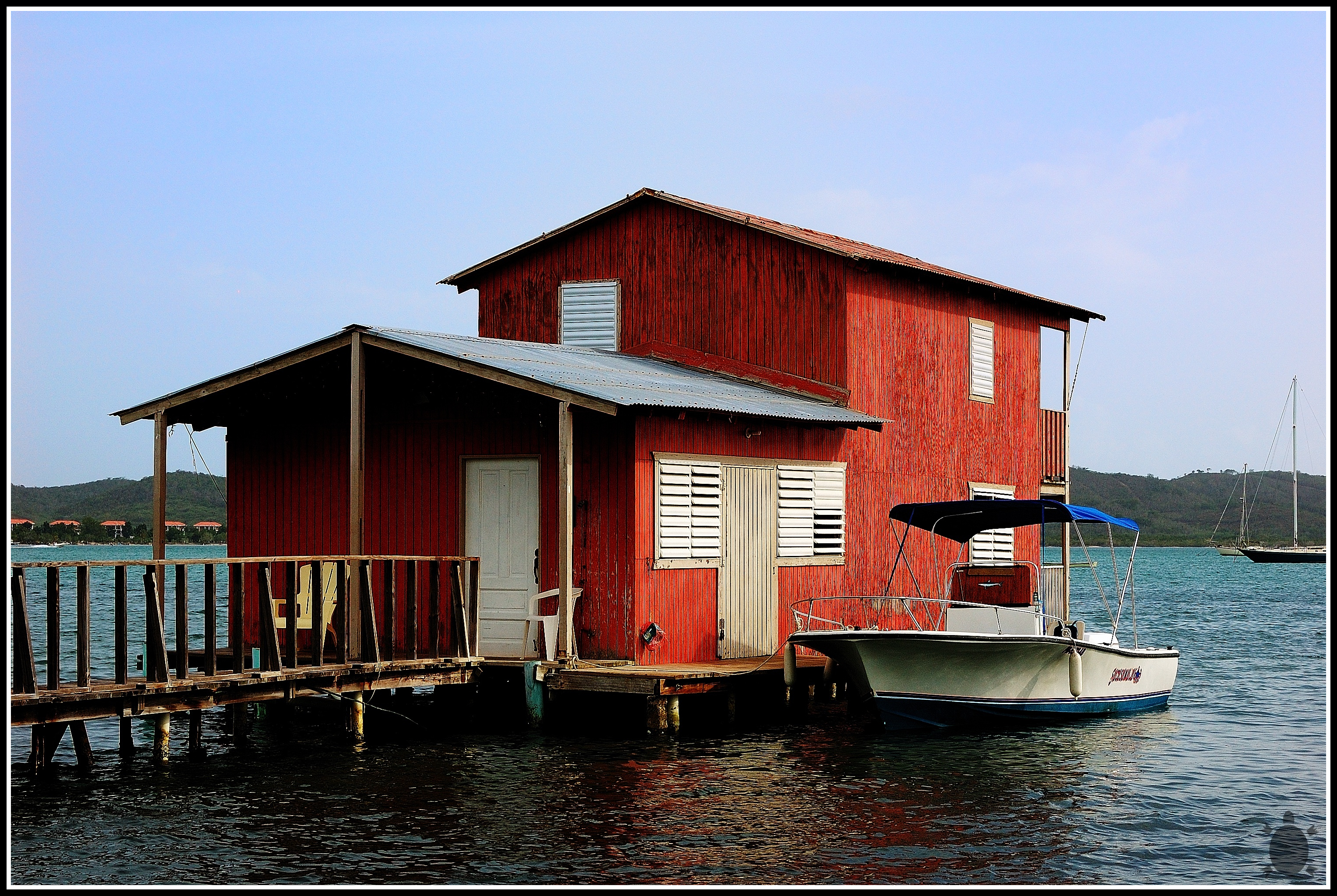
Boathouse in Boquerón.

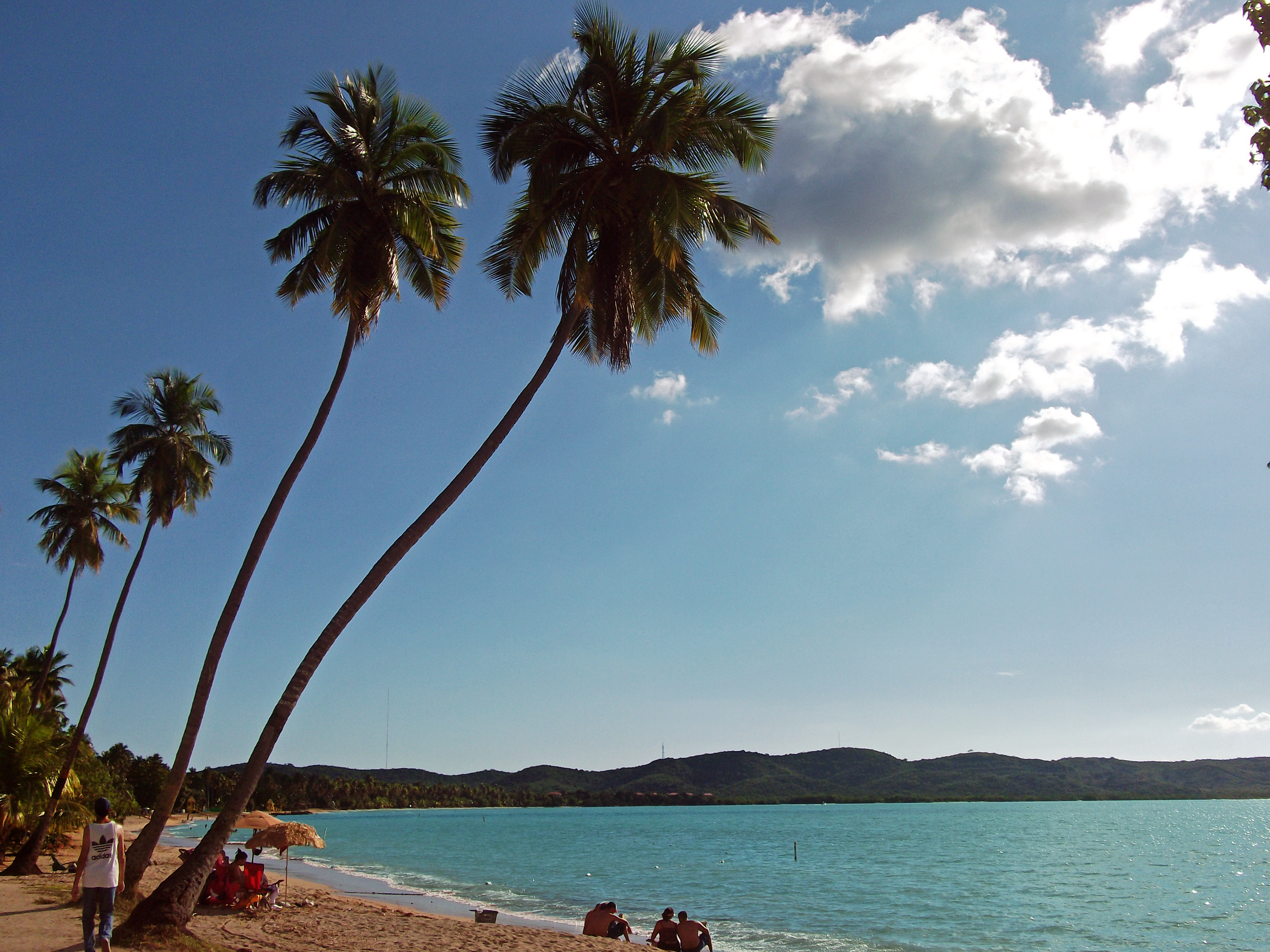
Boquerón Beach

== See also ==
- El Combate, another popular fishing village in Cabo Rojo
- Poblado de la Parguera, a fishing village in Lajas
- List of communities in Puerto Rico
