= Boquerón State Forest =

State forest in Puerto Rico

Boquerón State Forest Spanish: Bosque Estatal de Boquerón
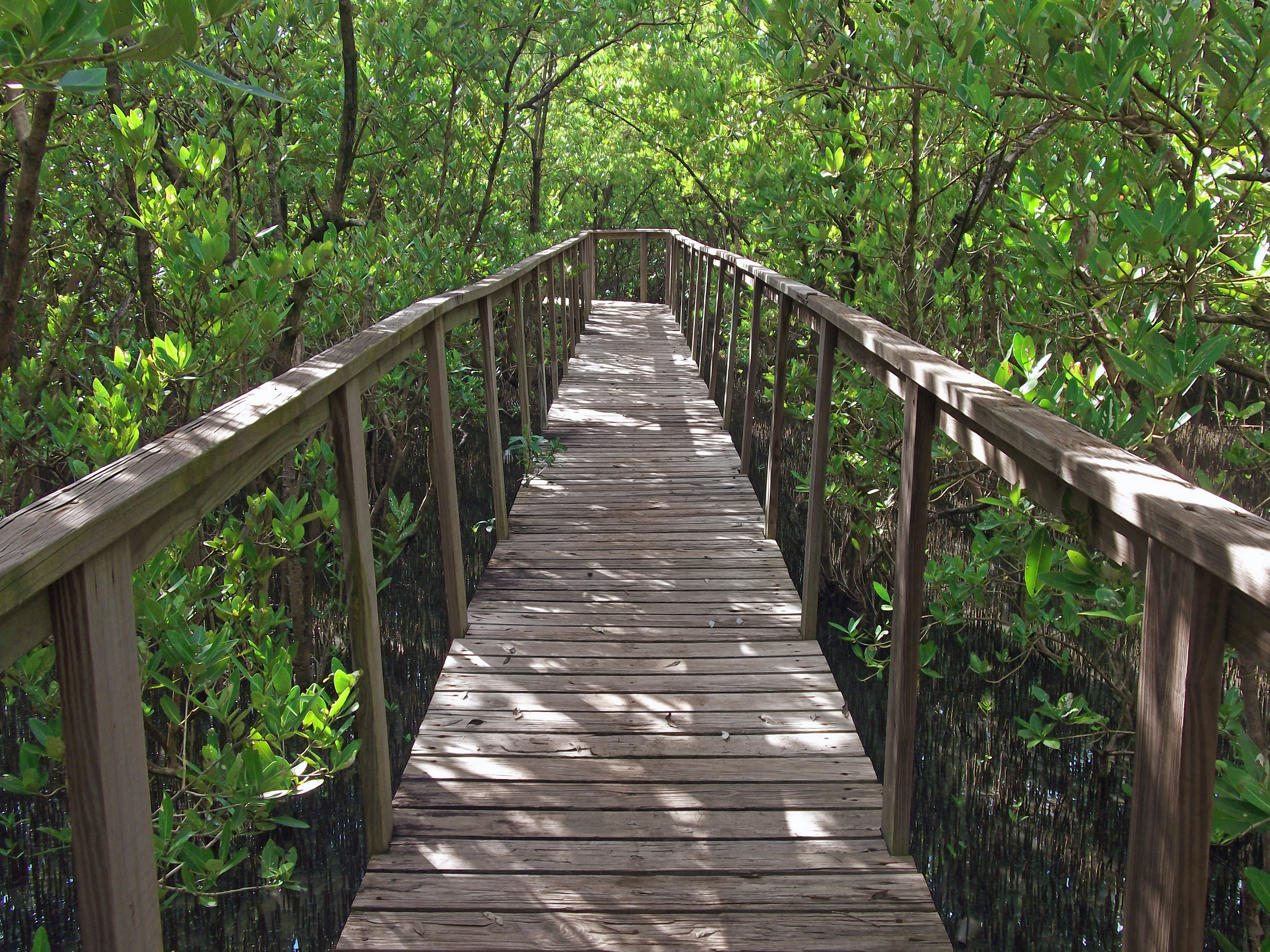
- Boardwalk across a mangrove in the forest.

Map
- Interactive map of Boquerón State Forest

Geography
- Location: Cabo Rojo, Lajas, Mayagüez
- Coordinates: 17°57′35″N 67°05′39″W

Administration
- Governing body: Puerto Rico Department of Natural and Environmental Resources (DRNA), United States Fish and Wildlife Service (FWS)
- Website: www.drna.pr.gov

Ecology
- WWF Classification: Greater Antilles mangroves

Boquerón State Forest (Spanish: Bosque Estatal de Boquerón) is one of the 20 forestry units that make up the public forest system of Puerto Rico. Despite its name, the Boquerón State Forest is not only located in Boquerón, Cabo Rojo but also spans almost 5,000 acres across the municipalities of Cabo Rojo, Lajas and Mayagüez. The forest area is also known for its limestone cliffs, the lighthouse, and the salt flats which have been a source of salt since the pre-Hispanic era and, dating to 700 C.E., they are considered to be one of the oldest industries in the Americas.

== History ==
Boquerón State Forest is one of the oldest forests in the Puerto Rico state forest system. It was proclaimed and designated a forest preserve in 1918 by Puerto Rico governor Arthur Yager with the purpose of preserving the mangrove biomes in Cabo Rojo and Lajas. Two additional segments, the Guayacán and Cuevas Keys, were added in 1943. The areas of the Molino mangroves, Los Morrillos (famous for its lighthouse) and the Guaniquilla Lagoon and surrounding mangroves were annexed to the Boquerón State Forest in 1980.

The state forest today is managed by the Puerto Rico Department of Natural and Environmental Resources and extends across 9 management segments across three municipalities:

1. Mangrove forest of Guanajibo, Mayagüez.
2. Joyuda Lagoon and mangroves in Joyuda, Cabo Rojo.
3. Puerto Real mangrove forest in Miradero, Cabo Rojo.
4. Boquerón mangrove forests in Cabo Rojo.
5. Cabo Rojo National Wildlife Refuge in Llanos Costa, Cabo Rojo.
6. Las Salinas de Cabo Rojo (the salt flats) and adjacent mangrove forests in Llanos Costa, Cabo Rojo.
7. Molino mangrove forest in Llanos Costa, Cabo Rojo.
8. Pitahaya mangrove forest in Llanos Costa, Cabo Rojo.
9. Bahía Montalva mangrove forest, part of La Parguera Nature Reserve, in Costa, Lajas.

The 607-acre area designated since 1980 as the Cabo Rojo National Natural Landmark is also located within the state forest borders.

== Geology ==
The forest is located in the Puerto Rico southern karst region and as such all of its geological formations contain limestone, particularly the Ponce limestone. It is often said that the reddish-colored limestone is what gives its name to the municipality and city of Cabo Rojo (Spanish for "red cape").

== Ecology ==
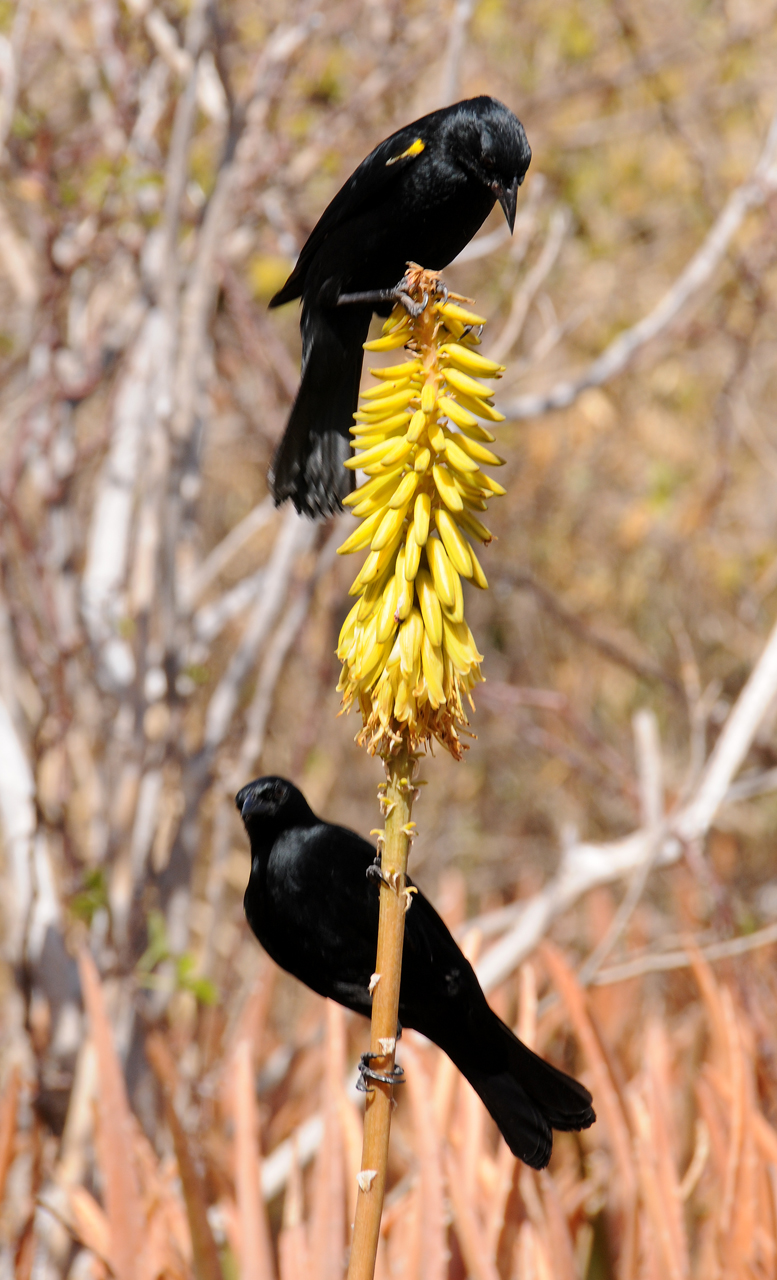
This forest has the largest population of the rare and endangered yellow-shouldered blackbird, locally known as mariquita.

The Boquerón Forest is ecologically important and it hosts several marine biomes in addition to the mangrove forests such as coral reefs and seagrass meadows which are important to threatened species such as the West Indian manatee.

All four species of mangrove are found within the forest, in addition to important indicator plant species such as the bullet tree (Terminalia buceras), the greenheart (Colubrina arborenscens) and the sea grape (Coccoloba uvifera). The endangered black cóbana (Libidibia monosperma) and the critically endangered bariaco (Trichilia triacantha) are also found and preserved in the forest.

The beaches around the forest are important sea turtle nesting sites, particularly for the leatherback sea turtle (Dermochelys coriacea), the hawksbill sea turtle (Eretmochelys imbricada) and the green sea turtle (Chelonia mydas). Additionally, the forest serves as one of the few habitats in the world where the endangered yellow-shouldered blackbird (Yellow-shouldered blackbird) can be found. Found along the southeastern edge of the Atlantic Flyway, the forests further serves as one of the most critical migratory bird habitats in Puerto Rico. Due to these reasons, the southern portion of the Boquerón Forest is a contributing section of the Southwestern Puerto Rico Important Bird Area, while the western coast mangrove forests found along the Boquerón Bay are a contributing section of the Guaniquilla and Boquerón Important Bird Area, both recognized globally by BirdLife International in 2007.

== Recreation ==
The forest's main offices are located in Poblado de Boquerón, Cabo Rojo. Tours are available for large groups but must be reserved in anticipation by contacting the forest office at (787)-851-7260. The reserve offers opportunities for hiking, fishing, kayaking, biking, snorkeling and birdwatching. The area also contains numerous landmarks and tourist attractions such as the Los Morrillos Lighthouse, the salt flats, and the limestone cliffs and rock formations such as the Stone Bridge (Spanish: Puente de Piedra), and numerous beaches.

== Gallery ==
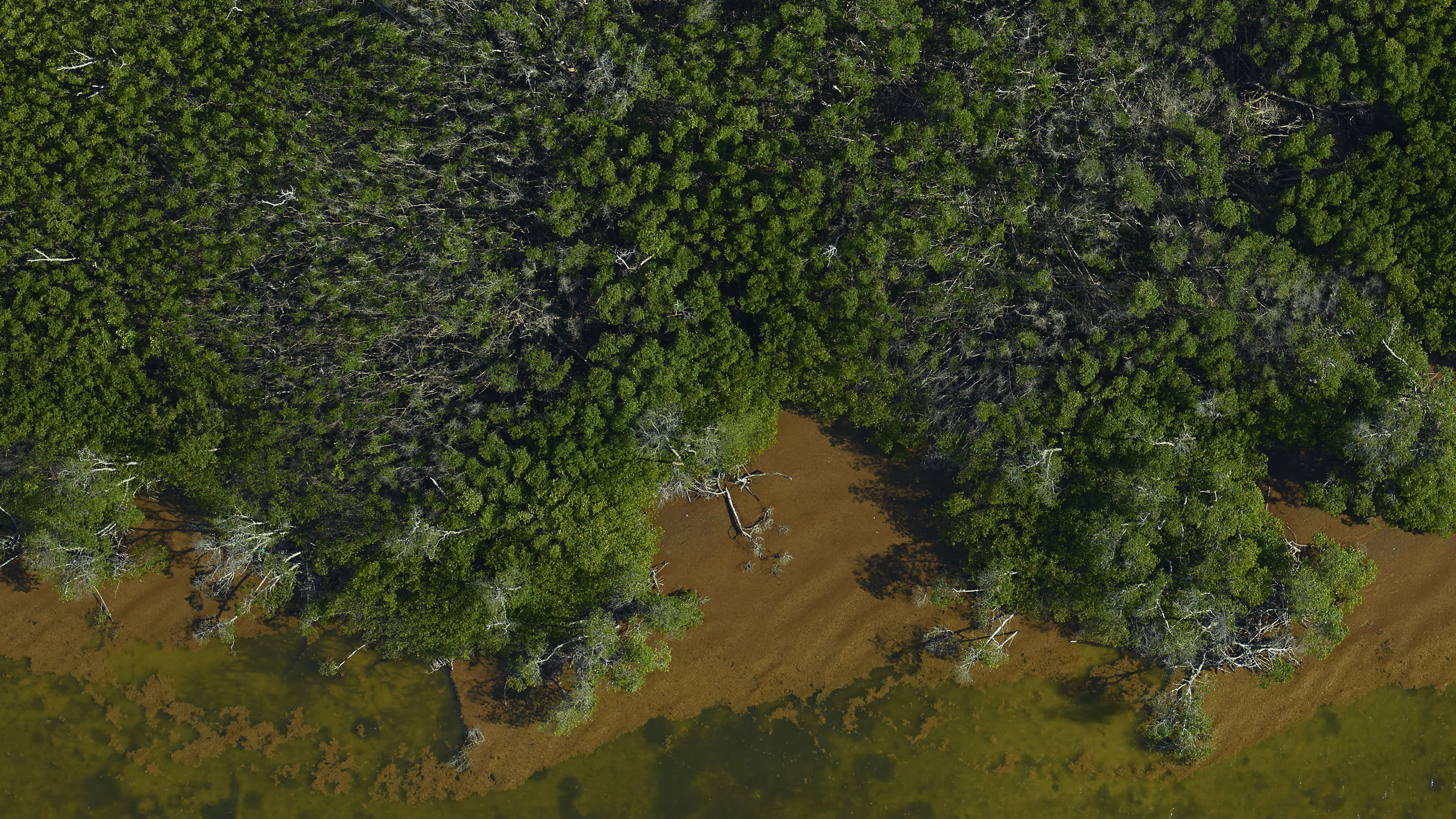
Aerial view of the Boquerón mangroves forest, 2018.

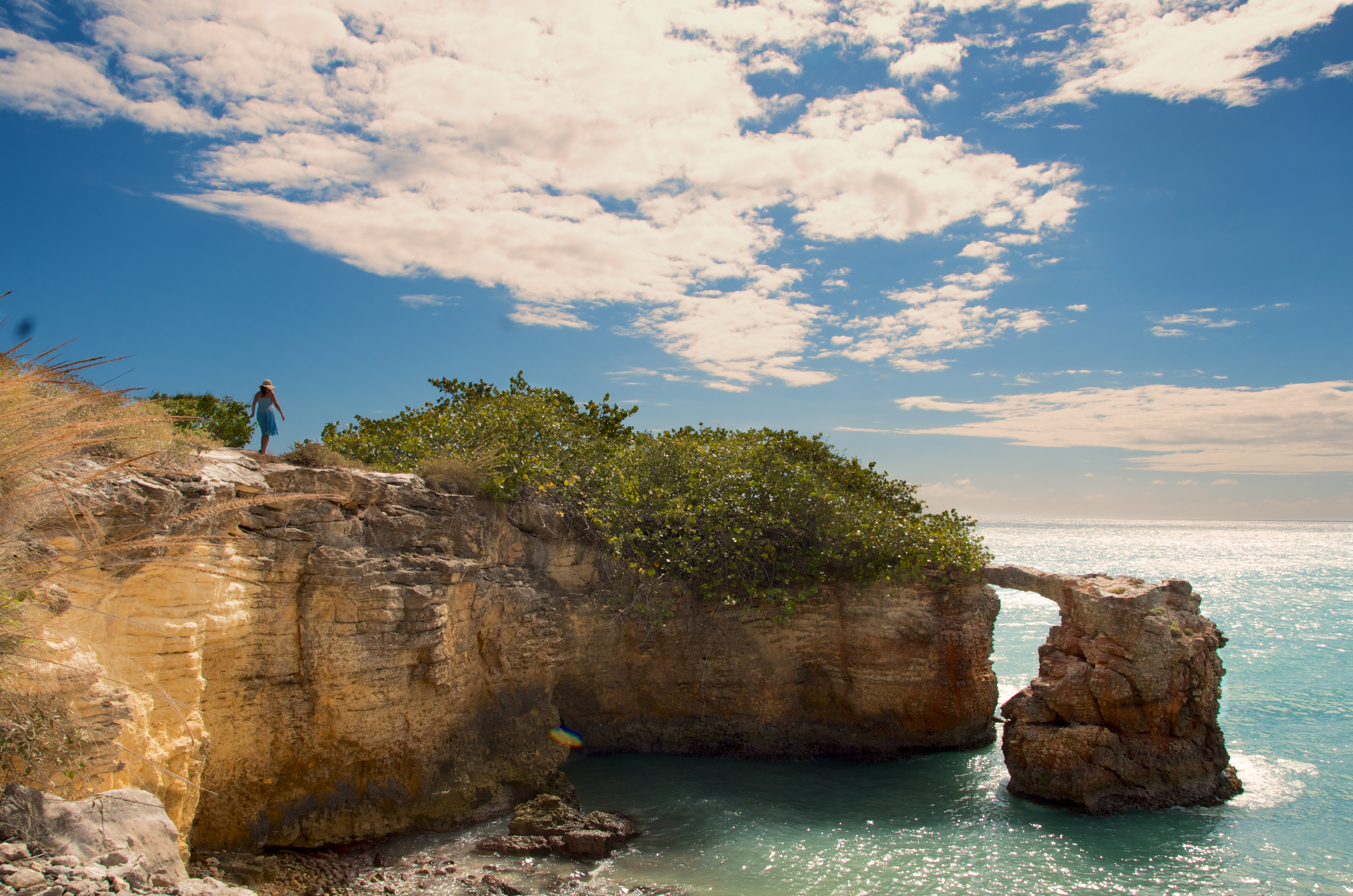
Puente de Piedra ("stone bridge") in Los Morrillos, Cabo Rojo.

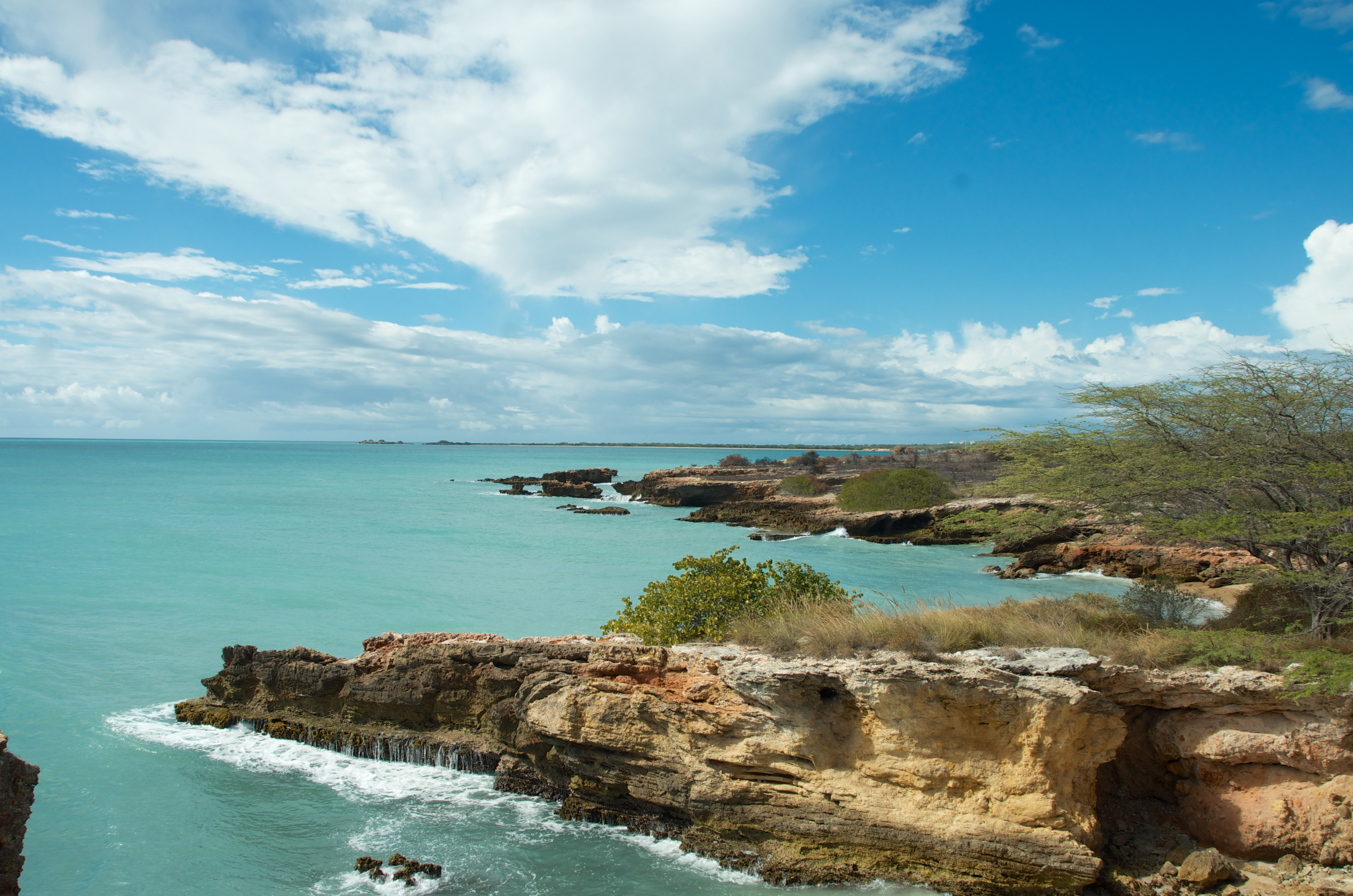
Limestone cliffs in Los Morrillos, Cabo Rojo.

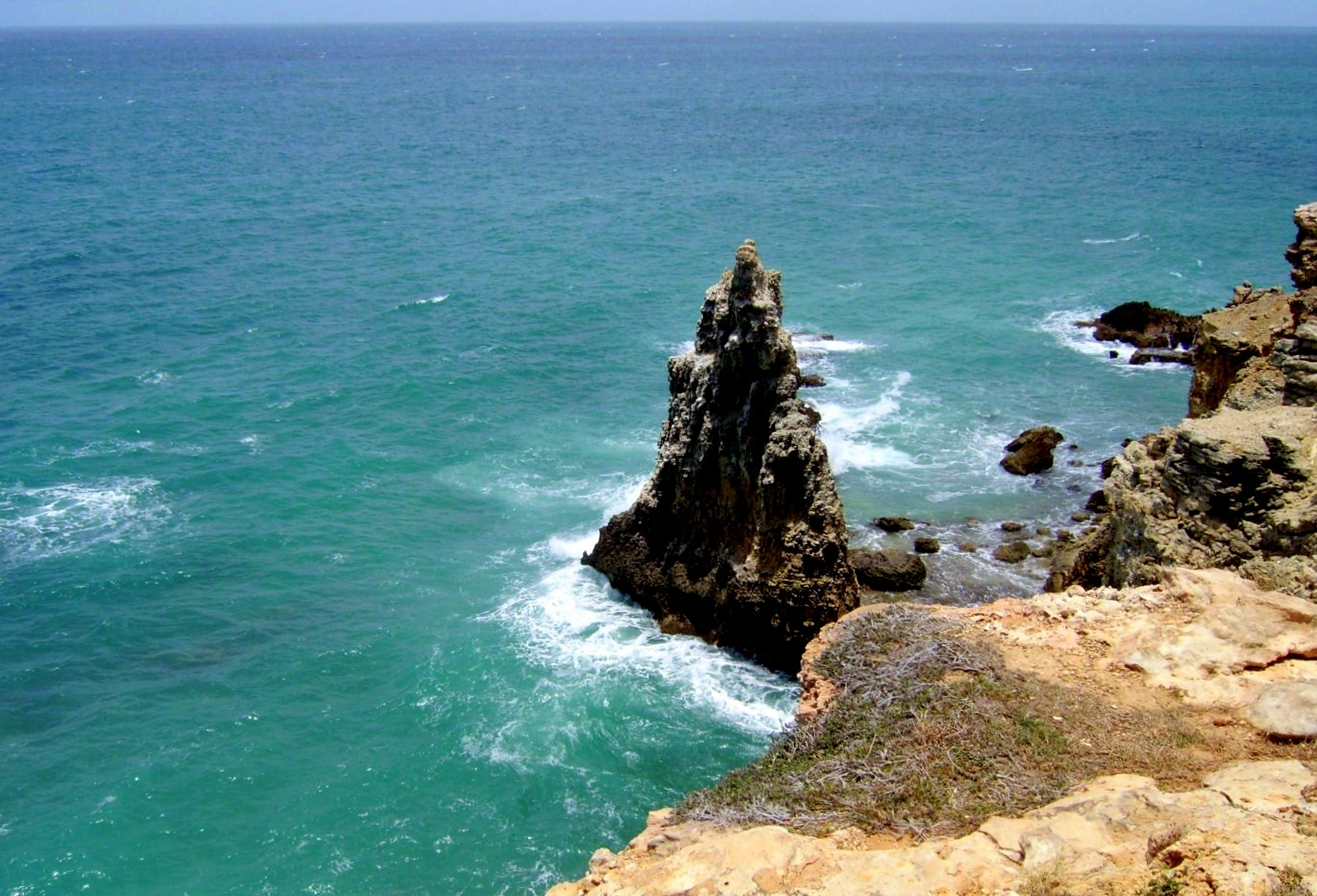
Limestone cliffs and rock formations in Los Morrillos, Cabo Rojo.

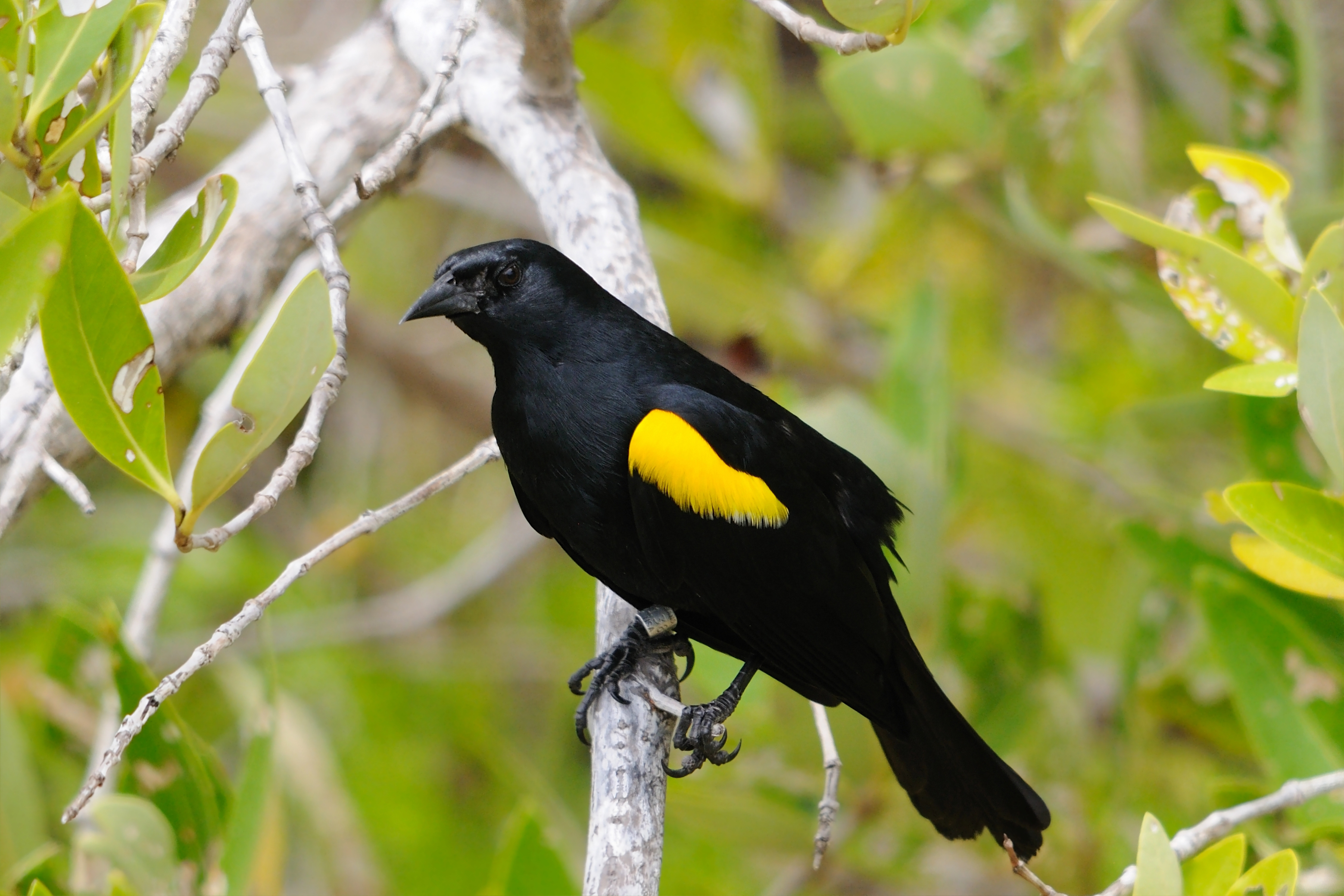
The yellow-shouldered blackbird, locally known as mariquita.

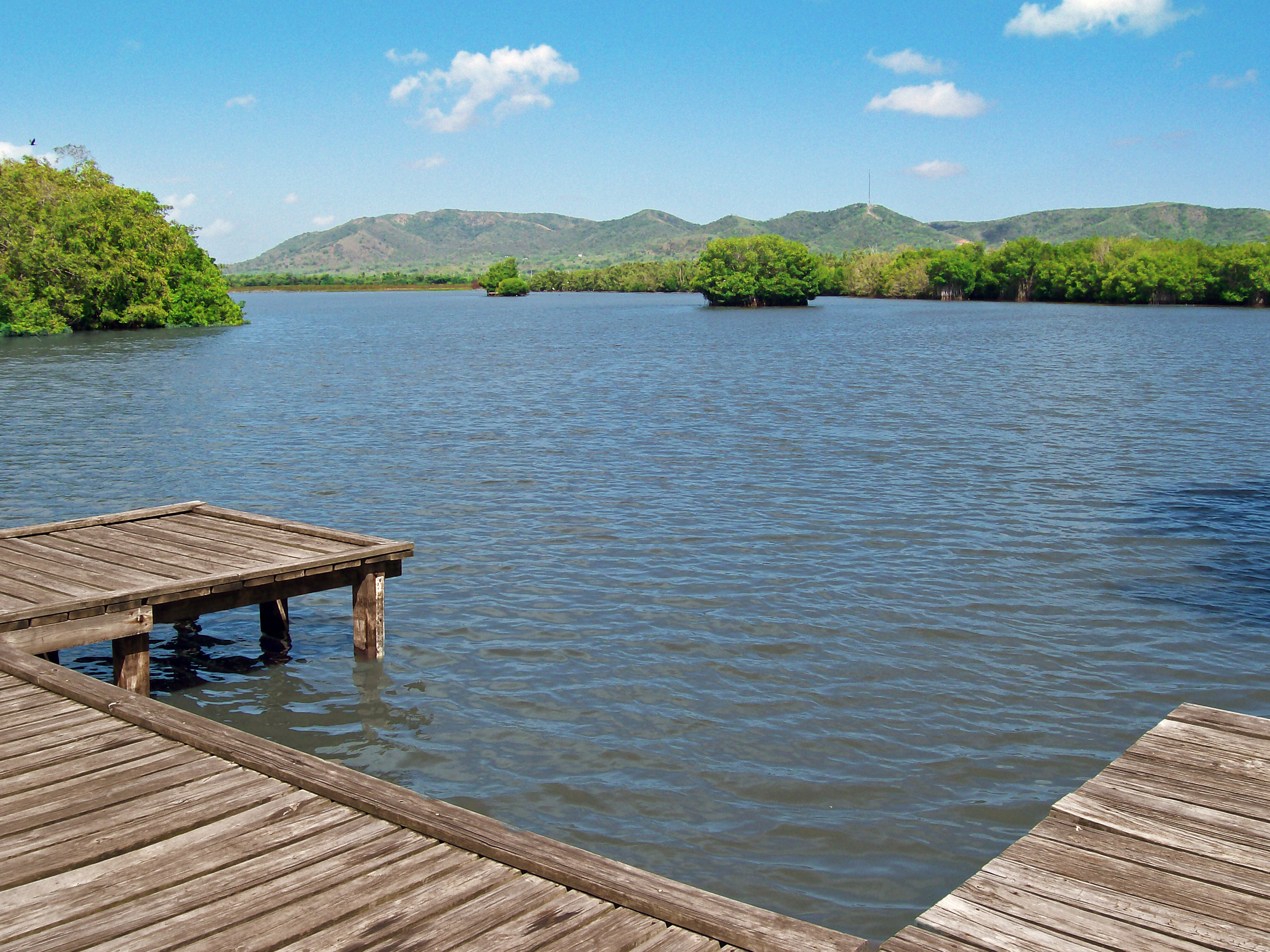
Lagoon with mangrove in Boquerón, Cabo Rojo.

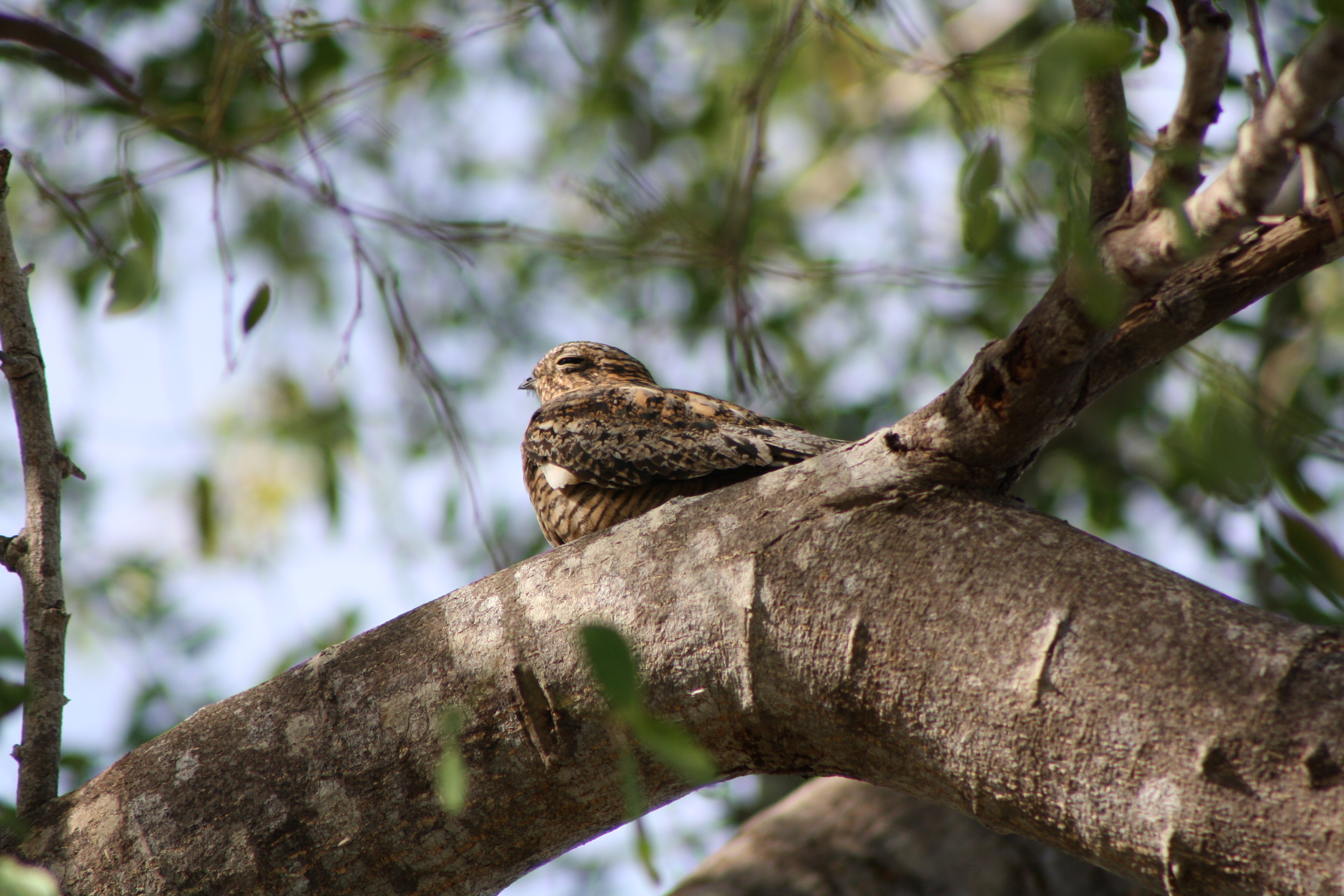
Endangered Puerto Rican nightjar in the National Wildlife Refuge area.

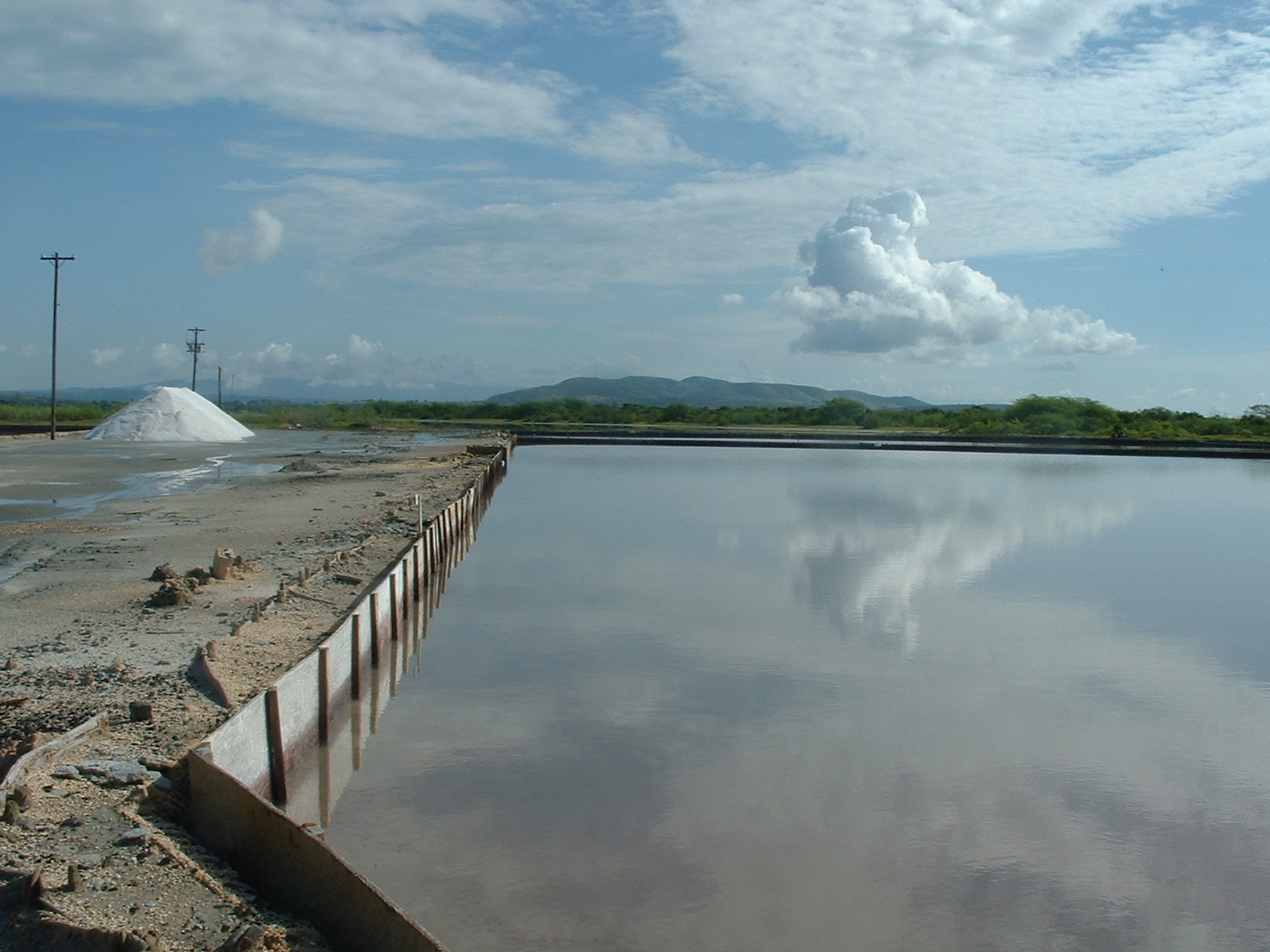
Cabo Rojo salt flats.

== See also ==
- Boquerón, Cabo Rojo
- Cabo Rojo National Wildlife Refuge
- List of Puerto Rico state forests
