= Pride Puerto Rico =

Annual LGBT event in Puerto Rico

Puerto Rico LGBT Pride
- Native name: Parada de Orgullo LGBT de Puerto Rico
- Date: June
- Location: San Juan, Puerto Rico
- Type: Pride festival
- Motive: LGBT Pride
- Organised by: Coalición de Orgullo Arcoíris (Rainbow Pride Coalition)

The Puerto Rico LGBT Pride or Pride Puerto Rico is a pride march held annually in the city of San Juan, Puerto Rico, to celebrate LGBT Pride, increase the visibility of LGBT people, and demand respect for their rights. During the event, which takes place in June, participants wear colorful clothing and carry pride flags around the city in a festive atmosphere to the sound of LGBT-themed music and accompanied by floats and comparsas.

The first edition of the event took place in 1991 on the initiative of LGBT activist Christina Hayworth, who managed to obtain permission to hold the event. Beginning the following year, the march was organized by the Coalición de Orgullo Arcoíris (Rainbow Pride Coalition), which has continued to organize the event today. Over the years, the event has grown in attendance, and by the mid-2010s, it attracted between seven thousand and ten thousand participants.

The Pride Puerto Rico is considered as one of the largest and most important pride marches in the Caribbean region. Unlike many similar marches in the United States, the Puerto Rican march receives support from relatively few corporate sponsors, and its participants are mostly members of LGBT organizations and individual attendees Since 2003, the march has followed the same route, beginning at Parque del Indio (Indian Park), proceeding along Ashford Avenue, and ending at Parque del Tercer Milenio (Third Millennium Park), where a closing artistic event known as the "Puerto Rico Pride Fest" is also held.

== History ==
In 1990, different LGBT groups from Puerto Rico began to discuss the possibility of a pride march or some other similar event as a way to improve the visibility of the LGBT population on the island. Among the possibilities considered at the time was the holding of an event in commemoration of LGBT Pride at Luis Muñoz Rivera Park, and plans were made to hold the event in July of that year.

However, the first edition of the Puerto Rico LGBT Pride took place on 23 June of the following year. The event was held thanks to the initiative of transgender activist Christina Hayworth and the group to which she belonged, Herencia de Orgullo Gay Puertorriqueño (Puerto Rican Gay Pride Heritage), who managed to obtain permission for holding the event. Due to the complexity of organizing such an event, Hayworth sought the support of the Puerto Rican subsidiary of ACT UP, which contacted other local LGBT organizations to secure their support. Hayworth led the march, which began at Luis Muñoz Rivera Park, and ended at the intersection of Magdalena Street and Ashford Avenue.

For the following year's march, which had the slogan "Gay Pride Begins With You", several LGBT people and groups came together to form the Coalición de Orgullo Arcoíris (Rainbow Pride Coalition), that has organized the event since then. The march of that year began at Dos Hermanos bridge and ended at Plaza Antonia Quiñones. In 1993, Plaza Hotel & Casino County requested that the government revoke permission for the march to proceed through Ashford Avenue, but the request was eventually rejected by the courts, and the march was allowed to use the avenue. That year's march began at Parque del Indio (Indian Park), proceeded along Ashford Avenue and reached its final destination at the Peace Pavilion in Luis Muñoz Rivera Park. Since then, the route has remain unchanged annually, with the only change being the end point, which was moved to Parque del Tercer Milenio (Third Millennium Park) in 2003, to accommodate the growing number of participants

Over the years, the Pride march has served as an event celebrating the various achievements of Puerto Rican LGBT people, and the laws enacted for the betterment of their rights including the adoption of the Hate Crimes Act in 2002, the repeal of article 103 of the Criminal Code that criminalized same-sex relations in 2003, and the enactment of the law prohibiting discrimination in employment on grounds of sexual orientation and gender identity in 2012.

In 2014, the march attracted seven thousand participants, while it exceeded eight thousand in the following year. The edition of that year received support from the government authorities for the first time, and involved the participation of several politicians including Senator Ramón Luis Nieves, legislator Pedro Peters, and former gubernatorial candidate Rafael Bernabé. Alejandro García Padilla, the governor of Puerto Rico, recorded a message of support for the attendees of the march, which was also attended by artists such as Ednita Nazario, Yolandita Monge, and Pedro Capó.

The 2016 event, which took place on June 26, attracted about ten thousand attendees, a higher number than in previous editions. During this edition, participants paid tribute to the victims of the Pulse nightclub shooting in Orlando, Florida, which left 49 people dead, including 23 Puerto Ricans, through messages and banners. At the end of the march, the mayor of San Juan, Carmen Yulín Cruz, inaugurated a monument in honor of the victims. The march was also attended by religious delegations representing 15 churches.

The 2020 event, which was supposed to be the 30th edition of the event, was postponed to 2021 due to the COVID-19 pandemic.
