= Luis Carle =

Puerto Rican photographer (born 1962)

- Born: 1962 (age 63–64); San Juan, Puerto Rico
- Occupation: Photographer
- Known for: "Respect Trans," a depiction of Sylvia Rivera, Julia Murray, and Christina Hayworth.

Luis Carle (born 1962) is a Puerto Rican photographer.

== Early life ==
Carle was born in San Juan, Puerto Rico in 1962 and moved to New York City in 1984 to study photography at the Parsons School of Design.

== Career ==
In the early 1980s, Carle explored the intersection of crafts, such as silkscreening, and photography. He began his career working as an assistant to well-known artists and photographers. He also participated in activist activities such as the 1987 March on Washington for Lesbian and Gay Rights.

In the 1990s, Carle began working for magazines such as Latina, CRN magazine, and Footwear News. He also worked for the newspapers El Diario La Prensa, San Juan Daily Star, and El Nuevo Día. His advertising campaigns included Cutty Sark, AT&T, and OBRI Cosmetics. In 1992, Carle founded O.P. Art, Inc. (Organization of Puerto Rican Artists, Inc.), a not-for-profit artist-run collective. He would serve as its leader through 2013.

In the realm of museums, Carle's work has appeared in the Getty Museum, Caribbean Museum in St. Croix, Museo of Contemporary Arts in San Juan, Museo de las Américas, Centro Gallery at the Center for Puerto Rican Studies at Hunter College, El Museo del Barrio, MOCADA: Museum of Contemporary African Diasporan Arts, the Museum of Modern Art, and the Hague Arts Center.

In 2014, the National Portrait Gallery at the Smithsonian purchased Carle's work "Respect Trans," a depiction of Sylvia Rivera, Julia Murray, and Christina Hayworth.

== Personal life ==
In 1995, Carle was diagnosed with lung cancer.
