= Boquerón Bay =

Is a bay of the Mona Passage located on the coast of Cabo Rojo, Puerto Rico

- Bahía de Boquerón
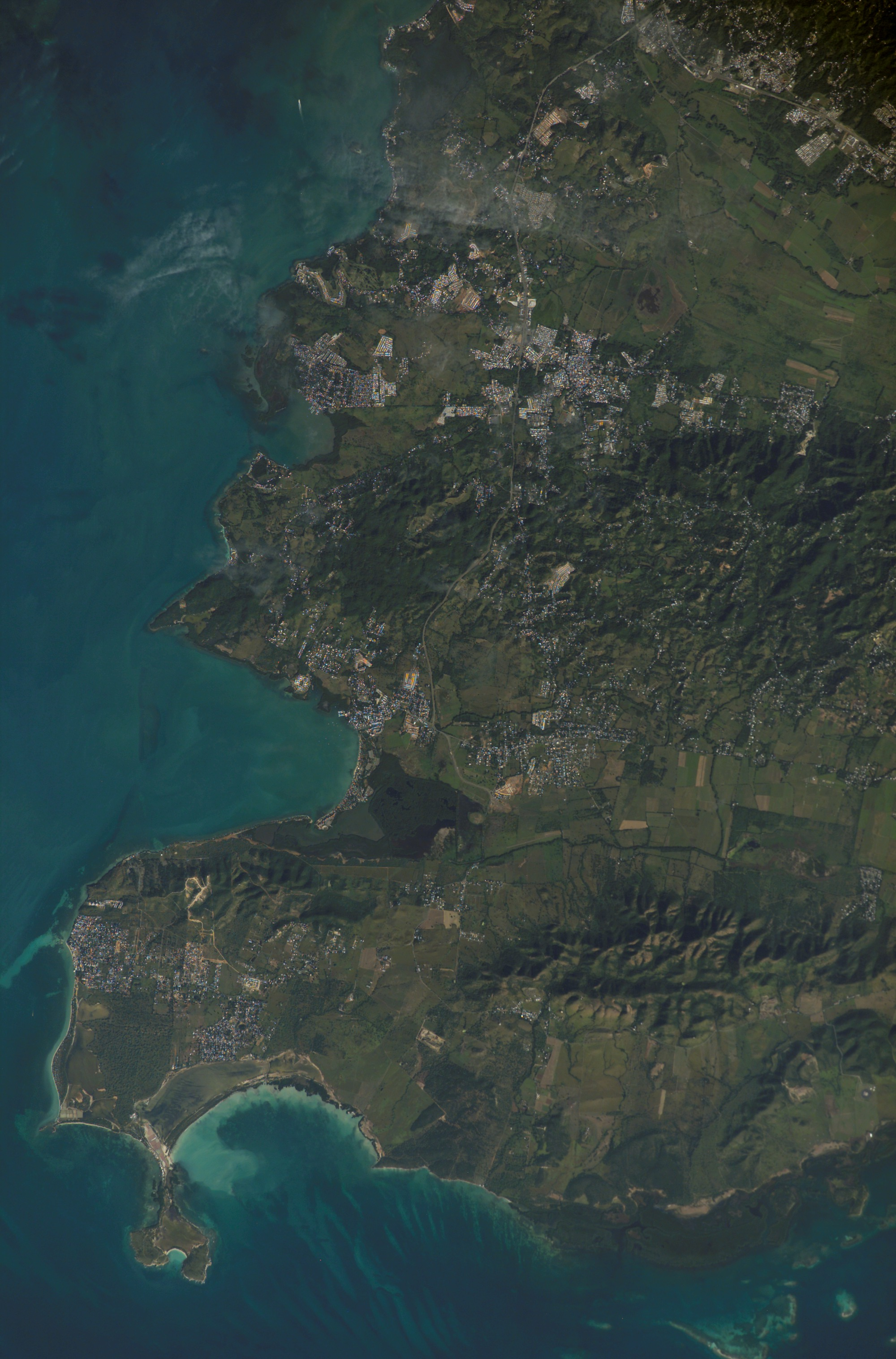
- Boquerón Bay as seen from the ISS

- Location within Puerto Rico
- Location: Cabo Rojo, Puerto Rico
- Coordinates: 18.0176177°N 67.195618°W
- Settlements: Boquerón

Boquerón Bay (Spanish: Bahía de Boquerón) is a bay of the Mona Passage located on the coast of Cabo Rojo, Puerto Rico. El Poblado de Boquerón, or just Boquerón for short, located in the barrio of the same name, is the main settlement located along the bay. The bay is a major tourist destination as it hosts the Boquerón Beach (Balneario de Boquerón) and Los Pozos Beach. The Boquerón Lagoon (part of the Cabo Rojo National Wildlife Refuge) and the Boquerón Iris Alameda Wildlife Refuge (part of the Boquerón State Forest) are located immediately to the east of the bay next to Boquerón Beach.

== See also ==
- Tourism in Puerto Rico
