= Christina Hayworth =

American journalist and trans rights activist (died 2021)

Christina Hayworth (1940s- February 8, 2021) was an American AIDS and transgender rights activist and journalist. Born in Humacao, Puerto Rico, Hayworth focused most of her work in New York and Puerto Rico. She was a colonel in the US Army, where she was a part of the US occupation of Vietnam. Hayworth was present at the Stonewall riots of 1969 and became a Stonewall Veterans Association (SVA) ambassador to Latin America.

== Activism and legacy ==
Known as one of the first openly trans women in Puerto Rico, Hayworth was the founder of Herencia de Orgullo (Heritage of Pride). She led the first pride parade in Puerto Rico on June 13, 1991, which ran from Luis Muñoz Rivera Park to Puerta de Tierra in Condado.

Alongside her friend Sylvia Rivera, she appeared in the first portrait of transgender Americans included in the Smithsonian's National Portrait Gallery. The portrait, taken by Puerto Rican photographer Luis Carle in 2000, was installed in the Struggle for Justice exhibition in October 2015.

== Puerto Rico ==
After moving to Puerto Rico for some time, Hayworth continued her work as an activist and journalist. She was the president of the Heritage of Pride Puerto Rico (HPPR), which focused on LBGTQ issues and concerns on the island. Aside from organizing the first pride parade in Puerto Rico in 1990, Hayworth helped organize another pride parade in the capital city every June in collaboration with the Coalición de Orgullo Arco Iris (Rainbow Pride Coalition) (COA) in 2003.

During her time on the island, Hayworth became more involved with the Puerto Rican government. Hayworth was an independent candidate for mayor of San Juan, where she advocated for AIDS awareness in Puerto Rico. In 2011, she ran for Senator on behalf of the New Progressive Party.

In 2013, Evangelical pastor Jorge Raschke revealed to Puerto Rican media that Hayworth had been living in an abandoned and condemned building and was homeless. This led to Carmen Yulín Cruz Soto, the mayor of San Juan at the time, to offer Hayworth help. She was taken to Hogar Perla de Gran Precio (Home Pearl of Great Price), an organization focused on providing homes for people in Puerto Rico.

== Death ==
Hayworth died in Puerto Rico on February 8, 2021.
